= Brian Wilson =

American musician (1942–2025)

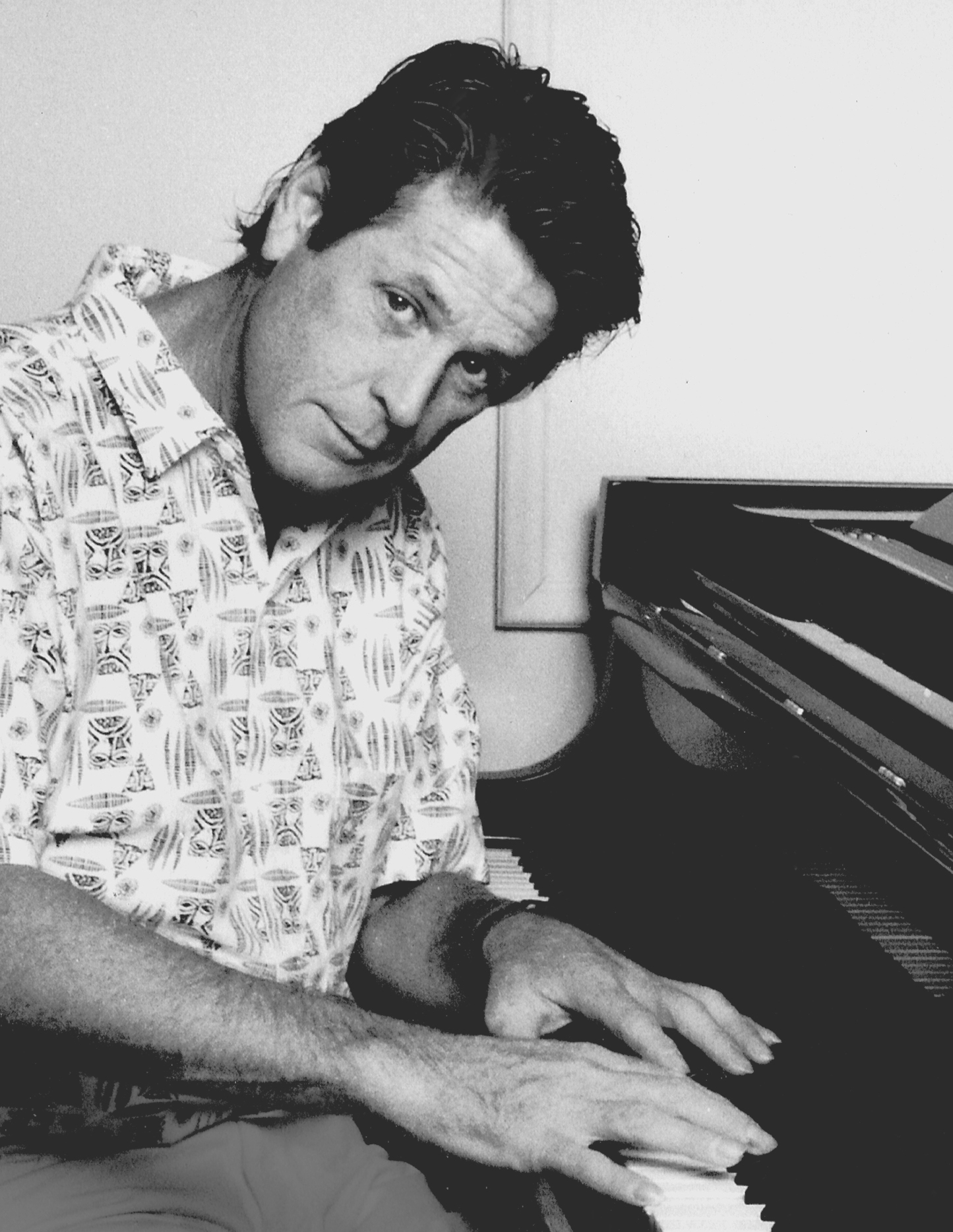
- Wilson in 1990
- Born: Brian Douglas Wilson; June 20, 1942; Inglewood, California, U.S.
- Died: June 11, 2025 (aged 82); Beverly Hills, California, U.S.
- Resting place: Westwood Memorial Park
- Occupations: Musician; singer; songwriter; record producer
- Years active: 1961–2024
- Spouses: Marilyn Rovell (m. 1964; div. 1979); Melinda Ledbetter (m. 1995; died 2024)
- Children: Carnie Wilson; Wendy Wilson; 5 adopted
- Father: Murry Wilson
- Relatives: Dennis Wilson (brother); Carl Wilson (brother); Mike Love (cousin); Stan Love (cousin); Kevin Love (first cousin once removed)
- Musical career
- Origin: Hawthorne, California, U.S.
- Genres: Rock; pop
- Instruments: Vocals; keyboards; bass
- Works: Discography; songs
- Labels: Capitol; Brother; Reprise; Caribou; CBS; Sire; Giant; Nonesuch; Walt Disney
- Formerly of: The Beach Boys; Brian Wilson's band; California Music; Hale & the Hushabyes; Kenny & the Cadets; The Survivors
- Website: brianwilson.com

Brian Douglas Wilson (June 20, 1942 – June 11, 2025) was an American musician, singer, songwriter and record producer who co-founded the Beach Boys. Widely regarded as one of the most innovative and significant figures in the history of popular music, his work was distinguished for its high production values and complex harmonies, orchestrations, and vocal arrangements. He is considered the first rock producer to apply the studio as an instrument and one of the first music producer auteurs. His lyrics often were introspective or characterized as ingenuous; vocally, he was known for his versatile head voice and falsetto.

The oldest sibling of bandmates Carl and Dennis, Brian's formative influences included George Gershwin, the Four Freshmen, Phil Spector, and Burt Bacharach. In 1961, he began his professional career as a member of the Beach Boys, serving as their songwriter, producer, co-lead vocalist, bassist, keyboardist, and de facto leader. After signing with Capitol Records in 1962, he became the first pop musician credited for writing, arranging, producing, and performing his own material. He wrote or co-wrote over three dozen U.S. Top 40 hits, mostly for the Beach Boys and several for Jan and Dean, including the number-ones "Surf City" (1963), "I Get Around" (1964), "Help Me, Rhonda" (1965), and "Good Vibrations" (1966).

Wilson faced lifelong struggles with mental illness and withdrew from regular concert touring in late 1964 to concentrate on songwriting and recording. In 1966, he produced the band's album Pet Sounds and his first solo credited release, "Caroline, No", as well as their unfinished album Smile. Branded a genius, his productivity, mental health, and vocal range declined significantly amid periods of reclusion, overeating, and substance abuse. His first professional comeback yielded the almost solo effort The Beach Boys Love You (1977). In the 1980s, he formed a controversial creative and business partnership with his psychologist, Eugene Landy, and relaunched his solo career with the album Brian Wilson (1988). Wilson dissociated from Landy in 1991 and toured regularly with his own supporting band from 1999 to 2022. He completed a version of Smile in 2004, earning him his greatest acclaim as a solo artist.

Heralding popular music's recognition as an art form, Wilson's success helped initiate an era of unprecedented creative autonomy for label-signed acts. He contributed to the development of many music genres and movements, including the California sound, art pop/rock, psychedelia, chamber pop, progressive music, punk, and sunshine pop. After the 1980s, his influence was also significant in alternative and indie music. He received numerous industry awards, including two Grammy Awards and Kennedy Center Honors, and was inducted into the Rock and Roll Hall of Fame in 1988 and the Songwriters Hall of Fame in 2000. His life was dramatized in the 2014 biopic Love and Mercy. He died in 2025 of respiratory arrest.

== Early life and musical training ==
Brian Douglas Wilson was born on June 20, 1942, at Centinela Hospital Medical Center in Inglewood, California, the first child of Audree Neva (née Korthof) and Murry Wilson, a machinist who later pursued songwriting part-time. Wilson's two younger brothers, Dennis and Carl, were born in 1944 and 1946. Shortly after Dennis's birth, the family moved from Inglewood to 3701 West 119th Street in nearby Hawthorne, California. Wilson, along with his siblings, suffered psychological and sporadic physical maltreatment from their father. His 2016 memoir characterizes his father as "violent" and "cruel".

I got so into The Four Freshmen. I could identify with Bob Flanigan's high voice. He taught me how to sing high. I worked for a year on The Four Freshmen with my hi-fi set. I eventually learned every song they did.

— Brian Wilson, 1998

From an early age, Wilson exhibited an aptitude for learning by ear. His father remembered how, after hearing only a few verses of "When the Caissons Go Rolling Along", the infant Wilson was able to reproduce its melody. (Note: Some sources indicate the tune was the "Marine Corps Hymn".) Murry was a driving force in cultivating his children's musical talents. Brian's parents noticed his ability to identify musical notes around the age of 2. Wilson undertook six weeks of accordion lessons, and by ages seven and eight, he performed choir solos at church. (Note: According to his mother, "The [accordion instructor] said, 'I don't think he's reading. He hears it just once and plays the whole thing perfectly.'") His choir director declared him to have perfect pitch. Wilson owned an educational record titled The Instruments of the Orchestra and was a regular listener of KFWB, his favorite radio station at the time. Carl introduced him to R&B, and their uncle Charlie taught him boogie-woogie piano. Both brothers would frequently stay up listening to Johnny Otis's KFOX radio show, incorporating its R&B tracks into their musical lexicon. (Note: Carl remarked that by the age of 10, his brother "could play great boogie-woogie piano!")

One of Wilson's first forays into songwriting, penned when he was nine, was a reinterpretation of the lyrics to Stephen Foster's "Oh! Susannah". (Note: In his 1991 memoir, he recalls writing his first song for a fourth-grade school project concerning Paul Bunyan. In a 2005 interview, he said that he began composing original music at age twelve, in 1955.) When he was 12, his family acquired an upright piano, and he began teaching himself to play piano by spending hours mastering his favorite songs. He learned how to write manuscript music through a friend of his father. Wilson sang with peers at school functions, as well as with family and friends at home, and guided his two brothers in learning harmony parts, which they would rehearse together. He also played piano obsessively after school, deconstructing the harmonies of the Four Freshmen by listening to short segments of their songs on a phonograph, then working to recreate the blended sounds note by note on the keyboard.

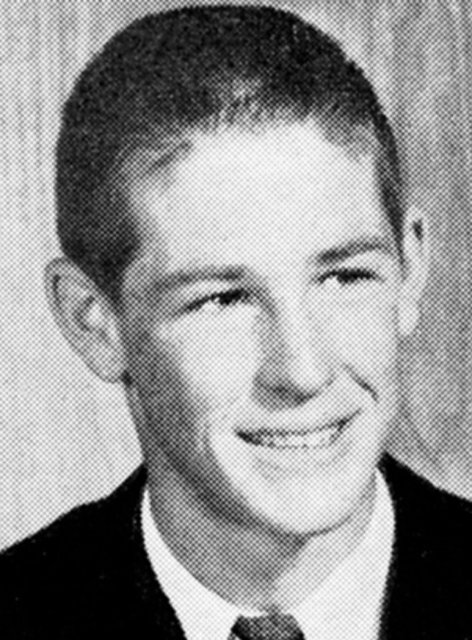
Wilson's senior yearbook photo, June 1960

In high school, Wilson played quarterback for Hawthorne High's football team, played American Legion Baseball,, and ran cross-country in his senior year. At 15, he briefly worked part-time sweeping at a jewelry store, his only paid employment before his success in music. (Note: His 2016 memoir says his "first real job" was at a lumberyard.) He also cleaned for his father's machining company, ABLE, on weekends. He auditioned to sing for the Original Sound Record Company's inaugural record release, but was deemed too young.

For his 16th birthday, Wilson received a portable two-track Wollensak tape recorder, allowing him to experiment with recording songs, group vocals, and rudimentary production techniques. He involved his friends around the piano and would most frequently harmonize with those from his senior class in these recordings. Fred Morgan, his high school music teacher, recalled his aptitude for learning Bach and Beethoven at 17. For his Senior Problems course in October 1959, he submitted an essay, "My Philosophy", in which he stated that his ambitions were to "make a name for myself [...] in music".

One of Wilson's earliest public performances was at a fall arts program at his high school. He enlisted his cousin and frequent singing partner Mike Love and, to entice Carl into the group, named the newly formed membership "Carl and the Passions". They performed songs by Dion and the Belmonts and the Four Freshmen, impressing classmate and musician, Al Jardine.

In September 1960, Wilson enrolled as a psychology major at El Camino Junior College in Los Angeles, also pursuing music. Disappointed by his teachers' disdain for pop music, he withdrew from college after about 18 months. By his account, he crafted his first entirely original melody, "Surfer Girl", in 1961, inspired by a Dion and the Belmonts rendition of "When You Wish Upon a Star". However, his close high school friends disputed his claim, recalling earlier original compositions.

== Career ==
=== 1961–1963: Formation of the Beach Boys and early production work ===
I wasn't aware those early songs defined California so well until much later in my career. I certainly didn't set out to do it. I wasn't into surfing at all. My brother Dennis gave me all the jargon I needed to write the songs. He was the surfer and I was the songwriter.

— Brian Wilson

The three Wilson brothers, Love, and Jardine debuted their first music group together, called "the Pendletones", in the autumn of 1961. At Dennis's suggestion, Brian and Love co-wrote the group's first song, "Surfin'". Murry became their manager. Produced by Hite and Dorinda Morgan on Candix Records, "Surfin'" became a hit in Los Angeles and reached 75 on the national Billboard sales charts while the group's name was changed by Candix Records to the Beach Boys. Their major live debut was at the Ritchie Valens Memorial Dance on New Year's Eve, 1961. Days earlier, Wilson had received an electric bass from his father and quickly learned to play, prompting Jardine to switch to rhythm guitar.

When Candix Records faced financial difficulties and sold the Beach Boys' master recordings to another label, Murry ended their contract. As "Surfin'" faded from the charts, Wilson collaborated with local musician Gary Usher to produce demo recordings for new tracks, including "409" and "Surfin' Safari". Capitol Records were persuaded to release the demos as a single, achieving a double-sided national hit.

Brian Wilson is the Beach Boys. He is the band. We're his fucking messengers. He is all of it. Period. We're nothing. He's everything.

— Dennis Wilson

In 1962, Wilson and the Beach Boys signed a seven-year contract with Capitol Records under producer Nick Venet. During sessions for their debut album, Surfin' Safari, Wilson negotiated with Capitol to record the band outside the label's basement studios, which he deemed ill-suited for his group. (Note: Their rooms had been designed for large orchestras and ensembles of the 1950s, not small rock groups.) At Wilson's insistence, Capitol permitted the Beach Boys to fund their own external sessions while retaining all rights to the recordings. He also secured production control over the album, though he was not credited for this role in the liner notes.

Wilson had sought to emulate producer Phil Spector's career path, later reflecting, "I've always felt I was a behind-the-scenes man, rather than an entertainer." Collaborating with songwriter Gary Usher, he composed numerous songs patterned after the Teddy Bears' style and produced records for local talent, though without commercial breakthrough. His first uncredited production outside the Beach Boys was Rachel and the Revolvers' "The Revo-Lution", co-written with Usher and released by Dot Records in September. Interference from Wilson's father eventually led to the dissolution of his partnership with Usher. By mid-1962, Wilson was writing with disc jockey Roger Christian, whom he met via Murry or Usher, and with guitarist Bob Norberg, who later became his roommate. In October 1962, Safari Records—a short-lived label founded by Murry—released the single "The Surfer Moon" by Bob & Sheri, the first record to credit Brian as producer. The label's only other release was Bob & Sheri's "Humpty Dumpty", with both songs written by Wilson.

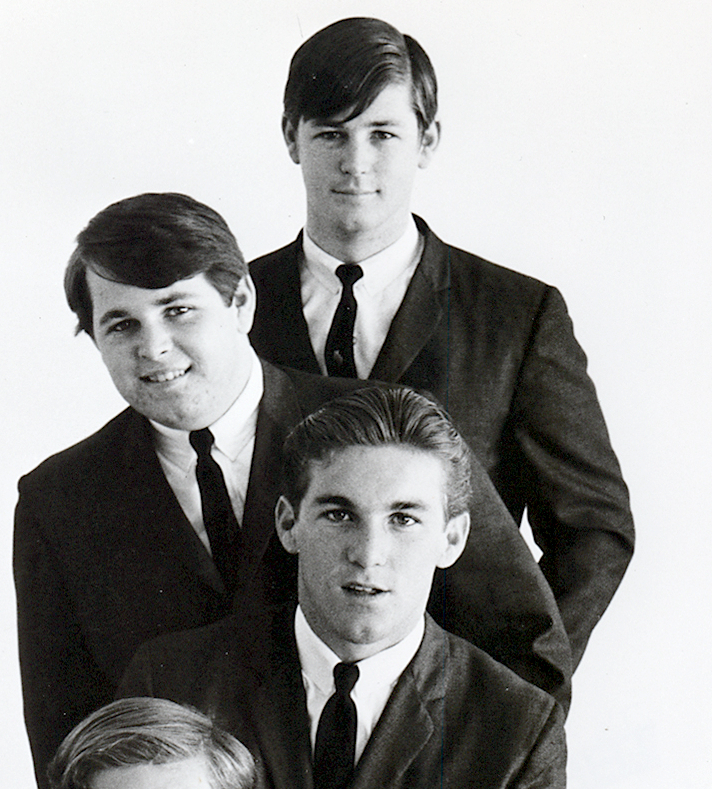
Wilson (top) with his brothers Carl (middle) and Dennis (bottom) at a Beach Boys photoshoot, early 1963

From January to March 1963, Wilson produced the Beach Boys' second album, Surfin' U.S.A., limiting his public appearances with the group to television gigs and local shows to prioritize studio work. David Marks substituted for him on vocals during other performances. In March, Capitol released "Surfin' U.S.A.", the Beach Boys' first top-ten single. The accompanying album peaked at number two on the Billboard charts by July, cementing the Beach Boys as a major commercial act. Against Venet's wishes, Wilson collaborated with artists outside Capitol, including the Liberty Records duo Jan and Dean. Wilson co-wrote "Surf City" with Jan Berry, which topped U.S. charts in July 1963, his first composition to do so. The song's success revitalized Jan and Dean's faltering career. Capitol and Wilson's father disapproved of the collaboration; Murry demanded his son cease working with the duo, though they continued to appear on each other's recordings.

Around this time, Wilson began producing the Rovell Sisters, a girl group consisting of sisters Marilyn Rovell and Diane Rovell and their cousin Ginger Blake, whom he met at a Beach Boys concert the previous August. Wilson pitched the group to Capitol as "the Honeys", a female counterpart to the Beach Boys. The company released several Honeys records as singles, though they sold poorly. He grew close to the Rovell family and resided primarily at their home through 1963 and 1964. The group's fourth single "He's a Doll", released in April 1964, exemplified his attempts to become an entrepreneurial producer like Spector.

Wilson was first officially credited as the Beach Boys' producer on their album Surfer Girl, recorded in June and July 1963 and released that September. This LP reached number seven on the national charts, with similarly successful singles. He also produced the car-themed album Little Deuce Coupe, released just three weeks after Surfer Girl. Still resistant to touring, Jardine was his live substitute. By late 1963, Marks' departure necessitated Wilson's return to the touring lineup. By the end of the year, Wilson had written, arranged, or produced 42 songs for other acts. (Note: This includes records by the Honeys, Jan and Dean, the Survivors, Sharon Marie, the Timers, the Castells ("I Do"), Bob Norberg, Vickie Kocher, Gary Usher, Christian, Paul Petersen ("She Rides with Me"), and Larry Denton ("Endless Sleep"). He also founded Brian Wilson Productions, a record production company with offices on Sunset Boulevard, and Ocean Music, a publishing entity for his work with artists outside the Beach Boys.)

=== 1964–1965: International success and withdrawal from touring ===
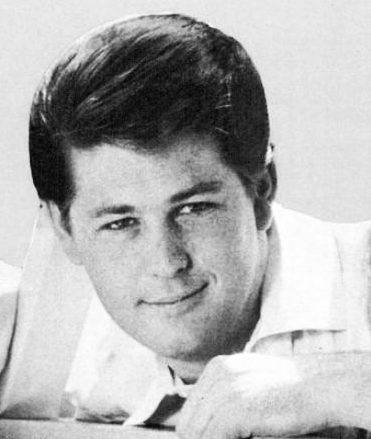
Wilson at a Beach Boys photoshoot, 1964

Throughout 1964, Wilson toured internationally with the Beach Boys while writing and producing their albums Shut Down Volume 2 (March), All Summer Long (June), and The Beach Boys' Christmas Album (November). Following a particularly stressful Australasian tour in early 1964, the group dismissed Murry as their manager. Murry maintained occasional contact with Wilson, offering unsolicited advice on the group's business decisions. (Note: Brian also continued to solicit his father's opinions on musical matters.)

In February, Beatlemania swept the U.S., a development that deeply concerned Wilson, who felt the Beach Boys' supremacy had been threatened by the British Invasion. Reflecting in 1966, he said, "The Beatles invasion shook me up a lot. [...] So we stepped on the gas a little bit." The Beach Boys' May 1964 single "I Get Around", their first U.S. number-one hit, is identified by scholar James Perone as representing both a successful response to the British Invasion and the beginning of an unofficial rivalry between Wilson and the Beatles, principally Paul McCartney. The B-side, "Don't Worry Baby", was cited by Wilson in a 1970 interview as "Probably the best record we've done".

By late 1964, Wilson had faced mounting psychological strain from career pressures. He began distancing himself from the Beach Boys' surf-themed material, which had ceased following the All Summer Long track "Don't Back Down". During the group's first major European tour, a reporter asked how he had felt about originating the surfing sound, to which he responded by saying he had aimed to "produce a sound that teens dig, and that can be applied to any theme." Exhausted by his self-described "Mr Everything" role, he later expressed feeling mentally drained and unable to rest. Adding to his concerns were the group's "business operations" and the quality of their records, which he believed suffered from this arrangement.

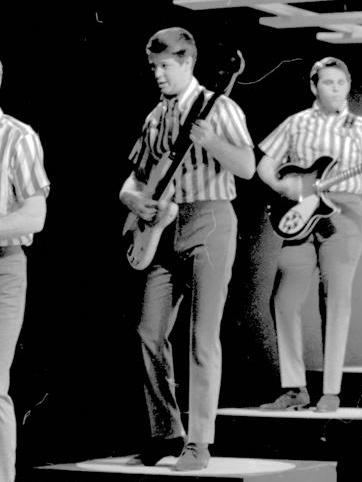
Wilson performing "Dance, Dance, Dance" with the Beach Boys at NBC TV studio, December 18, 1964

On December 18, 1964, Wilson was to accompany his bandmates for a two-week U.S. tour, but during a flight from Los Angeles to Houston, he experienced a breakdown, sobbing uncontrollably due to stress over his recent marriage to Marilyn Rovell. Jardine recalled, "None of us had ever witnessed something like that." Wilson played the show in Houston later that day, but was replaced by session musician Glen Campbell for the rest of the tour. (Note: This was the first time Wilson had skipped concert dates with the Beach Boys since 1963. Although he continued to make sporadic appearances at gigs, the Houston show marked his last as a regular member of the touring group until 1976.) Wilson, speaking in 1966, described it as "the first of a series of three breakdowns". When the group resumed recording their next album in January 1965, Wilson declared that he would be withdrawing from future tours. Wilson attributed his decision partly to a "fucked up" jealousy of Spector and the Beatles. (Note: Songwriters Barry Mann and Cynthia Weil recalled that Wilson had confided in them about considering retirement from the music industry, changing his mind after hearing Spector's latest hit record, "You've Lost That Lovin' Feelin'". In an interview from August 1966, Wilson states, "I never wanted to quit the music business. I just wanted to get off the road, which I did." Photographer Ed Roach said that Brian had felt overshadowed by the audience's enthusiastic response to his brother Dennis during live performances.)

Wilson rejoined the live group for one-off occasions throughout 1965. Campbell substituted for him at some shows until February 1965, after which Wilson produced Campbell's solo single, "Guess I'm Dumb", as a gesture of appreciation. Columbia Records staff producer Bruce Johnston was subsequently hired as Wilson's permanent touring replacement.

=== 1965–1966: Artistic growth and Pet Sounds ===
With his bandmates frequently touring, Wilson grew socially distant from the Beach Boys. By late 1964, he had relocated to an apartment at 7235 Hollywood Boulevard, where he had begun cultivating a new social circle through music industry connections. Biographer Steven Gaines writes that this period marked Wilson's first independence from familial oversight, allowing friendships without "parental interference". Wilson befriended talent agent Loren Schwartz, whom he met at a Hollywood studio and was introduced to literature on philosophy and world religions, sparking his interest in mystical topics. His first song composed under the influence of marijuana was "Please Let Me Wonder" (1965).

[In 1965] I had what I consider to be a very religious experience. I took LSD, a full dose of LSD, and later, another time, I took a smaller dose. And I learned a lot of things, like patience, understanding. I can't teach you, or tell you what I learned from taking it.

— Brian Wilson, 1966

Throughout 1965, Wilson's musical ambitions progressed significantly with the albums The Beach Boys Today! (March) and Summer Days (And Summer Nights!!) (June). Weeks after relocating to an apartment on West Hollywood's Gardner Street with his wife early in the year, Wilson took LSD for the first time under Schwartz's supervision. Wilson later said of the experience, "it just tore my head off. [...] You just come to grips with what you are, what you can do [and] can't do, and learn to face it." During the experience, he composed portions of the Beach Boys' single "California Girls". He later described the session for the song's backing track, held on April 6, as his "favorite", and the opening orchestral section as "the greatest piece of music that I've ever written". However, he attributed persistent paranoia later that year to his LSD use.

After unsuccessful efforts to distance Wilson from Schwartz, Marilyn temporarily separated from him. She later reflected on the strain caused by his drug-associated social circle, stating, "He was not the same Brian... These people were very hurtful, and I tried to get that through to Brian." The couple soon reconciled, and, in late 1965, moved into a newly purchased home at 1448 Laurel Way in Beverly Hills. (Note: Sources differ on the move-in date: White cites December, while Badman specifies October.) Wilson recalled that after relocating to his Beverly Hills home, he experienced an unexpected surge of creativity, working for hours to develop new musical ideas. He acknowledged heavy drug use, stating, "I was taking [...] a lot of pills, and it fouled me up for a while. It got me really introspective". Over five months, he planned an album that would elevate his music to "a spiritual level".

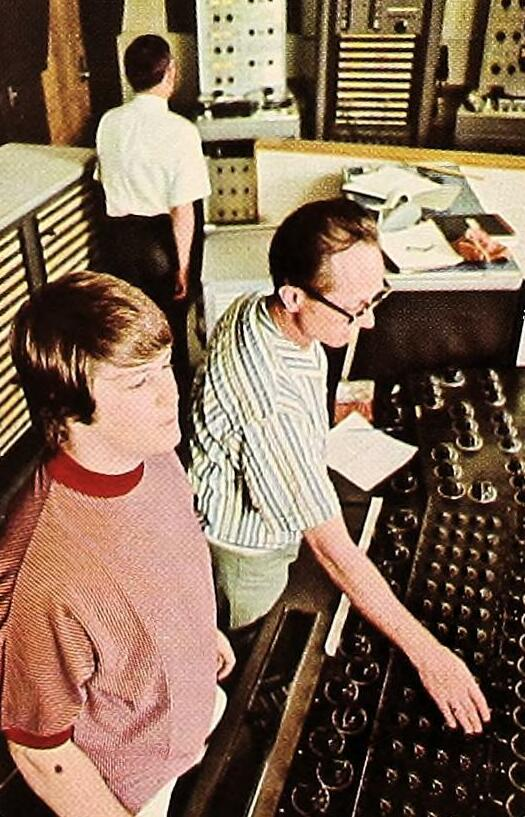
Wilson with engineer Bill Brittan recording Pet Sounds, early 1966

In December 1965, Wilson enlisted jingle writer Tony Asher as his lyricist for the Beach Boys' next album, Pet Sounds (May 1966). He produced most of the album between January and April 1966 across multiple Hollywood studios, mainly employing his bandmates for singing vocal parts and session musicians for the backing tracks. Reflecting on the album, Wilson highlighted the instrumental "Let's Go Away for Awhile" as his "most satisfying piece of music" at the time and "I Just Wasn't Made for These Times" as a partially autobiographical song "about a guy who was crying because he thought he was too advanced". In a 1995 interview, he called "Caroline, No" "probably the best [song] I've ever written".

The thing that I remember the most is that when Pet Sounds wasn't as quickly a hit or as huge or an immediate success, it really destroyed Brian. He just lost a lot of faith in people and music.

— Wilson's first wife Marilyn

The album's lead single, "Caroline, No", released in March 1966, became Wilson's first solo credit, sparking speculation about his potential departure from the Beach Boys. Wilson later said, "I explained to [the group], 'It's OK. It is only a temporary rift [...] I wanted to step out a little bit.'" The single peaked at number 32, while Pet Sounds reached number 10. Wilson was "mortified" that his artistic growth had failed to translate into a number-one album. Marilyn stated, "When it wasn't received by the public the way he thought it would be received, it made him hold back. ... but he didn't stop. He couldn't stop. He needed to create more."

=== 1966–1968: "Good Vibrations", Smile, and home studio transition ===
Wilson met Derek Taylor, the Beatles' former press officer, who became the Beach Boys' publicist in 1966. At Wilson's request, Taylor launched a media campaign to elevate his public image, promoting him as a "genius". Taylor's reputation and outreach bolstered the critical success of Pet Sounds in the UK. However, Wilson later expressed resentment toward the "genius" label, which he felt heightened unrealistic expectations for his work. Bandmates including Mike Love and Carl Wilson also grew frustrated as media coverage increasingly centered on Wilson and overshadowed the group's collaborative efforts.

Through late 1966, Wilson worked extensively on the Beach Boys' single "Good Vibrations", which topped the U.S. charts in December, and began collaborating with session musician Van Dyke Parks on Smile, the planned follow-up to Pet Sounds. Wilson touted Smile as a "teenage symphony to God" and his expanding circle increasingly influenced his business and creative affairs. Smile was never finished, due in large part to Wilson's worsening mental condition and exhaustion. In April 1967, Wilson and his wife relocated to a newly purchased mansion on 10452 Bellagio Road in Bel Air. (Note: Marilyn cited Wilson's desire for a larger home, while Badman writes that the move aimed to distance them from his entourage of "hanger-ons". Marilyn later installed security measures, including a brick wall and electronic gate.) There, Wilson began constructing a personal home studio. By this time, most of his recent associates had departed or been excluded from his life.

When I was younger, I was a real competitor. Then as I got older, I said, "Is it worth the bullshit? To compete like that?" And I said, "Nah." For a while there, I just said, "Hey, I'm going to coast. I'm going to make real nice music. Nothing competitive."

— Brian Wilson, 1994

In July 1967, the Beach Boys released "Heroes and Villains" as a single; its mixed critical and commercial reception further strained Wilson's morale, with biographers citing it as a factor in his professional and psychological decline. Wilson explained in a 1968 interview, "We pulled out [...] because I was about ready to die. I was trying so hard. So, all of a sudden I decided not to try any more." He later acknowledged that upholding his industry reputation "was a really big thing for me" and that he had grown weary of demands to produce "great orchestral stuff all the time".

Beginning with Smiley Smile (September 1967), the band shifted recording operations to Wilson's studio, where they worked intermittently until 1972. The album marked the first time production was credited to the group collectively instead of Wilson alone. Producer Terry Melcher attributed this change to Wilson's reluctance to risk individual scrutiny, saying he no longer wanted to "put his stamp on records". In August 1967, Wilson briefly rejoined the band for two live performances in Honolulu, recorded for an unfinished live album titled Lei'd in Hawaii.

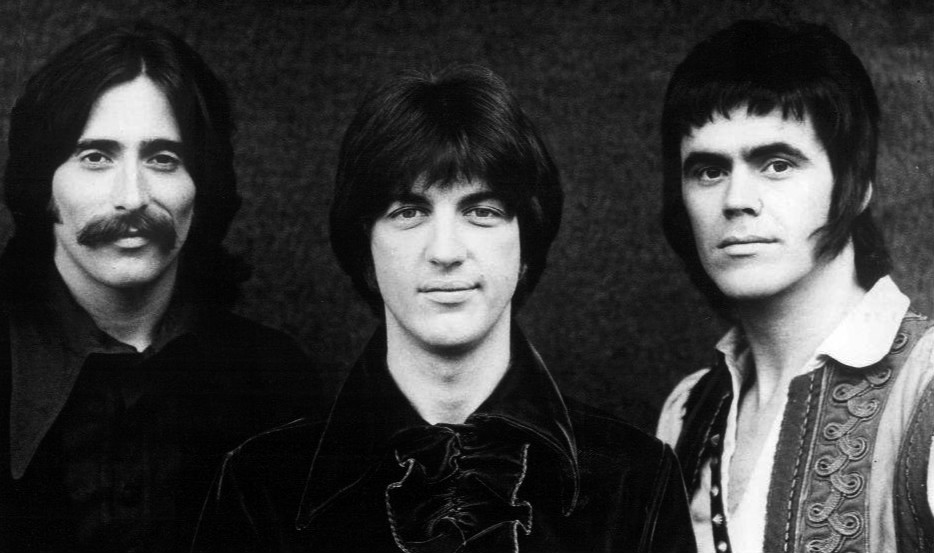
Wilson produced recordings for the band Redwood, later known as Three Dog Night (pictured 1969).

During sessions for Wild Honey (December 1967), Wilson encouraged his brother Carl to contribute more to the record-making process. He also began producing tracks for Danny Hutton's group Redwood, recording three songs including "Time to Get Alone" and "Darlin'", but the project was halted by his bandmates. The band's June 1968 album Friends was recorded during a period of emotional recovery for Wilson. While the album featured increased contributions from other members, Wilson remained central, even on tracks he did not write. He later described Friends as his second "solo album" (after Pet Sounds) and his favorite Beach Boys album.

=== 1968–1975: Reduced activity and professional decline ===
For the remainder of 1968, Wilson's songwriting output declined substantially, as did his emotional state, leading him to self-medicate with overconsumption of food, alcohol, and drugs. As the Beach Boys faced impending financial collapse, he began to supplement his regular amphetamines and marijuana with cocaine, to which Hutton had introduced him. Hutton later stated that Wilson expressed suicidal ideation during this period, describing it as the onset of Wilson's "real decline". In mid-1968, he was admitted to a psychiatric hospital, possibly voluntarily. His hospitalization was kept private, and his bandmates proceeded with recording sessions for 20/20 (February 1969). Journalist Nik Cohn wrote in 1968 that Brian had become the subject of rumors describing him as "increasingly withdrawn", "brooding", and "hermitic" [sic], with occasional sightings of him "in the back of some limousine, cruising around Hollywood, bleary and unshaven, huddled way tight into himself".

Brian went through a period where he would write songs and play them for a few people in his living room, and that's the last you'd hear of them. He would disappear back up to his bedroom and the song with him.

— Bruce Johnston

Once discharged later in the year, Wilson rarely finished any tracks for the band, leaving much of his subsequent output for Carl to complete. He typically stayed secluded upstairs while the group recorded below, joining sessions only to suggest revisions to music he had overheard. He occasionally emerged from his bedroom to preview new songs for the group. Melcher likened these appearances to Aesop delivering a new fable. Journalist Brian Chidester later coined the term "Bedroom Tapes" to refer to Wilson's unreleased output between 1968 and 1975, most of which remains unheard publicly. According to Mike Love, Wilson had "lost interest in the mechanical aspect" of recording, deferring technical work to Carl. (Note: Band engineer Stephen Desper said that Brian remained "indirectly involved" with the group's productions through Carl and that Brian's reduced contributions stemmed from "limited hours in the day", as well as his aversion to confrontation: "Brian [...] doesn't like to hurt anyone's feelings, so if someone's working on something else, he wasn't going to jump in there and say, 'Look, this is my production and my house, so get outta here!'" Conversely, Dennis stated that Brian had "no involvement at all" with the band beginning with the 20/20 sessions, forcing them to salvage and assemble fragments of his earlier work. Dennis also rejected claims that the Beach Boys had excluded Brian. Marilyn recalled that her husband withdrew because of perceived resentment from the group: "It was like, 'OK, you assholes, you think you can do as good as me or whatever—go ahead—you do it. You think it's so easy? You do it.'")

Early in 1969, the Beach Boys commenced recording Sunflower (August 1970). Wilson contributed numerous songs, though most were excluded from the final track selection. He co-wrote and produced the single "Break Away" with his father in early 1969, after which he largely withdrew from studio work until August. The group faced difficulties securing a new record deal, attributed by Gaines to Wilson's diminished standing in the industry. In May 1969, Wilson disclosed the band's near-bankruptcy to reporters, which derailed negotiations with Deutsche Grammophon and nearly jeopardized their upcoming European tour. That July, he opened a short-lived health food store, the Radiant Radish, with cousin Steve Korthof and associate Arny Geller.

In August, the Beach Boys' publishing company, Sea of Tunes, sold their song catalog to Irving Almo Music for $700,000 ($6.15 million in 2025). Wilson signed the consent form under pressure from his father. Marilyn later stated that the sale emotionally devastated him: "It killed him. Killed him. I don't think he talked for days. [...] Brian took it as Murry not believing in him anymore." During this period, Wilson reportedly engaged in self-destructive behavior, including an attempt to drive off a cliff and a demand to be buried in a backyard grave he had dug. (Note: David Leaf, writing in his 1978 biography of the band, said that Wilson's family and friends had dismissed these incidents as jokes.) He channeled his despondence into writing "'Til I Die", later calling the song a summation of "everything I had to say at the time".

Later in 1969, Wilson produced poet Stephen Kalinich's spoken-word album A World of Peace Must Come. That November, the Beach Boys signed to Reprise Records, a subsidiary of Warner Bros., with contractual terms requiring Wilson's active participation in their albums. (Note: Though Wilson never personally signed the agreement, the band's corporate structure allowed it to pass with three of five member votes.) In March 1970, Wilson briefly substituted for Mike Love on tour. In April, he attempted to produce a country and western album for co-manager Fred Vail, later known as Cows in the Pasture.

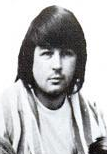
Wilson in a 1971 Billboard advertisement for Surf's Up

Wilson's disappointment over the poor commercial reception of Sunflower led him to reduce his contributions to subsequent Beach Boys recordings. Bruce Johnston described his involvement in the Surf's Up sessions (August 1971) as that of "a visitor". In November 1970, Wilson performed with the band at the Whisky a Go Go for one-and-a-half dates. Intense discomfort forced him to leave mid-performance during the second show. (Note: Wilson recalled, "On the second night, I started [...] feeling dizzy and I told the guys I had to stop. It felt like I was killing myself.") Following this experience, he told Melody Maker that although he was "quite happy living at home", he felt less creative and less engaged with the band. He described himself as "a kind of drop-out". In September 1971, Wilson told a reporter he had recently returned to arranging rather than writing. In December, at a Long Beach concert, manager Jack Rieley persuaded Wilson to perform with the Beach Boys, though his appearance lasted only minutes.

From late 1971 to early 1972, Wilson and musician David Sandler collaborated on Spring, the first album by Marilyn Wilson and Diane Rovell's new group, American Spring. As with much of his work in this period, the extent of his contributions varied, but it was his most involved production effort since Friends in 1968. During the recording of Carl and the Passions (April 1972), Wilson rarely left his bedroom and his unavailability was such that his image had to be superimposed into the group portrait included in the record sleeve. (Note: Bruce Johnston left the band during these sessions partly due to his unhappiness with Wilson's creative withdrawal.)

During the summer of 1972, Wilson joined his bandmates when they temporarily relocated to Holland after persistent persuasion. Residing in a Dutch house known as "Flowers" and repeatedly listening to Randy Newman's album Sail Away, he was inspired to write a fairy tale, Mount Vernon and Fairway, drawing on memories of listening to the radio at Mike Love's family home in his youth. The group declined to include the fairy tale on their next album, Holland (January 1973), and instead released it as a bonus EP packaged with the album. That April, Wilson briefly joined his bandmates onstage during an encore at the Hollywood Palladium.

==== Recluse period ====
I was taking some drugs and I experimented myself right out of action. [...] I'd sometimes go and record. But basically I just stayed in my bedroom. I was under the sheets and I watched television.

— Brian Wilson

After his father's death in June 1973, Wilson secluded himself in the chauffeur's quarters of his home, where he spent his time sleeping, abusing drugs and alcohol, overeating, and exhibiting self-destructive behavior. He rarely ventured outside wearing anything but pajamas and later said that his father's death "had a lot to do with my retreating". Wilson's family were eventually forced to take control of his financial affairs due to his irresponsible drug expenditures. (Note: Carl explained, "There was a thing where Brian kept on giving people money to 'score'. Not for himself but for themselves. It's like he was giving a guy every week a few hundred bucks, and a very well-known guy at that.") This led Wilson to occasionally wander the city, begging for rides, drugs, and alcohol.

According to Wilson, from 1974 to 1975, his output was confined to minimal, fragmentary recordings, due to a diminished capacity for sustained concentration. He elaborated that he had been preoccupied with snorting cocaine, reading magazines such as Playboy and Penthouse, and "hanging out with Danny Hutton", whose Laurel Canyon house had become the center of Wilson's social life. Although increasingly reclusive during the day, Wilson spent many nights at Hutton's house fraternizing with colleagues such as Alice Cooper and Iggy Pop. Other visitors of Hutton's home included Harry Nilsson, John Lennon, Ringo Starr, and Keith Moon. (Note: Wilson stated in a 2001 interview that he had never met Lennon. However, Cooper told another story in which he had witnessed Wilson at a party, with Lennon, repeatedly asking fellow attendees to introduce him to the Beatle, one after another.) On several occasions, Marilyn Wilson sent her friends to climb Hutton's fence and retrieve her husband. In 1974, Wilson interrupted a set by jazz musician Larry Coryell at The Troubadour by leaping on stage and singing "Be-Bop-a-Lula" while wearing slippers and a bathrobe.

Many reported anecdotes involving Wilson in the early 1970s, though frequently of questionable veracity, attained a legendary status. Recalling Wilson's wellbeing at the time, John Sebastian said, "It wasn't all grimness." Jeff Foskett, then a Beach Boys fan who had visited Wilson's home unannounced, similarly commented that Wilson had responded cordially to the visit and had belied the popular myths surrounding him. Wilson also participated in some recording sessions for Nilsson's "Salmon Falls" and Keith Moon's solo album, Two Sides of the Moon.

The Beach Boys' greatest hits compilation Endless Summer was a surprise success, becoming the band's second number-one U.S. album in October 1974. To take advantage of their sudden resurgence in popularity, Wilson agreed to join his bandmates in Colorado for the recording of a new album at James William Guercio's Caribou Ranch studio. The group completed a few tracks, including "Child of Winter (Christmas Song)", but ultimately abandoned the project. Released as a single at the end of December 1974, "Child of Winter" was their first record that displayed the credit "Produced by Brian Wilson" since 1966.

Early in 1975, while still under contract with Warner Bros., Wilson signed a short-lived sideline production deal with Bruce Johnston and Terry Melcher's Equinox Records. Together, they founded the loose-knit supergroup known as California Music, which also involved Gary Usher, Curt Boettcher, and other Los Angeles musicians. Along with his guest appearances on Johnny Rivers's rendition of "Help Me, Rhonda" and Jackie DeShannon's "Boat to Sail", Wilson's production of California Music's single "Why Do Fools Fall in Love" represents his only "serious" work throughout this period.

=== 1975–1982: First Landy intervention, Love You, and regression ===
Wilson's consumption of food, cigarettes, alcohol, and other drugs, including heroin, increased during this period, and his weight reached 240 pounds (110 kg). In 1975, to address his declining health, band manager Stephen Love appointed his brother Stan, a professional basketball player, as Wilson's bodyguard, trainer, and caretaker. A family intervention involving the band's lawyers and accountants was arranged to remind Wilson of his contractual obligation to write and produce for the Beach Boys. According to Stan, Wilson's growing resentment had led him to frequently announce his withdrawal from the Beach Boys, but his bandmates persisted. Although Stan improved Wilson's health over several months, he soon returned to his NBA commitments. Wilson entered psychologist Eugene Landy's intensive 24-hour therapy program in October.

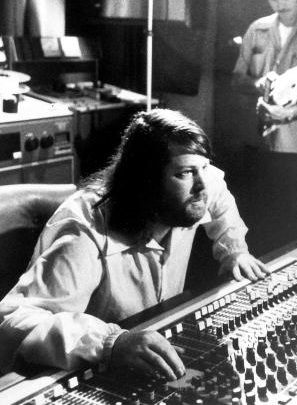
Wilson producing 15 Big Ones in early 1976

Under Landy's care, Wilson stabilized and became more socially engaged, renewing his productivity. In 1976, the slogan "Brian's Back!" was widely used to promote the Beach Boys' concert tours and the July release of 15 Big Ones, the first album since Pet Sounds to list Wilson as the sole producer. Recording sessions were tense, as his bandmates opposed his proposal for a covers album and questioned his readiness to lead studio proceedings. The album ultimately featured a mix of covers and original material.

Beginning on July 2, 1976, Wilson resumed regular performances with the band for the first time since 1964, singing and alternating between bass guitar and piano. (Note: Some reports erroneously state that this was his first appearance since 1964.) In August, he toured outside California for the first time since 1970. NBC premiered a Lorne Michaels–produced television special, titled The Beach Boys, featuring recent concert footage, interviews, and a comedy sketch with Wilson alongside NBC's Saturday Night cast members Dan Aykroyd and John Belushi. (Note: Other television appearances included a September guest-presenter role on Don Kirshner's Annual Rock Music Awards, where he was nominated for the Hall of Fame category but lost to the Beatles, and a November feature on The Mike Douglas Show and NBC's Saturday Night, marking his first solo TV appearances since the Inside Pop special in 1966.) Despite the promotional success of "Brian's Back!", the campaign was controversial. Wilson's remarks in interviews implied he had not fully recovered from his addictions; on one occasion, he remarked that he "felt like a prisoner". A concert reviewer noted that he "seemed uncomfortable on stage" and contributed "nil".

That's when it all happened for me. That's where my heart lies. Love You, Jesus, that's the best album we ever made.

— Brian Wilson, 1998

From October 1976 to January 1977, Wilson produced a collection of recordings largely on his own while his bandmates pursued other creative and personal endeavors. Released in April 1977, The Beach Boys Love You was the band's first album to feature Wilson as the primary composer since Wild Honey in 1967. Originally titled Brian Loves You, the album showcased Wilson playing nearly every instrument. Band engineer Earle Mankey described it as Wilson's effort to create a "serious, autobiographical" work. In a 1998 interview, Wilson listed 15 Big Ones and Love You as his two favorite Beach Boys albums.

At the end of 1976, Wilson's family and management dismissed Landy after he raised his monthly fee to $20,000 ($113,000 in 2025). Shortly afterward, Wilson told a journalist he considered the treatment successful. Landy's role was immediately assumed by his cousins, Steve Korthof and Stan Love, and professional model Rocky Pamplin, a college friend of Stan. Under their supervision, Wilson maintained a healthy, drug-free lifestyle for several months. In early 1977, he produced Adult/Child, intended as the follow-up to Love You, but some bandmates voiced concerns about the work, leading to its non-release. In March, the Beach Boys signed with CBS Records, whose contract required Wilson to compose most of the material for all subsequent albums. According to Gaines, Wilson was distraught at the prospect. In reference to the sessions for M.I.U. Album (October 1978), Wilson described experiencing a "mental blank-out". He was credited as the album's "executive producer". (Note: Stan later stated that Wilson was "depressed" and reluctant at this time to write with Mike Love.) Around this time, Wilson attempted to produce an album for Pamplin that would have featured the Honeys as backing vocalists.

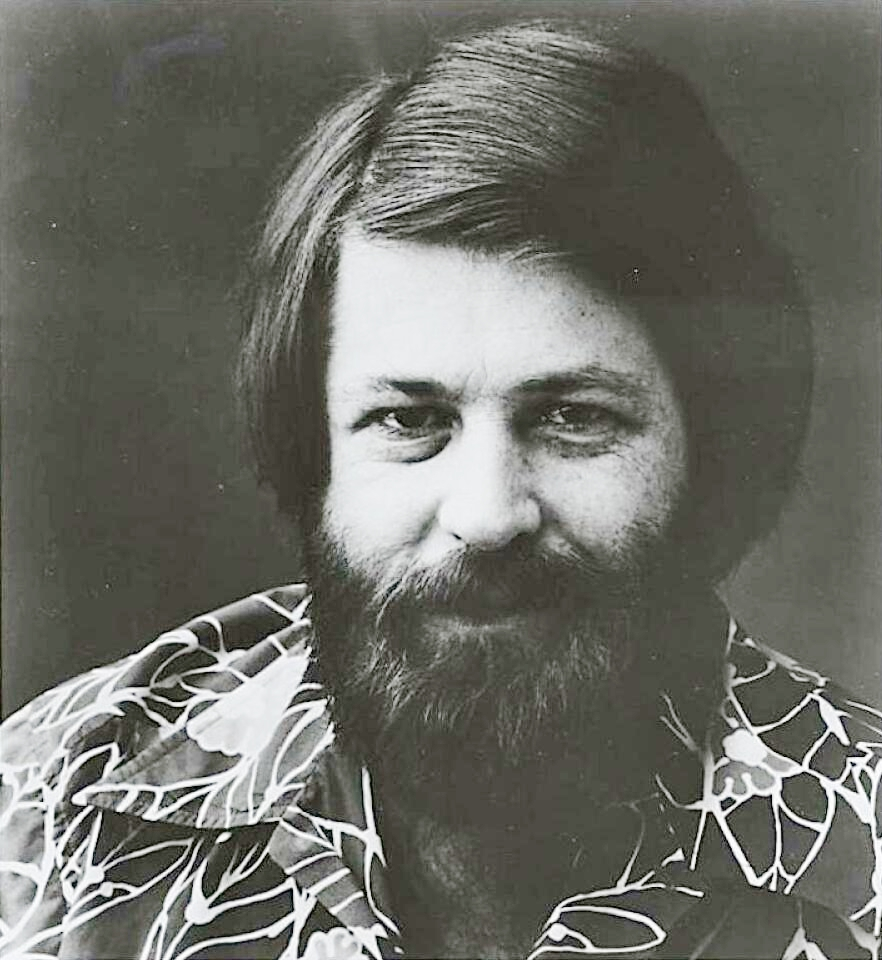
Wilson in a late-1970s publicity shot

After a disastrous Australian tour in 1978, Wilson regressed and began secretly acquiring cocaine and barbiturates. In mid-1978, following an overdose, he hitchhiked in West Hollywood, eventually arriving at a gay bar where he played piano for drinks. A bar patron then drove him to Mexico, after which he hitchhiked to San Diego. Days later, police found him in Balboa Park without shoes, money, or a wallet, and he was taken to Alvarado Hospital to detox from alcohol poisoning. Wilson rejoined his bandmates for the recording of L.A. (Light Album) (March 1979), but after producing demos and early recordings, he asked that Bruce Johnston take over the project.

Wilson left his mansion in Beverly Hills for a home on Sunset Boulevard, where his alcoholism worsened. After attacking his doctor, he was institutionalized at Brotzman Memorial Hospital—initially admitted in November 1978 for three months, discharged for one month, then readmitted. In January 1979, while hospitalized, his caregivers Stan Love and Rocky Pamplin were dismissed. Wilson was released in March. He rented a house in Santa Monica and was cared for by a psychiatric nursing team. Later, he purchased a home in Pacific Palisades. Although his bandmates urged him to produce their next album, Keepin' the Summer Alive (March 1980), he was unable or unwilling to do so.

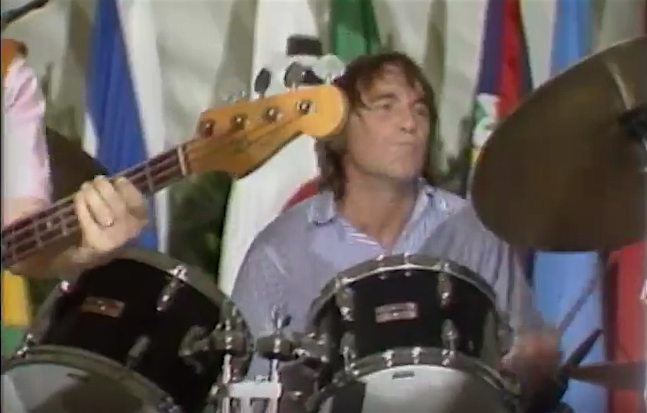
Dennis (pictured) collaborated with Brian on unreleased material in the early 1980s

Wilson continued his overeating and drug habits and, to motivate him in his musical endeavors, Dennis occasionally provided him with McDonald's hamburgers and cocaine. Jon Stebbins's biography of Dennis describes clandestine recording sessions between the brothers, which were hidden due to efforts by "certain members of the Beach Boys clan" to keep them apart. Discovering their collaboration often led to a halt in the proceedings. Bootlegged tapes of the brothers' collaborations—produced in 1980 and 1981 at the Venice Beach home studio of musicologist and film executive Garby Leon—later became known among fans as the "cocaine sessions" or "hamburger sessions". In early 1981, Pamplin and Stan Love were convicted of assaulting Dennis after learning he had been providing Wilson with drugs.

In early 1982, Wilson signed a trust document granting Carl control of his finances and voting power in the band's corporate structure, and he was involuntarily admitted for a three-day stay at St. John's Hospital in Santa Monica. By the end of the year, his weight exceeded 340 pounds (150 kg).

=== 1982–1991: Second Landy intervention and Brian Wilson ===
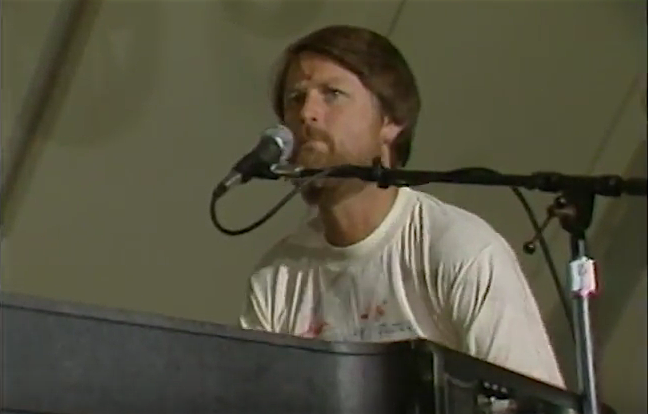
Wilson performing with the Beach Boys in 1983

In 1982, after Wilson overdosed on alcohol, cocaine, and other drugs, his family and management staged an elaborate ruse to persuade him to reenter Landy's program. On November 5, the group falsely informed Wilson that he was destitute and no longer a Beach Boy, insisting he reenlist Landy as his caretaker to continue receiving his touring income. Landy had agreed to resume treatment only if granted complete control over Wilson's affairs and promised rehabilitation within two years. Wilson acquiesced and was taken to Hawaii, where he was isolated from friends and family and placed on a strict diet and health regimen. Combined with counseling sessions that retaught him basic social etiquette, the treatment restored his physical health. By March 1983, he had returned to Los Angeles and was moved, under Landy's direction, to a Malibu home where he lived with several of Landy's aides and was cut off from many of his own friends and family.

Between 1983 and 1986, Landy charged approximately $430,000 annually ($1.39 million in 2025). When he requested additional funds, Carl Wilson was obliged to allocate a quarter of Brian's publishing royalties. Landy gradually assumed the role of Wilson's creative and financial partner, eventually representing him at Brother Records, Inc. corporate meetings. Landy was accused of creating a Svengali-like environment by controlling every aspect of Wilson's life—including his musical direction. Wilson countered these claims, stating, "People say that Dr. Landy runs my life, but the truth is, I'm in charge." He later claimed that in mid-1985 he attempted suicide by swimming as far out to sea as possible before one of Landy's aides retrieved him.

As Wilson's recovery consolidated, he participated in recording The Beach Boys (June 1985), a release touted as his "comeback". He then curtailed regular collaborations with the band to pursue a solo career under Landy's guidance. In 1986, he worked with former collaborator Gary Usher at Usher's studio, producing roughly a dozen songs—most unreleased—with one track, "Let's Go to Heaven in My Car", appearing on the Police Academy 3 (1986) soundtrack. This body of work became known as "the Wilson Project".

"Love and Mercy" from Brian Wilson (1988)
Wilson described "Love and Mercy" as a "personal message from me to people".

Wilson occasionally rejoined his bandmates on stage and performed his first ever solo gigs at several charity concerts around Los Angeles. In January 1987, he accepted a solo contract from Sire Records president Seymour Stein, who mandated co-production by multi-instrumentalist Andy Paley to keep Wilson focused. In return, Landy was allowed to serve as executive producer. Other producers, including Russ Titelman and Lenny Waronker, soon joined the project, and conflicts with Landy emerged. Released in July 1988, Brian Wilson received favorable reviews and moderate sales, peaking at number 52 in the U.S. The album featured "Rio Grande", an eight-minute Western suite reminiscent of songs from Smile. Its release was largely overshadowed by the controversy surrounding Landy and the success of the Beach Boys' "Kokomo", their first number-one hit since "Good Vibrations" and the first without Wilson's involvement.

In 1989, Wilson and Landy formed the company Brains and Genius. By then, Landy was no longer legally recognized as Wilson's therapist and had surrendered his California psychology license. Together, they worked on Wilson's second solo album, Sweet Insanity, with Landy co-writing nearly all the material. Sire rejected the album due to Landy's lyrics and the inclusion of Wilson's rap song "Smart Girls". In May 1989, Wilson recorded "Daddy's Little Girl" for the film She's Out of Control, and in June, he was among the featured guests on the charity single "The Spirit of the Forest".

By 1990, he was estranged from the Beach Boys, with his bandmates scheduling recording sessions without him and twice rejecting his offers to produce an album, according to Brother Records president Elliot Lott. After a conservatorship suit filed by his family in May 1991, Wilson and Landy's partnership was dissolved in December, followed by a restraining order.

=== 1992–2005: Career resurgence, first solo tours, and Brian Wilson Presents Smile ===
Throughout the 1990s, Wilson was embroiled in numerous lawsuits. In August 1989, he had filed a $100 million suit against Irving Music to reclaim song publishing rights sold by his father decades earlier. He did not regain the rights, but secured a $10 million ($21.1 million in 2025) out-of-court settlement in April 1992. The next month, Wilson was sued by Mike Love over long-neglected royalties and songwriting credits. In December 1994, a jury ruled in favor of Love, awarding him $5 million ($10.9 million in 2025) and a share of future royalties from Wilson. In September 1995, Wilson sued his former conservator, Jerome Billet, seeking $10 million for alleged failures in supervising the lawyers handling the Irving Music and Love lawsuits. According to his second wife Melinda Ledbetter, when they married in 1995, Wilson was entangled in nine separate lawsuits, many unresolved until the early 2000s.

Wilson's productivity had increased significantly after his disassociation from Landy. He and Andy Paley composed and recorded a substantial body of material intended for a proposed Beach Boys album throughout the early to mid-1990s. Concurrently, Wilson collaborated with musician Don Was on the documentary Brian Wilson: I Just Wasn't Made for These Times (1995), whose soundtrack, comprising rerecorded Beach Boys songs, was released in August as his second solo album. In 1993, Wilson had agreed to record an album of songs by Van Dyke Parks, which was credited to the duo and released as Orange Crate Art in October 1995. In the late 1990s, Wilson and Tony Asher rekindled their writing partnership, and one of their songs, "Everything I Need", appeared on The Wilsons (1997), a project by his daughters Carnie and Wendy that included select contributions from Wilson.

Although some recordings with the Beach Boys were completed, the Wilson–Paley project was eventually abandoned. Instead, Wilson co-produced the band's 1996 album Stars and Stripes Vol. 1 with Joe Thomas, owner of River North Records. At Ledbetter's behest, Wilson relocated to St. Charles, Illinois in 1997 to work on a solo project with Thomas. His third solo album, Imagination (June 1998), which he described as "really a Brian Wilson/Joe Thomas album", peaked at number 88 in the U.S. and received criticism for assimilating Wilson's music style into a homogenized radio pop sound. From March to July 1999, he embarked on his first solo tour, playing about a dozen dates in the U.S. and Japan with a new supporting band. In August, he filed suit against Thomas, seeking damages and a declaration that he could work on his next album without Thomas's involvement. (Note: Thomas counter-sued, alleging that Wilson's wife had "schemed against and manipulated" him and Wilson; the case was settled out of court.) Asked if he still considered himself a Beach Boy during this period, Wilson responded, "No. Maybe a little bit."

Early in 2000, Wilson released his first live album, Live at the Roxy Theatre. Later that year, he embarked on U.S. tour dates featuring the first full live performances of Pet Sounds, with Wilson backed by a 55-piece orchestra. Van Dyke Parks was commissioned to write an overture arrangement of Wilson's songs. In March 2001, Wilson attended a tribute show held in his honor at Radio City Music Hall in New York, where he performed "Heroes and Villains" publicly for the first time in decades. The Pet Sounds tour was followed by one in Europe in 2002; recordings from these concerts were issued as the live album Brian Wilson Presents Pet Sounds Live (June 2002). Over the next year, he continued sporadic recording sessions for his fourth solo album, Gettin' In over My Head. Released in June 2004, the record featured guest appearances from Parks, Paul McCartney, Eric Clapton, and Elton John. Some of the songs were leftovers from Wilson's collaborations with Paley and Thomas.

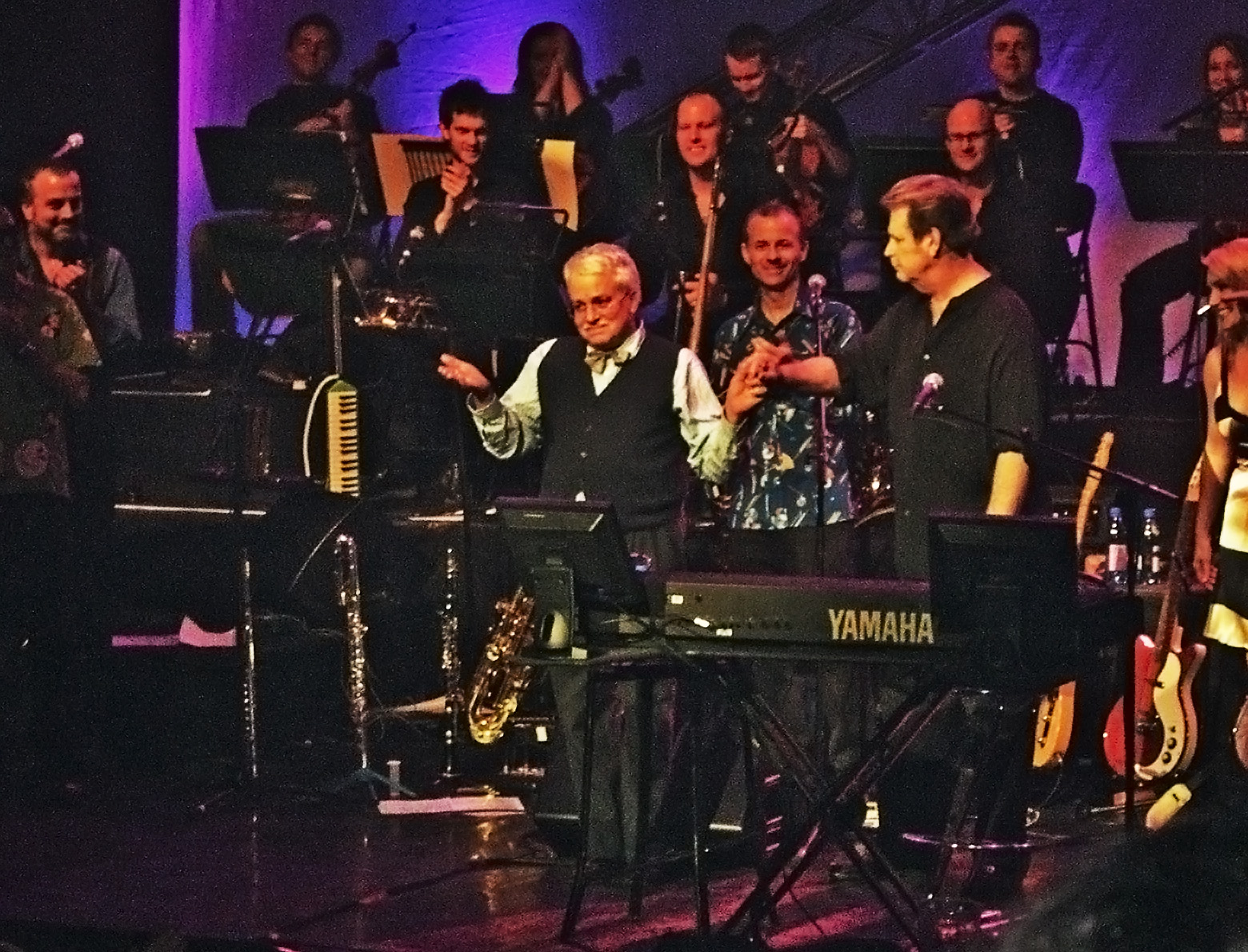
Brian Wilson Presents Smile at the Royal Festival Hall in London on February 21, 2004

To the surprise of his associates, Wilson agreed to follow the Pet Sounds tours with concert dates featuring songs from the unfinished Smile album. Band keyboardist Darian Sahanaja assisted with sequencing and Parks contributed additional lyrics. Brian Wilson Presents Smile (BWPS) premiered at the Royal Festival Hall in February 2004 and its positive reception led to a subsequent studio album adaptation. Released in September, BWPS debuted at number 13 on the Billboard 200, the highest chart position for any album by the Beach Boys or Wilson since 1976's 15 Big Ones and the highest ever debut for a Beach Boys-related album. It was later certified platinum.

In September, Wilson organized a charity drive for Hurricane Katrina victims, raising over $250,000. In November, Mike Love filed a lawsuit alleging that Wilson misappropriated his songs, likeness, the Beach Boys trademark, and the Smile album in connection with BWPS. The suit was dismissed.

=== 2005–2025: Continued activity and final years ===
In October 2005, Arista Records released Wilson's album What I Really Want for Christmas, which consisted of renditions of Christmas standards plus two new originals by Wilson. In 2007, the Southbank Centre in London commissioned Wilson to create a new song cycle in the style of Smile. Collaborating with band member Scott Bennett, Wilson reconfigured a collection of recently written songs into That Lucky Old Sun, a semi-autobiographical conceptual piece about California. A studio-recorded version of the work was released as his seventh solo album in September 2008 and received generally favorable reviews. (Note: Around this time, Wilson announced he was developing a new concept album titled Pleasure Island: A Rock Fantasy. He explained that the project centered on a group of men who discover a place called Pleasure Island, where they encounter various women and attractions. Although the concept was not yet fully developed, he expressed optimism about its potential, suggesting it might become his finest work.)

In 2009, Wilson was approached by Walt Disney Records to record a Disney songs album, agreeing only if he could also record an album of George Gershwin songs. The Gershwin project, Brian Wilson Reimagines Gershwin, was released in August 2010, reaching number 26 on the Billboard 200 and topping its Jazz Albums chart. Wilson then toured, performing the album in its entirety. In October 2011, he released In the Key of Disney, which peaked at number 83 in the U.S. This release was soon overshadowed by The Smile Sessions, issued one week later.

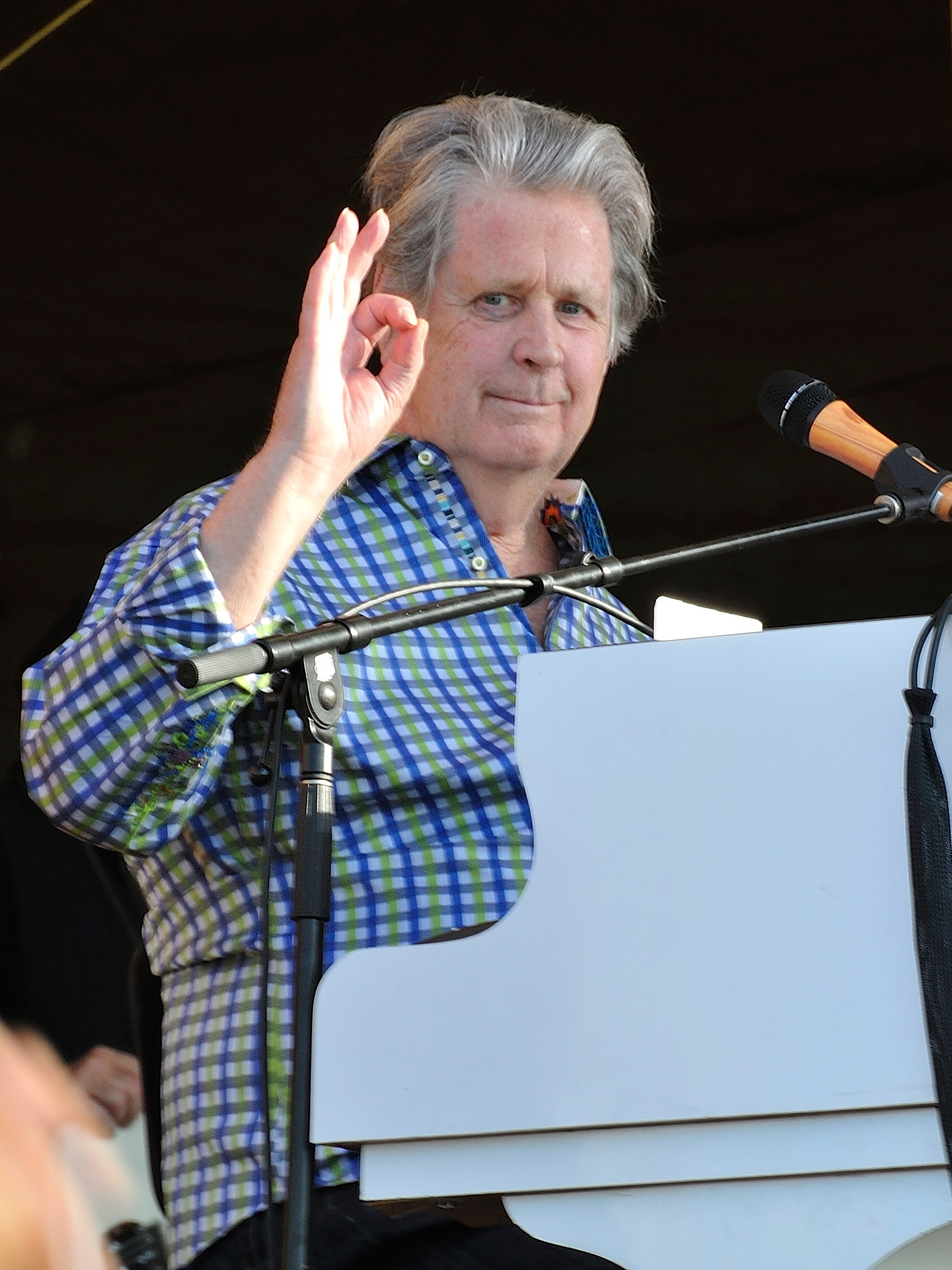
Wilson performing with the Beach Boys during their brief 2012 reunion

In mid-2011, Wilson reunited with Mike Love, Al Jardine, David Marks, and Bruce Johnston to re-record "Do It Again" in secret for a potential 50th anniversary album. Rumors soon circulated in the music press about a world tour by the group. In a September report, Wilson said he was not participating in the tour with his bandmates: "I don't really like working with the guys, but it all depends on how we feel and how much money's involved. Money's not the only reason I made records, but it does hold a place in our lives." Ultimately, Wilson agreed to the tour, lasting until September 2012, and to record the album That's Why God Made the Radio, released in June 2012. By that time, Wilson had renewed his creative partnership with Joe Thomas. Although Wilson was listed as the album's producer, Thomas was credited with "recording" and Love with "executive producer".

In June 2013, Wilson's website announced that he was recording and self-producing new material with Don Was, Al Jardine, David Marks, Blondie Chaplin, and Jeff Beck. In January 2014, Wilson declared in an interview that the Beck collaborations would not be released.

In September 2014, Wilson attended the premiere of Bill Pohlad's biopic Love & Mercy at the Toronto International Film Festival. He had contributed "One Kind of Love" to the film, which later received a Golden Globe nomination for Best Original Song. In October, BBC released a re-recorded version of "God Only Knows" —featuring Wilson, Brian May, Elton John, Jake Bugg, Stevie Wonder, Lorde, and others—to commemorate the launch of BBC Music. A week later, he was featured as a guest vocalist on Emile Haynie's single "Falling Apart". His cover of Paul McCartney's "Wanderlust" was included on the tribute album The Art of McCartney in November.

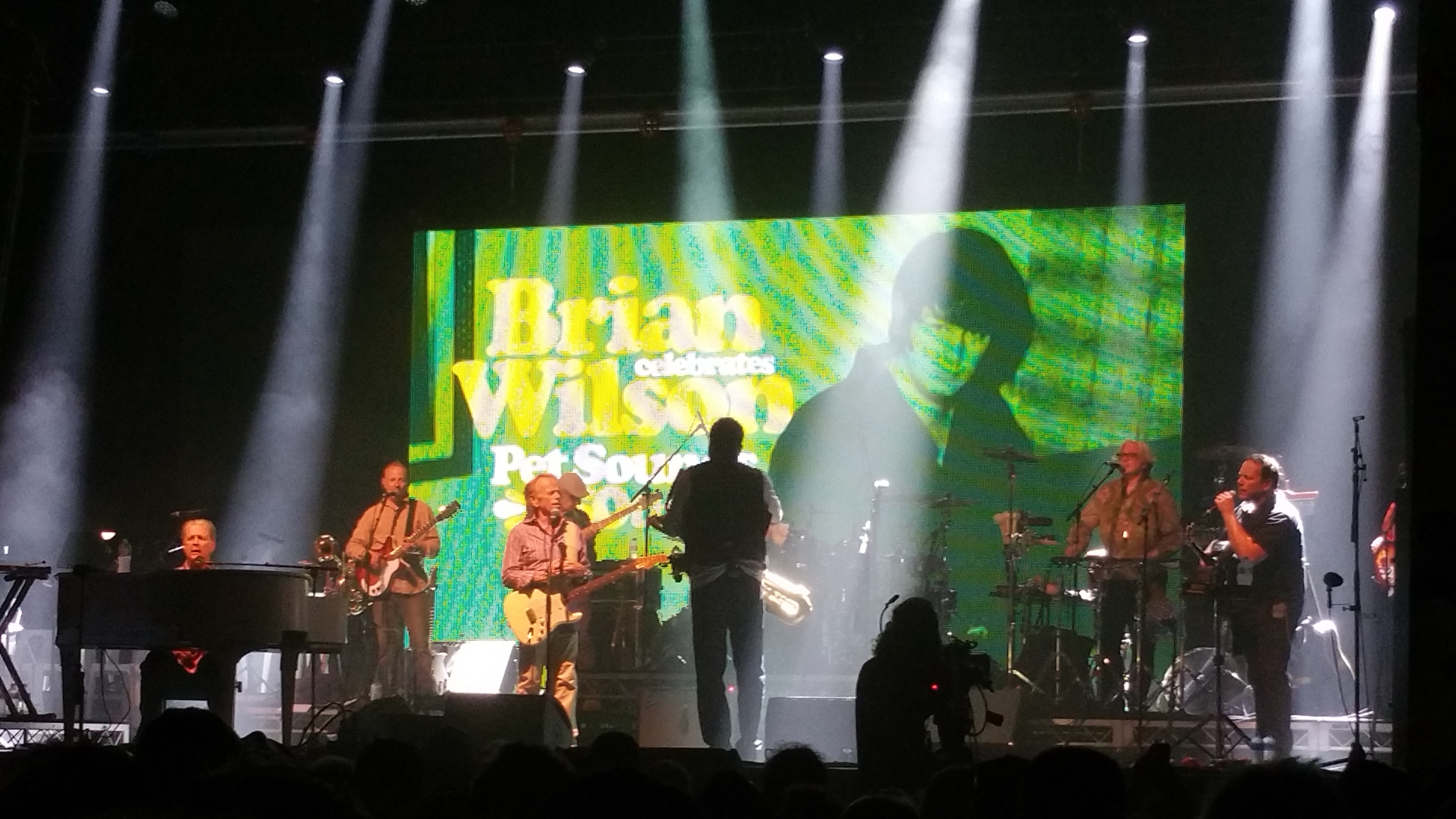
Wilson performing Pet Sounds at Byron Bay Bluesfest, 2016

Released in April 2015, No Pier Pressure marked another collaboration between Wilson and Joe Thomas, featuring guest appearances from Jardine, Marks, Chaplin, and others. The album reached the U.S. top 30, but critical reaction was mixed due to its adult contemporary arrangements and extensive use of autotune. (Note: Fans had reacted negatively to the announcement that Wilson would be recording a duets album, prompting a Facebook post, attributed to Wilson, that said, "In my life in music, I've been told too many times not to fuck with the formula, but as an artist it's my job to do that.") In March 2016, Wilson and Al Jardine began the Pet Sounds 50th Anniversary World Tour, billed as his final performances of the album. (Note: Later that year, Wilson announced a new album, Sensitive Music for Sensitive People, comprising originals and rock and roll cover songs. He said the name as a "working title" and that recording would begin in December.)

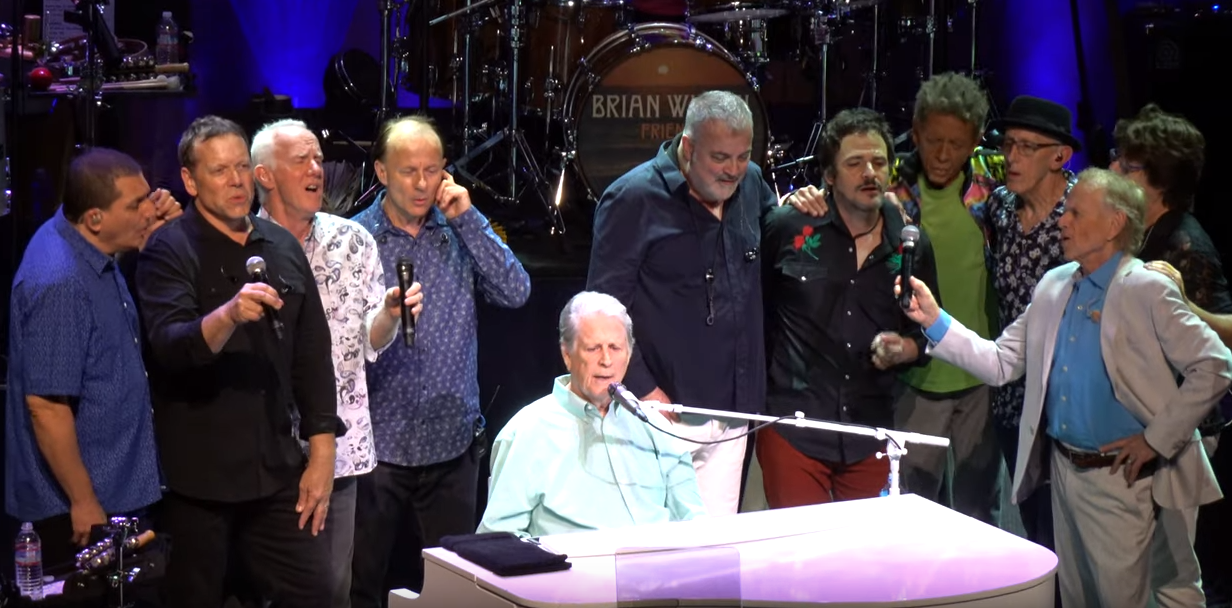
Wilson performing at the Count Basie Theater in New Jersey, 2019

By the late 2010s, Wilson was reliant on a walker following two back surgeries. In 2019, some concert dates were postponed due to his worsening mental health issues before his social media declared one month later that he had recovered and would resume touring. He paused his tours in 2020 due to the COVID-19 pandemic and again resumed touring in August 2021. In November, two releases followed: At My Piano, consisting of new instrumental piano recordings of his songs, and the soundtrack to Brian Wilson: Long Promised Road, which includes both new and previously unreleased recordings. At the end of 2021, he sold his publishing rights to Universal Music Publishing Group for $50 million. He was paid almost $32 million for his songwriter share plus $19 million for his reversion rights (his ability to reclaim his song rights within a time period after signing them away under the Copyright Act of 1976). In 2022, his ex-wife Marilyn, who had been awarded half of his songwriting royalties, sued him for $6.7 million.

On July 26, 2022, Wilson played his final concert, as part of a joint tour with Chicago at the Pine Knob Music Theatre in Clarkston, Michigan, where he was reported to have "sat rigid and expressionless" throughout the performance. Days later, he cancelled his remaining tour dates for that year, with his management citing "unforeseen health reasons". During a January 2023 appearance on a Beach Boys fan podcast, Wilson's daughter Carnie reported that her father was "probably not going to tour anymore, which is heartbreaking".

In January 2024, Melinda Ledbetter died at their home. The following month, it was announced that Wilson had dementia and was placed under another conservatorship, which began in May 2024. He had completed two tracks as part of a forthcoming solo album produced by Joe Thomas and Jonathan Wilson (no relation) before the project was abandoned following Thomas' death that April.

== Death, tributes, and posthumous releases ==
Wilson died in his sleep at his Beverly Hills home on June 11, 2025, at the age of 82. Al Jardine, who had since reformed Wilson's concert band as his own, later reported that Wilson had been struggling with long-term effects of COVID-19 since his final tour in 2022: "That was the end of it. He never came back after that." His primary cause of death was declared as respiratory arrest amid sepsis, cystitis, and other associated factors. He was cremated, and his ashes were interred next to his brother Carl in Westwood Memorial Park in Beverly Hills, California.

Family and associates, including Jardine, Mike Love and Blondie Chaplin, paid tribute to Wilson on social media, while media outlets published eulogies written by Van Dyke Parks, Darian Sahanaja, biographer David Leaf, and co-manager Jean Sievers. Many other musicians, artists, and celebrities offered public acknowledgements. (Note: This included Paul McCartney, Bruce Springsteen, James Hetfield, Bob Dylan, Elton John, Carole King, Questlove, Keith Richards, Ronnie Wood, Mick Fleetwood, Maggie Rogers, Ringo Starr, Sean Lennon, Dewey Bunnell, Gerry Beckley, Nancy Sinatra, John Cale, Micky Dolenz, Randy Bachman, Gene Simmons, Paul Stanley, David Paich, Christopher Cross, John Cusack, Graham Nash, Disclosure, Carter Faith, Gavin DeGraw, John Stamos, Zooey Deschanel, Peter Rosenberg Diane Warren, Clairo, Gracie Abrams, Bill Pohlad, Elizabeth Banks, Margo Price, Brian Ray, Dave Davies, Low Cut Connie, Rick Springfield, and Peter Gabriel. In addition, Dave Matthews, Sting, and Guster performed separate impromptu renditions of "God Only Knows" at their concerts.)

At the time of his death, Wilson had left behind a substantial body of unreleased work, including the albums Adult/Child and Sweet Insanity, a large collection of 1980s demos, and recordings created with Dennis Wilson, Gary Usher, Andy Paley, and Joe Thomas. There were also tentative releases scheduled for Adult/Child and the Paley sessions. Cows in the Pasture, the unfinished album he had produced for Fred Vail in 1970, had been planned for release in 2025 alongside a docuseries about Vail and the album's making. In 2026, Adult/Child was released as a part of We Gotta Groove: The Brother Studio Years, an expanded reissue of Love You.

== Musical influences ==
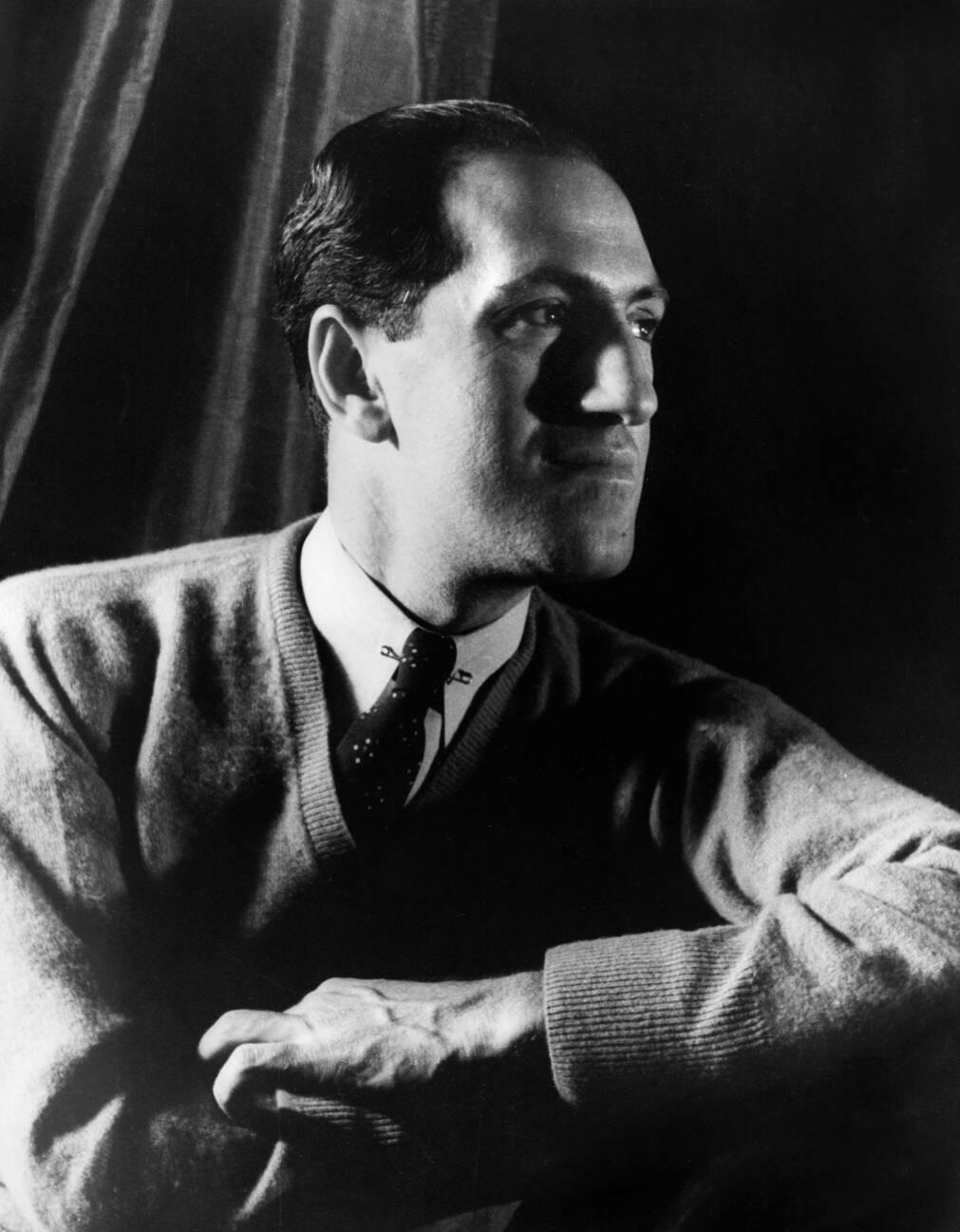
George Gershwin (pictured in 1937) was one of Wilson's main formative influences.

Wilson's chordal vocabulary derived primarily from rock and roll, doo-wop, and vocal jazz. At age two, he heard Glenn Miller's 1943 rendition of Gershwin's Rhapsody in Blue, an experience that left a lasting emotional impact—later saying, "It sort of became a general life theme". As a child, his favorite artists included Roy Rogers, Carl Perkins, Bill Haley, Elvis Presley, Henry Mancini, and Rosemary Clooney. He recalled Haley's "Rock Around the Clock" (1954) as the first music he felt compelled to learn and sing. His education in music composition and jazz harmony largely came from deconstructing the vocal harmonies of the Four Freshmen, whose repertoire included works by Gershwin, Jerome Kern, and Cole Porter. (Note: Lambert noted that if Four Freshmen singer Bob Flanigan "helped teach Brian how to sing, then Gershwin, Kern, Porter, and the other members of this pantheon helped him learn how to craft a song". Tony Asher recalled that Wilson had minimal familiarity with Tin Pan Alley songs beyond the Four Freshmen's repertoire during the creation of Pet Sounds.)

Wilson credited his mother with introducing him to the Four Freshmen, attributing his love for harmonies and the human voice to their "groovy sectional sound". Their 1956 album Freshmen Favorites was the first pop album that Wilson listened to in its entirety and he regarded Voices in Love (1958) as "probably the greatest single vocal album I've ever heard". He greatly admired the group's arrangers, Pete Rugolo and Dick Reynolds, the latter's services he later employed for the Beach Boys' Christmas album and Adult/Child. It is likely that Wilson learned nearly the entirety of the Four Freshmen's recorded repertoire through 1961, after which his obsession with the group diminished. In addition to the Four Freshmen, Mike Love recalled Wilson "playing and studying a lot of Ricky Nelson, the Four Preps, and the Hi-Los". (Note: The Four Preps' influence has been "largely underappreciated" by journalists and historians, according to Murphy.)

Inquired for his music tastes in 1961, Wilson replied, "top 10". Particular favorites included Chuck Berry, the Coasters, and the Everly Brothers. He particularly admired Berry's "rhythm and lyrical thoughts". Carl said that he and his brother "were total Chuck Berry freaks" and together sang Coasters songs with Four Freshmen-style arrangements before the Beach Boys formed. Brian disliked surf music; in the estimation of biographer Timothy White, he instead sought a "new plateau midway between Gershwin and the best Four Freshmen material" when forming his band. Gershwin's influence became more pronounced later in his career, particularly after the 1970s when he dedicated himself to learning the violin parts from Rhapsody in Blue. In 1994, he recorded a choral version of the piece with Van Dyke Parks.

Wilson was also significantly influenced by Frankie Valli and the Four Seasons, Nelson Riddle, the Motown sound, (Note: Regarding his increasingly melodic bass lines in the mid-1960s, Granata speculated that Wilson "may have taken a cue" from Motown's James Jamerson.) Disney film soundtracks such as Mary Poppins (1964), and soul musicians such as Smokey Robinson and Stevie Wonder. Wendy Carlos's 1969 album Switched-On Bach, described by Wilson as "one of the most electrifying records" he had ever heard, influenced his use of synthesizers.

The Beatles inspired me. They didn't influence me.

— Brian Wilson, 2015

It is often reported that the Beach Boys and the Beatles influenced each other, although Wilson rejected the notion, saying he "studied [Phil Spector] way more than The Beatles or any other music." (Note: Carl supported that Brian had preferred Spector over the Beatles, although his brother "loved the Beatles' later music when they evolved and started making intelligent, masterful music". Mike Love remarked of the Beatles' influence on Wilson in 1969, "Brian was in his own world, believe me.") He acknowledged that he had felt threatened by the Beatles' success and that this awareness drove him to concentrate his efforts on trying to outdo them in the studio. He praised Paul McCartney's stylistic versatility and commended his bass playing as "technically fantastic".

During the 1970s, Wilson developed a longtime obsession with the folk standard "Shortnin' Bread", recording numerous unreleased variations of the song. According to Alice Cooper, he had proclaimed it "the greatest song ever written". In 1976, Wilson commented that he felt contemporary popular music had lacked the artistic integrity it once had, with Queen's "Bohemian Rhapsody" (1975) being one exception. In a 1988 interview, he named the 1982 compilation Stevie Wonder's Original Musiquarium I and Paul Simon's 1986 release Graceland among his ten favorite albums of all time. In 2007, he cited Billy Joel as his favorite pianist. By 2015, he maintained that he did not listen to modern music, only "oldies but goodies".

=== Spector and Bacharach ===
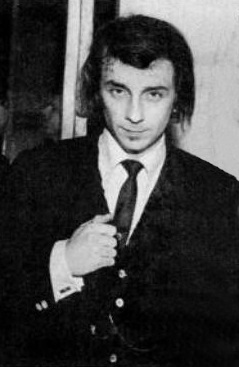
Wilson said of Phil Spector (pictured in 1965), "I really respect him as a producer—so I just copied him."

Phil Spector's influence on Wilson is widely acknowledged. He referred to Spector as "the single most influential producer" in 1966, and "probably the biggest influence of all" in 2000. Initially drawn to Spector's records for the Crystals and the Ronettes, by his account, his admiration began in 1962 upon hearing "He's Sure the Boy I Love", which he said "opened up a door of creativity for me". He particularly admired Spector's method of treating "the song as one giant instrument", valuing the enormous, spacious sound, with "the best drums I ever heard". Upon hearing the Ronettes' 1963 hit "Be My Baby" on his car radio, he immediately pulled over and declared it the greatest record he had ever heard. (Note: Carlin describes the song as having become "a spiritual touchstone" for Wilson, while music historian Luis Sanchez states that it formed an enduring part of Wilson's mythology, being the Spector record that "etched itself the deepest into Brian's mind".) Within days, record producer Lou Adler personally introduced the two producers, and they subsequently developed a rapport.

Frequently attending Spector's recording sessions at Gold Star Studios, Wilson consulted him directly on his methods. (Note: Wilson played piano at a session for Spector's 1963 Christmas album, often cited as Wilson's favorite album of all time.) Gold Star staff engineer Larry Levine stated that Spector "loved what Brian was doing" and considered him "one of the great producers", although other accounts suggest Spector was dismissive of Wilson's abilities on some occasions. (Note: According to Levine, Spector "would often run off on a diatribe about Capitol not making Brian the producer ... He felt that Brian deserved all of the credit, all of the money, and every bit of recognition that went along with producing his own records." Spector himself stated in a 1977 interview, "Brian is a very sweet guy and a nice human being ... But I never saw [him] as a competitor.") Following Spector's example, he had taken full production control for the Beach Boys by 1963, and despite his assertion that he had "learned how to produce" from watching Spector, Levine countered, "the truth is, he was already producing records before he observed Phil." (Note: Wilson, in 1988, told an interviewer that he had "learned from him but I did not copy him", having described his own studio experimentation as "definitely a part of me, not something Phil Spector would do.") Wilson submitted "Don't Worry Baby" and "Don't Hurt My Little Sister", both written with the Ronettes in mind, but Spector declined. He also declared "You've Lost That Lovin' Feelin'" upon its release to be the greatest record ever and later recorded many unreleased studio renditions of the song.

Asked for songs that he wished he had written, Wilson listed three: "You've Lost That Lovin' Feelin'", "Be My Baby", and Burt Bacharach's "Here I Am", the latter composer being often overlooked by scholars as an influence. Wilson named Bacharach, alongside Spector and Chuck Berry, as his main chordal influences, and said that Bacharach had a "profound" influence that "got me going in a direction". (Note: In 1966, he said, "Burt Bacharach and Hal David are more like me. They're also the best pop team—per se—today. As a producer, Bacharach has a very fresh, new approach.") In the late-1960s, Wilson produced renditions of Bacharach's "My Little Red Book" and "Walk On By", both withheld from release. In a 1998 interview, he called Bacharach "probably the greatest songwriting genius of the 20th century" and rated him "better than George Gershwin". (Note: Music journalist Domenic Priore believed that Bacharach's "Walk on By" was possibly as influential to Wilson as "Be My Baby". Wilson said that Bacharach was a direct influence on "She Knows Me Too Well", "Let's Go Away for Awhile", and "Love and Mercy". Writers have variously attributed Bacharach's influence on Wilson's "Guess I'm Dumb", "Let Him Run Wild, and "The Little Girl I Once Knew".)

== Artistry ==
=== Composition ===
Wilson's early piano sketch of "Don't Talk (Put Your Head on My Shoulder)"
Home recording of Wilson performing the basic chord patterns of "Don't Talk (Put Your Head on My Shoulder)".

Wilson's writing process, as he described in 1966, started with finding a basic chord pattern and rhythm that he termed "feels", or "brief note sequences, fragments of ideas". He explained, "Once they're out of my head and into the open air, I can see them and touch them firmly." He wrote later that he aspired to write songs that appear "simple, no matter how complex it really is".

Common devices in Wilson's musical structures include jazz chords, such as sevenths and ninths. Wilson attributed his use of minor seventh chords to his affinity for the music of Bacharach. Chord inversions, particularly using a tonic with a fifth in the bass, are also prevalent in his work, again influenced by Bacharach. He sometimes rooted the bass on a major seventh scale degree; Probyn Gregory commented: "there are modern avant-garde composers that do that, but someone that was as popular as Brian Wilson was in popular music, it just wasn't done ... I don't think even J.S. Bach ever did that." The flattened subtonic, which is common in the music of the Four Freshmen and popular music in general, is the nondiatonic chord that appears the most in Wilson's compositions. Sudden breaks into a cappella segments, again borrowed from the Four Freshmen, are another feature of his music, having been employed in "Salt Lake City" (1965) and "Sloop John B" (1966).

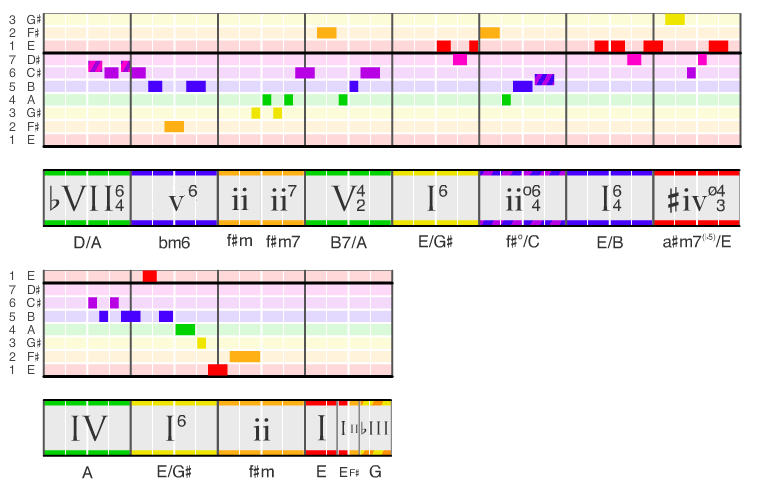
A visual representation of the functionally ambiguous harmonic structure of "God Only Knows".

Many of Wilson's compositions are marked by destabilized tonal centers. He frequently used key changes within verses and choruses, including "truck driver's modulations", to create dynamic shifts. Chromaticism and tertian movement are other recurring harmonic devices in his work. His bass parts are often melodic and prominent within his arrangements, with his most extensive use of chromaticism, particularly through a descending bass line, displayed in the a cappella composition "Our Prayer" (1969).

Some of Wilson's songs incorporate a I – IV – I – V pattern, a formula derived from "Da Doo Ron Ron", as well as a circle of fifths sequence that begins with the mediant (iii), inspired by "Be My Baby". He frequently uses stepwise-falling melodic lines, stepwise diatonic rises, and whole-step root movements. Numerous songs alternate between supertonic and dominant chords or tonic and flattened subtonic chords, the latter featuring in the verses of "Guess I'm Dumb" and the intro to "California Girls". Other songs are characterized by "syncopated exercises and counterpoints piled on top of jittery eighth-note clusters and loping shuffle grooves", features that took "an almost manic edge" in Wilson's work during the 1970s, according to producer Alan Boyd.

=== Lyrics ===
I don't carry a notebook or use a tape player. I like to tell a story in the songs with as few words as possible. I sort of tend to write what I've been through and look inside myself. Some of the songs are messages.

— Brian Wilson, 1977

Wilson generally collaborated with another lyricist, although he occasionally composed both words and music alone. Most of his songs explore introspective themes, and several portray the male object or narrator as a "loser", evident on "She Knows Me Too Well", "Don't Hurt My Little Sister", "Merry Christmas, Baby", and "All Dressed Up for School". Other recurring themes in Wilson's songs include feminine objectification, (Note: Songs centered on feminine objectification include "The Shift", "Pom, Pom Play Girl", "Girls on the Beach", and "All Dressed Up for School".) youthful innocence, (Note: Songs centered on youthful innocence include "The Little Girl I Once Knew", "Caroline, No", "Wonderful", "Song for Children", "Surf's Up", and "Little Children".) slice of life stories, (Note: His slice of life songs include "Time to Get Alone", "I'd Love Just Once to See You", "Wake the World", "Busy Doin' Nothin'", and "I Went to Sleep".) and health and fitness. (Note: Songs centered on health and fitness include "Vegetables", "H.E.L.P. Is On the Way", "Life Is for the Living", "He Couldn't Get His Poor Old Body to Move", and "Too Much Sugar".)

Although the Beach Boys became known for surfing imagery, his compositions with collaborators outside the band typically avoided this subject matter. Unlike his contemporaries, social issues were never referenced in his lyrics. (Note: Wilson acknowledged that he had "never been the type" to preach social messages in his songs.) In his 2008 book Dark Mirror: The Pathology of the Singer-Songwriter, Donald Brackett identifies Wilson as "the Carl Sandburg and Robert Frost of popular music—deceptively simple, colloquial in phrasing, with a spare and evocative lyrical style embedded in the culture that created it". Brackett opined that Wilson expressed "intense fragility" and "emotional vulnerability" to degrees that few other singer-songwriters had.

=== Production ===
Through his engrossment in Spector's music, Wilson learned to approach records in terms of production rather than only songwriting. Further to Spector's influence, Wilson rarely used ride or crash cymbals and often combined color tones within groupings of instruments to produce novel sounds. (Note: Other practices he adopted from Spector included recording two echo chambers simultaneously and having standup and Fender bass play identical parts.) His own production style incorporated block chord textures with saxophones, bass harmonicas, and occasionally accordions, an emphasized downbeat, and triple basses (two electric with different tones and one upright) to create a prominent low end. He usually instructed his drummer to play only the snare and floor-tom afterbeats characteristic of Spector's records, albeit with a lower snare drum tuning. His bass lines were usually played with a hard plectrum, which imparted a more percussive quality, a technique he adapted from Motown.

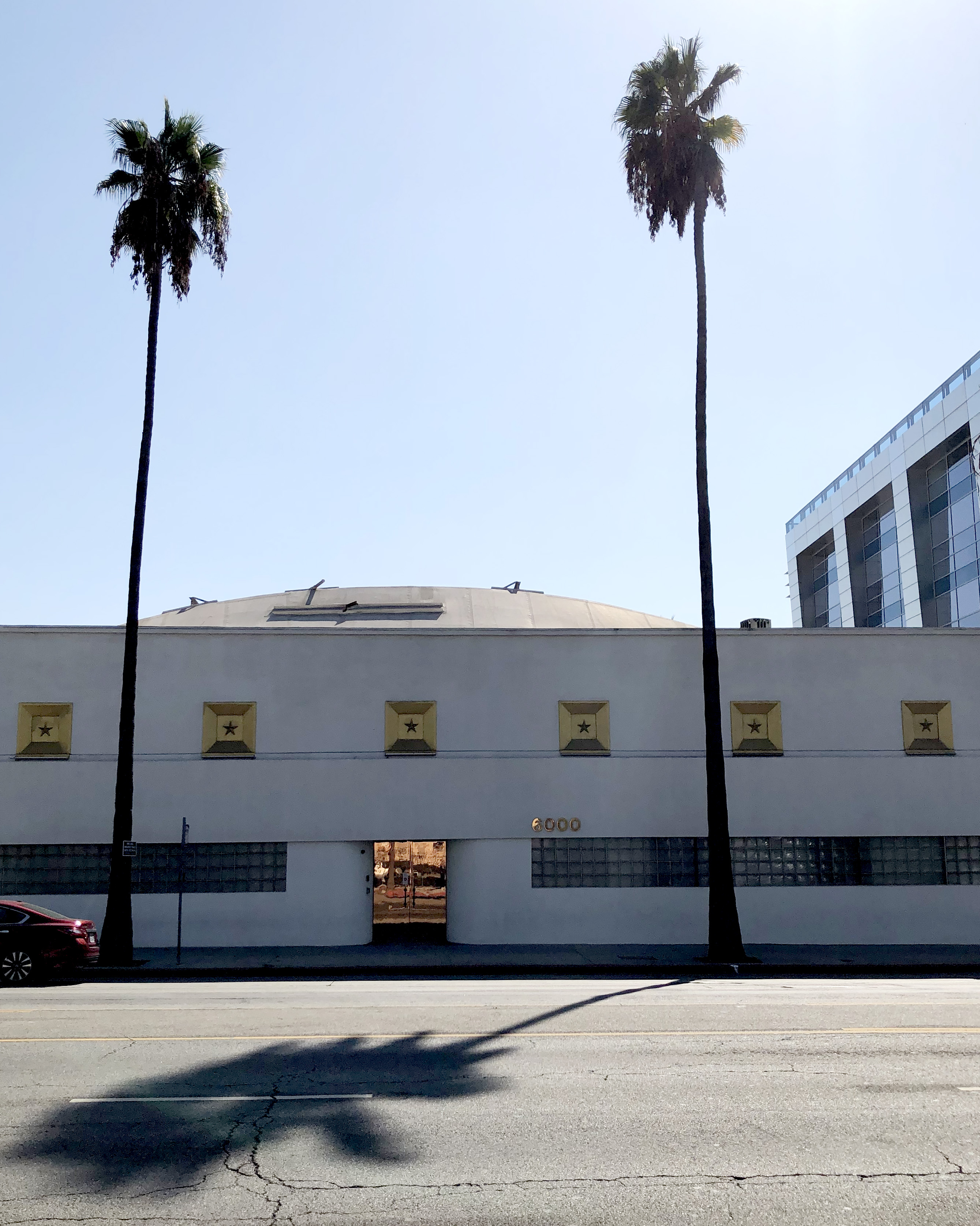
Exterior of Western Studio in Hollywood, Wilson's preferred recording facility in the mid-1960s.

Wilson established approximately one-third of a song's final arrangement during the writing process, with the remainder developed in the studio. (Note: He elaborated in 1990, "As I write a song, I write some of the instrumental piano and pluck some of the different notes for the arrangement. It's impossible to lay the whole arrangement on the piano but you play just enough to get the overall feelin' of the record. It is an art in itself.") He preferred recording in the Studio 3 room at Western for its privacy and the presence of staff engineer Chuck Britz, who served as Wilson's principal engineer from 1962 to 1967. While Britz typically handled technical tasks like level mixing and microphone placement, Wilson made extensive adjustments to the setup, usurping standard studio protocols of the era that limited console use to assigned engineers. Once Britz prepared an initial configuration, Wilson took control of the console, directing session musicians from the booth using an intercom or non-verbal cues alongside chord charts. Britz recalled that Wilson would work with the players until he achieved the desired sound, a process that frequently lasted for hours.

His studio musicians, a group later known as the Wrecking Crew, were drawn from Spector's productions. (Note: Dean Torrence stated that Wilson learned much about studio technology from Jan Berry, who advised him to use session musicians to expedite recording instead of waiting for the Beach Boys to finish touring.) He occasionally recorded at the Spector-favored Gold Star Studios, where most of Wilson's sessions were engineered by Stan Ross. (Note: Larry Levine fully engineered one Wilson record, "Be True to Your School", while Spector's principal arranger Jack Nitzsche contributed the arrangements for the Honeys' "From Jimmy with Tears" and "Raindrops", produced by Wilson.) He first used the Wrecking Crew for productions with the Honeys in March 1963, and, during June sessions for Surfer Girl, gradually integrated these musicians into Beach Boys records. (Note: Contrary to the common misconception that these musicians completely replaced the band on backing tracks after the early 1960s, this substitution occurred primarily on most tracks of Pet Sounds and Smile.) Until 1965, the band members typically performed the instrumentation, but as Wilson's sessions came to necessitate 11 or more different players, his reliance on the Wrecking Crew increased. In 1966 and 1967, he almost exclusively used these musicians for the backing tracks, although their involvement diminished considerably after 1967. The musicians, many trained in conservatories, were impressed by his abilities and, unlike most producers, he never required them to devise their own parts. Drummer Hal Blaine, who guided the tempo of Wilson's songs and assisted in developing their skeletal arrangements, recalled that all of the musicians "helped arrange". (Note: Bassist Carol Kaye recounted that the group "were in awe of Brian", while guitarist Jerry Cole recalled that he and his fellow players "would walk out of Brian's sessions shaking our heads, saying, 'This son of a bitch is either crazy, or he's an absolute genius.'" Having played under both producers, Cole felt Wilson was "far superior intellectually and musically" to Spector and "a world apart". Kaye added that Wilson's basslines were admired by "a lot of jazz musicians" for the manner in which he "used bass as the framework for a hit record". Keyboardist Don Randi similarly expressed admiration for Wilson's chord choices, referring to him as "the Bill Evans of rock 'n' roll".)

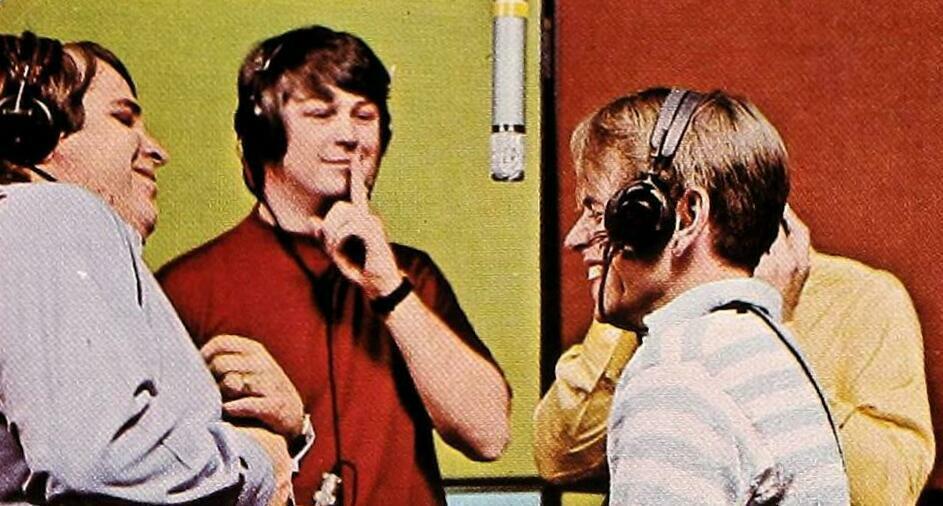
Wilson with his bandmates at a Pet Sounds vocal session, early 1966

His first use of a string section was on "The Surfer Moon" in mid-1963. Before Pet Sounds, he seldom used string ensembles, preferring to overdub them after recording the basic instrumental track, which was then followed by vocal overdubs. Beginning with the 1963 track "Surfin' U.S.A.", he double-tracked the vocals, resulting in a more resonant sound.

Starting in 1964, Wilson performed tape splices on his recordings, usually to allow difficult vocal sections to be performed by the group. By 1965, he had become more adventurous in his use of tape splicing. These experiments culminated with the complex editing processes adopted for "Good Vibrations" and Smile. Mark Linett, who engineered Wilson's recordings from the 1980s on, stated, "He certainly wasn't the first person to do edits, but it was unusual to record a song in four or five sections, and then cut it together."

Like Spector, Wilson preferred mono mixdowns. According to Wilson, after his first nervous breakdown in 1964, he had endeavored to "take the things I learned from Phil Spector" and maximize his instrumental palette. He later cited "California Girls" as his first full application of Spector's "studio as an instrument" concept. The 2003 book Temples of Sound states that Wilson distinguished himself from Spector through the usage of certain instruments, such as banjo, and by possessing a "clean muscle" missing in Spector's work. In Priore's assessment, Wilson reconfigured Spector's Wall of Sound techniques in pursuit of "audio clarity" and "a more lush, comfortable feel" rather than cumulatively building the arrangement to "the eleventh degree".

=== Singing ===
Wilson singing the chorus of "Don't Worry Baby" (1964)
Wilson's lead on "Don't Worry Baby" is regarded as one of his defining vocal performances.

Wilson's vocal style was shaped by studying the Four Freshmen, from whom he developed a versatile head voice that allowed him to hit high notes without resorting to falsetto, although he did use falsetto on some Beach Boys tracks. He recalled that he "learned how to sing falsetto" through listening to Four Freshmen renditions. Rosemary Clooney also influenced his singing; by mimicking her phrasing on recordings like "Hey There", he learned "to sing with feeling".

Initially, his singing was characterized by a pure tenor voice; later in life, he employed this range only rarely. Fearing that a high vocal delivery might fuel perceptions of homosexuality, he avoided it. After the early 1970s, his voice degraded following heavy cigarette and cocaine use, with 15 Big Ones marking the emergence of what biographer Peter Ames Carlin termed Wilson's "baritone croak". In a 1999 interview, Wilson compared his style to Bob Dylan's "harsh, raspy voice".

== Mental health ==
Wilson was diagnosed with schizoaffective disorder and mild bipolar disorder. From 1965 on, he regularly experienced auditory hallucinations in the form of disembodied voices. Wilson referred to the voices as "heroes and villains" that contributed to "a life of scare". His family and associates had faced challenges in discerning genuine mental health problems from potential manipulative behavior on Wilson's part. Subsequent to his Houston flight incident from December 1964, Marilyn arranged his first psychiatrist visit, where it was ruled that Wilson's condition was due to work-related fatigue. (Note: Wilson typically refused counseling, and his family believed his idiosyncrasies stemmed from drug habits or were innate to his personality. Gaines goes on to write that Brian receiving "intense psychiatric care in a hospital setting" would have been perceived as "an admission of defeat and an embarrassment" to his bandmates. Carlin recounted an episode where a friend from Wilson's childhood days visited him and observed him as being "detached from reality"; Wilson's family seemed "less sympathetic than confused and, it's hard not to conclude, resentful". Marilyn countered accusations of neglect on her part and stated she had made repeated efforts to get him professional help.) According to Wilson, he was introduced to recreational drugs by an acquaintance during a Beach Boys tour, and his hallucinations emerged early in 1965, about a week after his first time using psychedelics. Loren Schwartz, his supplier, said that Wilson's first dosage was 125 micrograms of "pure Owsley" (LSD) and resulted in "full-on ego death". (Note: Brian remembered taking the LSD at his home, but according to Marilyn, he took the drug elsewhere with Schwartz. By her recollection, he returned home the next day and recounted his experience, telling her repeatedly that his "mind was blown" and that he had seen God.)

[In mid-1965, Brian had] asked me to come down to Studio B. When we got down there, he said to me, "Let me play something that I hear when I've been on LSD." He sat down at the piano and played one note. He described what he was hearing. That's when I knew he was in trouble.

— Four Freshmen manager Bill Wagner

In 1990, Wilson attributed his developing "a Jesus Christ complex" in the mid-1960s to the use of LSD. Mike Love saw signs of irregular behavior in Wilson by July 1965, recalling an incident where Wilson deliberately crashed his car. His drug use was initially concealed from his bandmates and family, including Love, who had thought Wilson to be strictly opposed to drugs. (Note: In his memoir, Love wrote of an incident in which he had discovered drug paraphernalia in Wilson's hotel room during a tour stop in Texas in the early 1960s. Love was unsure of the drug contents, although it was certainly not marijuana, and he did not confront Wilson about the matter.) Following the advice of Four Freshmen manager Bill Wagner, Wilson consulted with a psychiatrist at the University of California, Los Angeles, on the adverse effects of LSD; the psychiatrist later told Wagner, "I don't know if he is savable. He gives me the impression he's been on it for a while, and he's entirely enamored of it." By 1966, Wilson acknowledged using "pills" for introspection rather than leisure and viewed psychedelic usage as benign. His 2016 memoir states that he abstained from consuming LSD for a second time until he was 23, in either 1966 or 1967. Marilyn suspected he had numerous LSD experiences in the ensuing years, although she knew of only two such incidents at the time. Ledbetter, in 2004, claimed Wilson had taken LSD only three times in his life. (Note: Micky Dolenz recalled an occasion in the 1970s where he took LSD with Wilson, Harry Nilsson, and John Lennon in Malibu. Dolenz said that Wilson "played just one note on a piano over and over again" for the duration.)

As Wilson's condition worsened, he grew susceptible to paranoid delusions, including believing that his auditory hallucinations were Satan coming "in the form of other people that were competing with me and had ideas of killing me". By 1968, following the birth of their first child, Marilyn's concerns about Wilson's mental health intensified. Wilson was hospitalized later that year and prescribed Thorazine for severe anxiety disorder. He may have self-admitted, and possibly received treatments ranging from talk therapy to doses of lithium and electroconvulsive therapy during this stay.

Wilson was given the later-retracted diagnosis of paranoid schizophrenia, in addition to manic-depressive psychosis, when he was a patient at Brotman Memorial Hospital in 1978. Landy, in 1976, had initially refuted such a diagnosis, suggesting Wilson's main issue was "being scared". In 1984, doctors again misdiagnosed Wilson with schizophrenia, also finding evidence of brain damage caused by drug use. In the late 1980s, he developed facial tics (tardive dyskinesia) that resulted from medication administered by Landy. Therapist Peter Reum stated that Wilson would have deteriorated into a "drooling, palsied mental patient" and potentially died of heart failure had he continued this drug regimen. (Note: In 1991, Wilson told reporters that his prescribed medications included Navane and Serentil (anti-psychotics), Cogentin (to mitigate the side effects of the anti-psychotics), Xanax (a sedative used for anxiety), and Eskalith (for manic depression).) In a 2002 interview, Wilson stated, "I don't regret [the Landy program]. I loved the guy—he saved me."

After Wilson sought medical care elsewhere, he was declared to have organic personality disorder. (Note: Musician Sean O'Hagan, who was invited to collaborate with Wilson in the 1990s, characterized Wilson as "totally dependent on other people", with signs reminiscent of autism.) His mental condition improved in later years, although his auditory hallucinations persisted, especially when performing onstage. He credited his relationship with his second wife for allowing him to resume his career as a musician. In his own words, he said that he should have spent the early 2000s "in a mental institution under heavy sedation" due to the stresses of his condition; however, "Things have started to get a little bit easier, but I'm not always in a positive, happy place." In 2002, he lamented that treatment had inhibited his creativity.

== Personal life ==
=== Deafness in right ear ===
At age 11, during a Christmas choir recital, it was found that Wilson had significantly diminished hearing in his right ear. The issue was diagnosed as a nerve impingement. The exact cause remains unclear. (Note: It is improbable that Wilson was born partially deaf as such defects generally manifest earlier. Wilson himself believed the deafness might have resulted from his father slapping him shortly before turning three, although he also stated in a 2000 interview that his deafness had been present at birth and unrelated to his father's physical abuse. Murry commented that the deafness may have resulted from a football game injury, while Wilson's mother, Audree, said that Wilson believed the incident occurred when he was around 10 and a child hit his ear, a claim repeated in his 2016 memoir. On another occasion, Audree attributed it to Murry hitting Wilson with an iron while he was asleep.) Due to this infirmity, Wilson developed a habit of speaking from the side of his mouth, giving the false impression that he had suffered a stroke. He also experienced tinnitus. In the late 1960s, he underwent corrective surgery that was unsuccessful in restoring his hearing.

=== Relationships and children ===
Wilson's first serious relationship was with Judy Bowles, a high school student he had met at a baseball game in mid-1961. The couple were engaged during Christmas 1963 and were to be married the following December. She inspired his songs "Judy" (1962), "Surfer Girl" (1963), and, according to some accounts, "The Warmth of the Sun" (1964), the latter being written shortly after they had separated. Around then, he gradually became romantically involved with singer Marilyn Rovell, whom he had met in August 1962. Inspired by a remark from Marilyn's older sister Diane, Wilson wrote "Don't Hurt My Little Sister" (1965) about his early relationship with Marilyn.

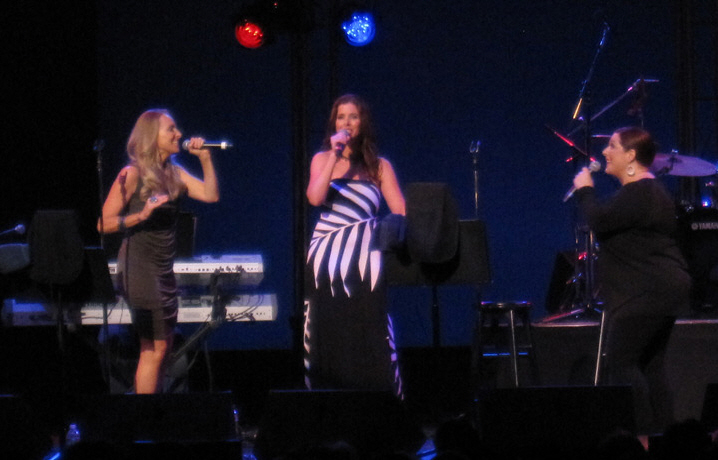
Wilson's daughters Carnie (right) and Wendy (center) performing with Chynna Phillips as Wilson Phillips in 2011.

Wilson and Marilyn were married in December 1964; much of the lyrical content from Pet Sounds reflected their early marital strains that later intensified. They had two daughters, Carnie and Wendy (born 1968 and 1969, respectively), who later had musical success as two-thirds of the group Wilson Phillips. His daughters inspired his songs "Roller Skating Child" (1977). "I Wanna Pick You Up" (1977), and "Little Children" (1988). Wilson later described himself as a neglectful father and husband during his first marriage. He had encouraged his wife to pursue extramarital affairs, including one with songwriter Tandyn Almer, while he engaged in an affair with her sister, the subject of his song "My Diane" (1978). Concurrently, Wilson maintained an affair with a fan, Debbie Keil, who inspired his song "The Night Was So Young" (1977). (Note: Keil later provided many anonymous quotations for David Leaf's 1978 biography The Beach Boys and the California Myth. Gaines describes Keil as a Beach Boys fan who had moved from Kansas to Los Angeles when she was 19 with the purpose of getting close to Wilson. Writing in his 2022 revision of California Myth, Leaf explained, "Debbie never tried to shape the narrative. I felt her observations were insightful, very different from what I'd been reading.")

In July 1978, Wilson and Marilyn separated, and he filed for divorce in January 1979. Marilyn received custody of their children and a half share of Wilson's songwriting royalties. Wilson continued his relationship with Keil until 1981. After the separation, Wilson dated one of his nurses, Carolyn Williams, until January 1983. (Note: During that period, Williams had claimed that Wilson was being held captive by Landy. In response, Wilson held a press conference to announce that he was disassociating himself from her. Carlin described Williams as generally considered to be "a sweet, well-intentioned woman", while Wilson, via his 2016 memoir, attributed their split "mostly because of me", citing an incident in which he berated Williams, a black woman, with a racist remark.) Singer Linda Ronstadt, in her 2013 memoir Simple Dreams, implied that she had briefly dated Wilson in the 1970s.

Wilson initially dated Melinda Kae Ledbetter from 1986 to late 1989. Ledbetter attributed the premature end of their relationship to interference by Landy. After 1991, he and Ledbetter reconnected and married on February 6, 1995, (Note: Wilson chose the date because it was Marilyn's birthday, and thus easy to remember for future anniversaries. Marilyn attended the wedding.) after which she became his manager. Some reports suggested that those close to him, including Ledbetter, had exploited him into maintaining an active touring and recording career, and debate persisted among fans over whether he fully consented to his semi-regular touring schedule through the 2010s. (Note: Carnie nicknamed Ledbetter "Melandy", while family friend Ginger Blake described Wilson as "complacent and basically surrendered". Mike Love stated his willingness to reunite the Beach Boys with Wilson but remarked that "Brian usually has someone in his life who tells him what to do. And now that person kinda wants to keep him away from us. I don't know why. You'd have to ask her, I guess.") In 2011 interviews, Jeff Foskett rejected such claims, while Van Dyke Parks stated that Wilson's "life turned into a better place" after marrying Ledbetter. (Note: Although Wilson often stated that he enjoyed live performances, Jon Stebbins argued in his 2011 biography that his handlers, managers, and wife had compelled him to work. Stebbins cited an interview in which, after Wilson admitted disliking touring, his handler promptly reminded him that he loved performing. In a 2016 Rolling Stone interview, Wilson responded to a retirement question by stating he would rather continue touring than sit idle.) The couple adopted five children. By 2012, Wilson had six grandchildren, two daughters of Carnie and four sons of Wendy. Upon Melinda's death, Wilson's social media declared she "was my savior. She gave me the emotional security I needed to have a career. She encouraged me to make the music that was closer to my heart".

=== Spirituality ===
Wilson was raised in a Presbyterian family. In many interviews, he emphasized the spiritual essence of his music, particularly with Pet Sounds. He was also intrigued by astrology, numerology, and the occult, as reflected in his original concepts for Smile. In 1966, Wilson expressed his belief that all music "starts with religion", and while he recognized a "higher being who is better than we are", he was not traditionally religious.

In the late 1960s, Wilson and his bandmates promoted Transcendental Meditation (TM). By 1968, he had equated religion and meditation, though he ultimately abandoned TM. He described himself in 1976 as having over-diversified his readings, maintaining then that he still believed that the coming of "the great Messiah [...] came in the form of drugs" while acknowledging that his own drug experiences "really didn't work out so well". (Note: Asked whether his music was religiously influenced in 1988, he referred to the 1962 book A Toehold on Zen, explaining that he believed that he possessed what is called a "toehold", meaning that having "a good grasp" on one aspect of life can translate to others.)

In 2011, he said that while he had spiritual beliefs, he did not follow any particular religion. Asked in 2004 for his favorite book, Wilson answered "the Bible", and questioned if he believed in life after death, Wilson replied "I don't".

=== Interviews and memoirs ===
He is an artist wrapped densely in myth and enigma who, in person, in interview, creates as many questions as he answers.

— Journalist Verlyn Klinkenborg, 1988

Wilson admitted to having a poor memory and occasionally lying in interviews to "test" people. His first memoir, Wouldn't It Be Nice: My Own Story, was written with journalist Todd Gold and published in October 1991. Landy was a close partner in the writing and production process. It was subsequently discredited by Wilson's biographers, including Peter Ames Carlin, who writes that the book had plagiarized excerpts from earlier biographies. The memoir prompted defamation lawsuits from Mike Love and Al Jardine, as well as his brother Carl and their mother Audree.

In later years, many writers found Wilson challenging to interview, as his responses were usually curt or lacking in substance, and he often ended interviews abruptly. (Note: David Oppenheim, recalling his 1966 interview with Wilson, remembered, "we tried to talk with him but didn't get much out of him. Some guy said 'He's not verbal.'" Westword contributor Michael Roberts wrote in 2000 that Wilson's "public statements over time have tended to reiterate those of whoever's supervising his activities at the moment". Edgers wrote in 2000 that "no writer will ever understand Brian Wilson", highlighting his often "clipped and conflicting" responses, adding that he "generally makes it clear to interviewers that he would rather be somewhere else – and that's when he's feeling good".) A second memoir, I Am Brian Wilson, written by journalist Ben Greenman after several months of interviews, followed in October 2015. Asked about negative remarks in the book, Love rejected Wilson as its author and argued that he was "not in charge of his life, like I am mine". (Note: The Charlotte Observer's Theoden Janes surmised in 2017 that despite Wilson's widely documented past struggles with mental illness, he appeared to be actively involved in major projects like his second memoir and a concert tour, indicating he could choose to decline interviews if he wished. During the late-2010s filming of Long Promised Road, Wilson remarked to a journalist that he had not "had a friend to talk to in three years".)

== Cultural impact and influence ==
=== Popular music and record production ===
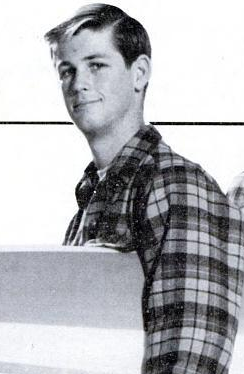
Wilson at a Beach Boys photoshoot in 1962.

Wilson is widely regarded as one of the most innovative and important songwriters of the late 20th century and he was credited with writing or co-writing more than three dozen U.S. top 40 hits. From 1962 to 1979, he wrote or co-wrote twenty-four U.S. top 40 hits for the Beach Boys, with eleven reaching the top 10, including the number-ones "I Get Around", "Help Me, Rhonda", and "Good Vibrations". (Note: The remaining eight top 10 hits were: 1963's "Surfin' U.S.A." (number 3), "Surfer Girl" (number 7), and "Be True to Your School" (number 6); 1964's "Fun, Fun, Fun" (number 5), "When I Grow Up (To Be a Man)" (number 9), and "Dance, Dance, Dance" (number 8); 1965's "California Girls" (number 3); 1966's "Wouldn't It Be Nice" (number 8).; Three more that he produced, but did not write, were the band's "Barbara Ann" (number 2) in 1965, "Sloop John B" (number 3) in 1966, and "Rock and Roll Music" (number 5) in 1976.) Among his other top 10 hits, he co-wrote Jan and Dean's "Surf City" (the first chart-topping surf song, 1963), "Drag City" (number 10, 1963) and "Dead Man's Curve" (number 8, 1964), and the Hondells' "Little Honda" (number 9, 1964).

The level of creative control that Wilson had asserted over his own record output was unprecedented in the music industry, leading him to become the first pop artist credited for writing, arranging, producing, and performing his own material. Wilson's autonomy encompassed control over recording studios and personnel, including engineers and the typically intrusive A&R representative. According to biographer James Murphy, Wilson's singular artistic freedom was pivotal in reshaping both the landscape of popular music and the music industry's perception of artistic control. In addition to being one of the first music producer auteurs, Wilson helped popularize the idea of the recording studio as a compositional tool, and he was the first rock producer to use the studio in this fashion. Granata writes that Wilson "redefined" the role of the producer, and Peter Doggett identifies Wilson as the quintessential figure of an era marked by "some of the most notorious pop battles" between "idealistic musicians" and the executives funding their ambitious projects. (Note: Brian's brother Carl remarked, "Record companies were used to having absolute control over their artists. [...] But what could they say? Brian made good records.")

His accomplishments influenced many others in his field, effectively setting a precedent that allowed subsequent bands and artists to produce their own recording sessions. Following his exercise of total creative autonomy, he ignited an explosion of like-minded California producers, supplanting New York as the center of popular records. By 1966, he had overtaken Phil Spector's standing as a leading figure in the Los Angeles music scene; according to Hal Blaine, "Whereas Brian wanted [the Wrecking Crew] because of the Spector dates, everybody else now wanted us because of the Beach Boys dates." Wilson was also a pioneer of "project" recording, where an artist records in his own space rather than at an established studio.

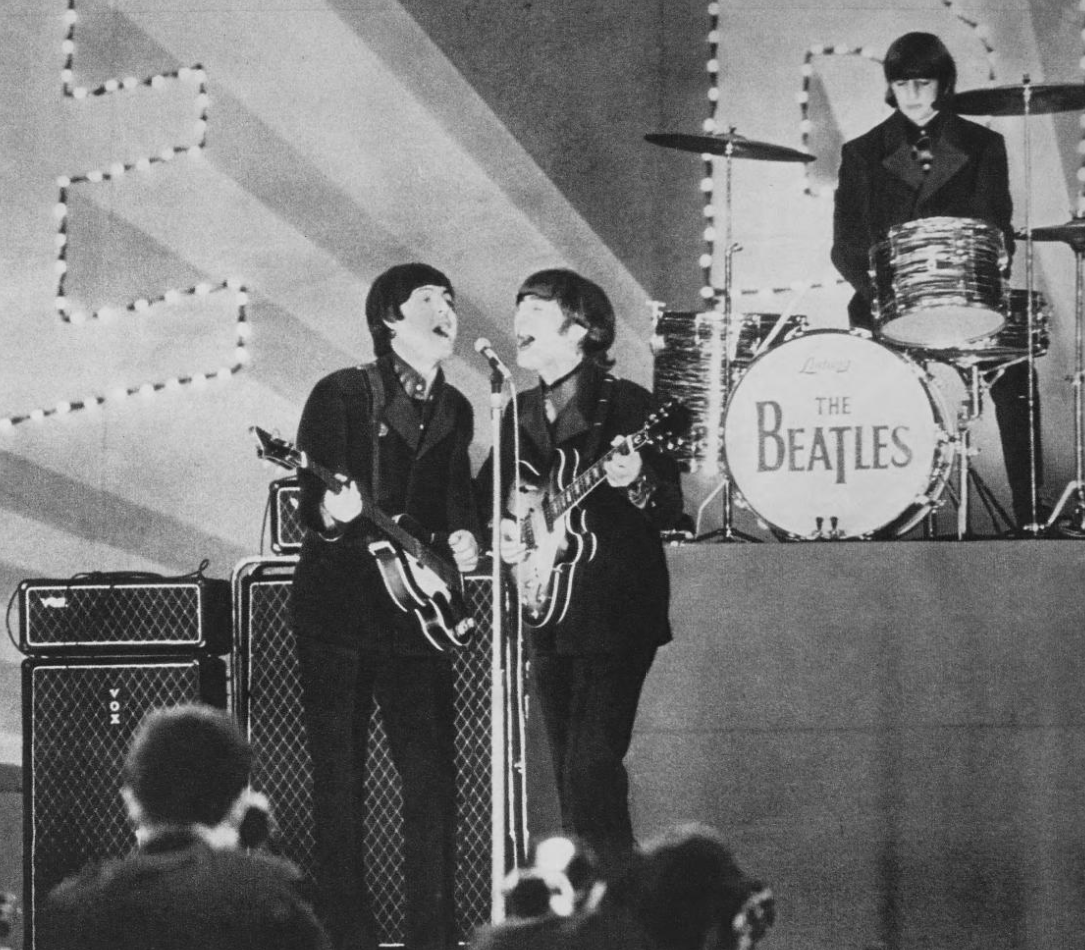
The Beatles (pictured) were engaged in a creative rivalry with Wilson during the mid-1960s.

Many of his peers considered him to be one of the most significant artists in popular music, and those who acknowledged his advancements included Philip Glass, Gustavo Dudamel, and Burt Bacharach, the latter of whom praised Wilson as "one of the greatest innovators" in music history. George Martin said, "No one made a greater impact on the Beatles than Brian [...] the musician who challenged them most of all." (Note: John Lennon, Paul McCartney, and George Harrison each championed Pet Sounds when it was released. Moreover, Harrison recalled that the group had felt threatened by the album. Asked in 1966 for the musical person he most admired, Lennon named Wilson.) Jimmy Webb explained, "As far as a major, modern producer who was working right in the middle of the pop milieu, no one was doing what Brian was doing. We didn't even know that it was possible until he did it." David Crosby called Wilson "the most highly regarded pop musician in America. Hands down." Elton John credited Wilson with revolutionizing bass technique for songwriters and keyboardists, being "the first" in popular music to write bass lines rooted in the third or fifth scale degree.

The 1967 CBS documentary Inside Pop: The Rock Revolution described Wilson as "one of today's most important pop musicians". Artists who have described Wilson as a "genius" have included George Martin, Leon Russell, Eric Clapton, Pete Townshend, Jimmy Page, Elton John, Tom Petty, Henry Rollins, and Questlove. Many other musicians have voiced admiration for Wilson's work or cited it as an influence, including Bob Dylan, Neil Young, Ray Davies, John Cale, David Byrne, Todd Rundgren, Patti Smith, Mick Jagger, Keith Richards, Bruce Springsteen, Randy Newman, Ray Charles, and Chrissie Hynde. In discussing Wilson's harmonic ingenuity, musicologist Philip Lambert stated in 2016 that his harmonic approach demonstrated an exceptional mastery and had left a lasting imprint on popular music since.

=== Art pop, psychedelia, and progressive music ===
There is no god and Brian Wilson is his son. Brian Wilson stirred up the chords.

— Velvet Underground co-founder Lou Reed, 1966

Brian Wilson was not imitative, he was inventive; for people who don't write songs, it's hard to understand how inventive he really was.

— Collaborator Van Dyke Parks, 2011

Further to his invention of new musical textures and his novel applications of quasi-symphonic orchestras, Wilson helped propel the mid-1960s art pop movement, and, with Pet Sounds, was immediately heralded as art rock's leading figure. Carlin writes that Wilson had originated an "art-rock" style that merged transcendent artistic possibilities with the mainstream appeal of pop music. Academic Larry Starr writes, "In a sense, Brian Wilson was the first self-conscious second-generation rock 'n' roller" as well as "the first fully realized" example of both an innovative and majorly successful pop musician, establishing a successful career model that was subsequently followed by the Beatles and other mid-1960s British Invasion acts. (Note: In Starr's estimation, Wilson had initially demonstrated a proficiency in the fundamental styles of early rock 'n' roll, both in ballads and faster-paced songs. He then developed and evolved these styles through original compositions, and, ultimately, diverged significantly from traditional rock 'n' roll forms, sounds, and themes to forge a distinctive musical identity.)

Under Wilson's creative leadership, the Beach Boys became major contributors to the development of psychedelic music, although they are rarely credited for this distinction. Christian Matijas-Mecca, in his book about psychedelic rock, credits Wilson, alongside Bob Dylan and the Beatles, for establishing a creative standard that "enabled psychedelic artists to expand their sonic and compositional boundaries", yielding "entirely new" sounds and tone colors. In an editorial piece on sunshine pop, The A.V. Club's Noel Murray recognized Wilson as among "studio rats [that] set the pace for how pop music could and should sound in the Flower Power era: at once starry-eyed and wistful". His work with the Beach Boys, especially on Pet Sounds, "Good Vibrations" and Smile, marked the beginnings of progressive pop, a genre distinguished by sophisticated and unorthodox approaches to pop music. Writing in 1978, biographer David Leaf identified Wilson's 1960s productions as a chief influence on bands such as Queen, Electric Light Orchestra, 10cc, and Crosby, Stills, Nash & Young, among others. (Note: Many of the 1970s and 1980s acts that Wilson influenced, including ELO, Sparks, Supertramp, Kate Bush, and Tears for Fears, came to be linked under the "progressive pop" banner.) Musicologist Bill Martin acknowledged Wilson's influence on progressive rock, particularly through his complex songwriting and basslines.

According to journalist Erik Davis, in addition to composing "a soundtrack to the early '60s", Wilson initiated "a delicate and joyful art pop unique in music history and presaged the mellowness so fundamental to '70s California pop". Parks stated that "Wilson made music as accessible as a cartoon and yet rewarded repeated listening as much as Bach", also suggesting that Wilson's sensibilities overlapped with those espoused by pop artists of the era. (Note: In a 1968 article for Jazz & Pop, contributor Gene Sculatti addressed popular criticisms regarding the Beach Boys openly embracing mass culture and commercialism; Sculatti argued that these associations were artistically validated by Wilson's authentic "fascination with popular culture", a preoccupation that had "served Warhol and Chuck Berry equally well". Pop artist Peter Blake, who designed the Beatles' Sgt. Pepper album cover, said, "I've never been an enormous fan of the Beatles like I am of the Beach Boys.") Writing in 2016, The Atlantic's Jason Guriel argued that Wilson's detachment from live performance presaged later producer-musicians like Max Martin; Guriel also credited his work on Pet Sounds with inventing "the modern pop album" and anticipating "the rise of the producer [and] the modern pop-centric era, which privileges producer over artist and blurs the line between entertainment and art". (Note: Guriel goes on to note, "In a move that would've pleased Andy Warhol, Wilson recruited an advertising copywriter to come up with the album's lyrics. In a move that would've pleased a Dadaist, he rattled listeners' sense of sonic possibility.")

=== Rock/pop division, alternative music, and continued cultural resonance ===
Wilson's popularity and success is attributed partly to the perceived naïveté of his work and personality. Commenting on the seemingly "campy and corny" quality of the Beach Boys' first records, David Marks said that Wilson had been "dead serious about them all", elaborating, "It's hard to believe that anyone could be that naive and honest, but he was. That's what made those records so successful. You could feel the sincerity in them." In music journalist Barney Hoskyns's description, the "particular appeal of Wilson's genius" can be traced to his "singular naivety" and "ingenuousness", alongside his band being "the very obverse of hip".

"I guess I just wasn't made for these times," he had declared on Pet Sounds, and the song had become the overture for a decades-long saga that would be, in its way, just as influential as Pet Sounds had been. [...] Ultimately, Brian's public suffering had transformed him from a musical figure into a cultural one.

— Biographer Peter Ames Carlin

The most culturally significant "tragedy" in 1960s rock, according to journalist Richard Goldstein, was Wilson's failure to overcome his insecurities and realize "his full potential as a composer" after having anticipated developments such as electronica and minimalism. Writing in 1981, sociomusicologist Simon Frith identified Wilson's withdrawal in 1967, along with Phil Spector's self-imposed retirement in 1966, as the catalysts for the "rock/pop split that has afflicted American music ever since". (Note: Speaking in a 1997 interview, musician Sean O'Hagan felt that rock music's domination of mass culture following the mid-1960s had the effect of artistically stifling contemporary pop composers who, until then, had been guided by Wilson's increasingly ambitious creative advancements.) By the mid-1970s, Wilson had tied with ex–Pink Floyd member Syd Barrett for rock music's foremost "mythical casualty". Timothy White wrote that Wilson's ensuing legend rivaled that of the California myth promoted by the Beach Boys, while Brackett characterized Wilson's "rise and fall and rise" as a "downright Shakespearean" story. (Note: Hoskyns identified Wilson's retreat as "central to the obsession many people have with his lost greatness".) Ultimately, he became regarded as the most famous outsider musician. (Note: Author Irwin Chusid, who codified the term "outsider music", noted Wilson as a potentially unconvincing example of the genre due to Wilson's commercial successes, but argued that the musician should be considered an outsider due to his "tormented" background, past issues with drug dependencies, and unorthodox songwriting.) His personal and creative struggles have also contributed to portrayals of Wilson in popular commentary as a "tortured artist" archetype.

Wilson has been declared the "godfather" of punk, indie rock, and emo. Principally through his early collaborations with Mike Love, Wilson was a key influence on the development of punk rock and the movement's evolution into indie rock. According to critic Carl Wilson (no relation to the Beach Boys' Carl Wilson), punk bands like the Ramones "seized on and subverted the early Wilson template"; additionally, Wilson's "vulnerability", "offbeat instruments", and "intricate harmonies", together with the Smile mythos, served as a "touchstone" for art-inclined post-punk and bands such as Pere Ubu, XTC, U2, R.E.M., the Pixies, and My Bloody Valentine. In her article which dubbed him "the godfather of sensitive pop", music journalist Patricia Cárdenas credits Wilson with ultimately inspiring many musicians to value the craft of pop songwriting as much as "the primal, hard-driving rock 'n' roll the world had come to know since then". Author Nathan Wiseman-Trowse credits Wilson, alongside Spector, with having "arguably pioneered", in popular music, the "approach to the sheer physicality of sound", an integral characteristic of the dream pop genre. Other acts who were influenced by Wilson, or that voiced their admiration, included Robyn Hitchcock, Redd Kross, the Church, Rain Parade, Big Dipper, the Go-Betweens, Psychic TV, the Feelies, and the dBs.

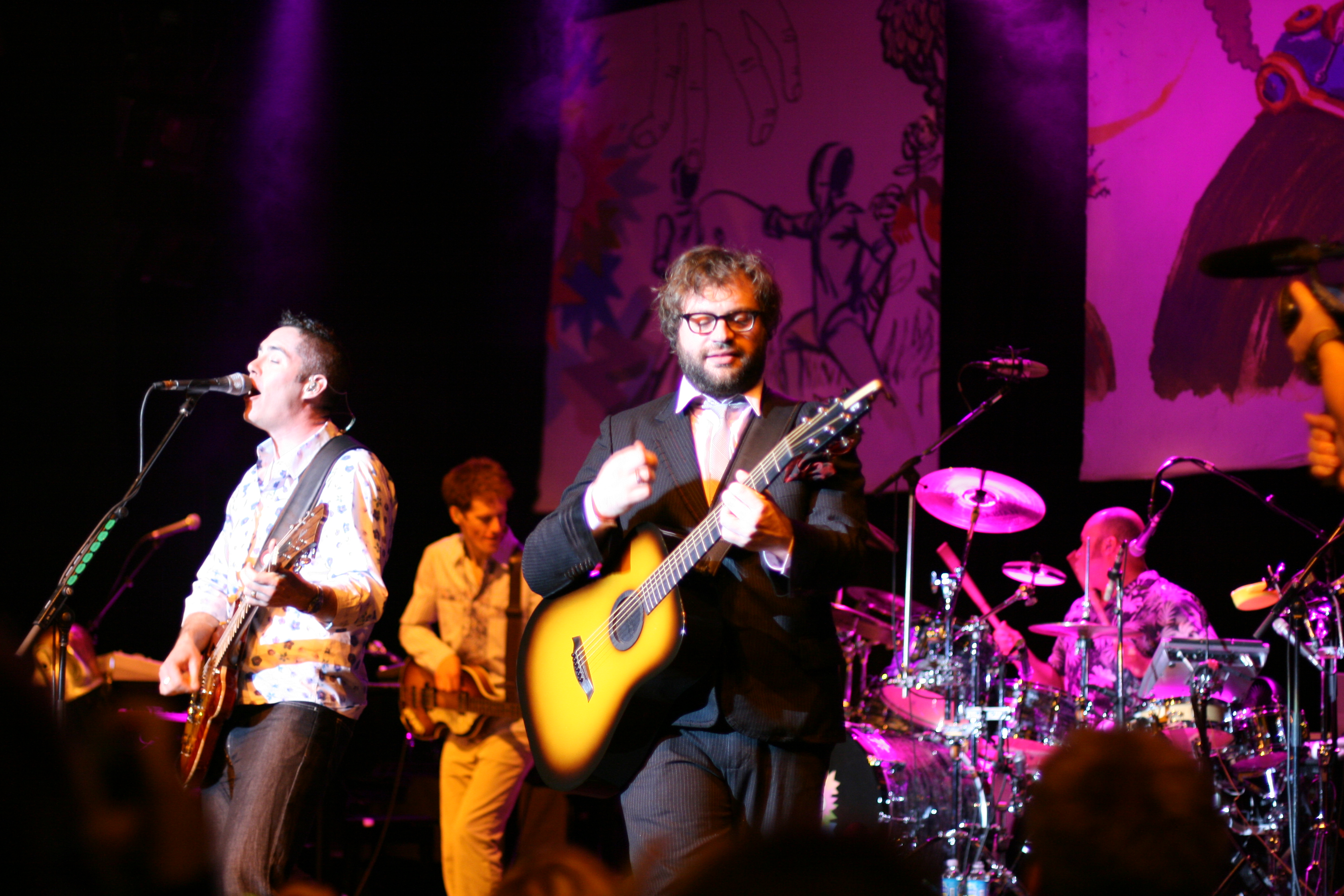
Barenaked Ladies enjoyed a top 40 hit with their tribute song, "Brian Wilson", in 1998. Wilson himself performed the song at his concerts, showcased on Live at the Roxy.

He was also credited with "godfathering" an era of independently produced music that was heavily indebted to his melodic sensibilities, chamber-pop orchestrations, and recording experiments. Many of the most popular acts of the 1980s and 1990s recorded songs that celebrated or referenced Wilson's music, including R.E.M., Bruce Springsteen, Barenaked Ladies, the Jayhawks, and Wilco. Simultaneously, the High Llamas inspired many American touring groups, especially around Los Angeles, to recognize Wilson as an "alternative music hero". Stereolab and the Elephant 6 collective, whose roster included Apples in Stereo, of Montreal and the Olivia Tremor Control, were all heavily influenced by Wilson. In Japan, references to Wilson and his "mad boy genius" legend became a common trope among Shibuya-kei (渋谷系) musicians such as Cornelius. In 2000, Marina Records released Caroline Now!, an album of Wilson's songs recorded by artists including Alex Chilton, Kim Fowley, the Aluminum Group, Eric Matthews, Saint Etienne, Peter Thomas, the High Llamas, and Jad Fair of Half Japanese.

Through acts such as Panda Bear, and especially his 2007 album Person Pitch, Wilson began to be recognized for his continued impact on the indie music vanguard. In 2009, Pitchfork ran an editorial feature that traced the development of nascent indie music scenes, and chillwave in particular, to the themes of Wilson's songs and his reputation for being an "emotionally fragile dude with mental health problems who coped by taking drugs". By 2021, his influence continued to be attributed to contemporary dream pop acts such as Au Revoir Simone, Wild Nothing, Alvvays, and Lana Del Rey. In 2022, She & Him, accompanied by the release of Melt Away: A Tribute to Brian Wilson, embarked on a concert tour dedicated to renditions of Wilson's songs.

== Authorized documentary films ==
- Brian Wilson: I Just Wasn't Made for These Times, directed by Don Was, premiered at the Sundance Film Festival in January 1995. It features new interviews with Wilson and many other musicians, including Linda Ronstadt and Sonic Youth's Thurston Moore, who discuss Wilson's life and his music achievements.
- Beautiful Dreamer: Brian Wilson and the Story of Smile, directed by David Leaf, premiered on the Showtime network in October 2004. It includes interviews with Wilson and dozens of his associates, albeit none of his surviving bandmates from the Beach Boys, who declined to appear in the film.
- Brian Wilson: Long Promised Road, directed by Brent Wilson (no relation), premiered at the Tribeca Film Festival in June 2021. It is focused on the previous two decades of Wilson's life, with appearances from Bruce Springsteen, Elton John, Jim James, Nick Jonas, Taylor Hawkins, Don Was, and Jakob Dylan.

== Accolades ==
=== Awards and honors ===
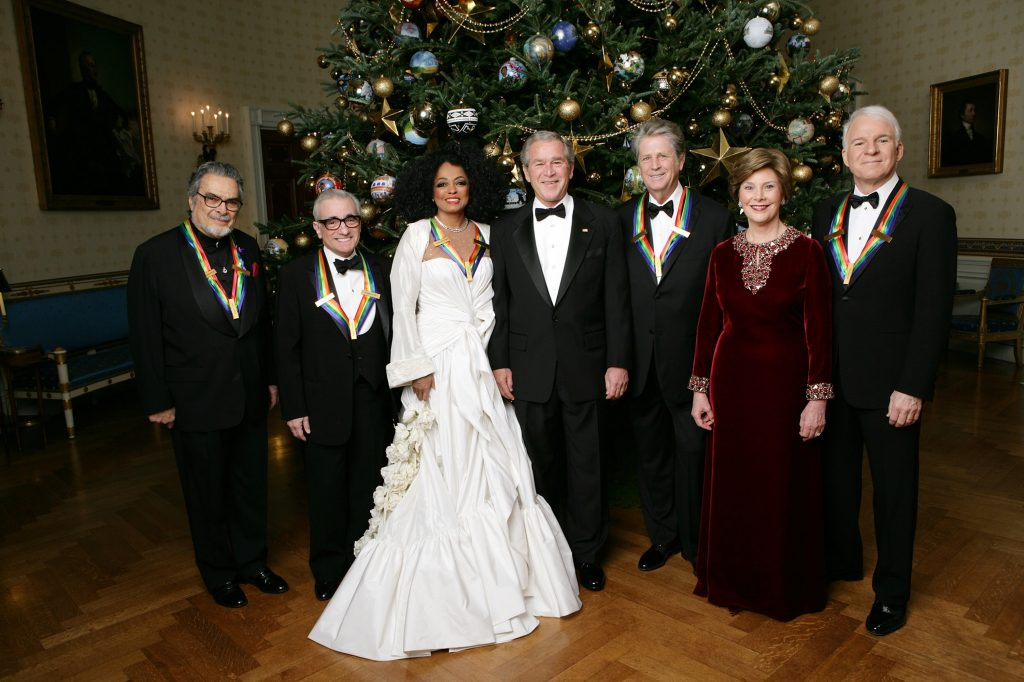
At the Kennedy Center, 2007. (From l. to r.) Leon Fleisher, Martin Scorsese, Diana Ross, President George W. Bush, Wilson, Laura Bush, Steve Martin.

- Nine-time Grammy Award nominee, two-time winner.

Organizations	Year	Award	Result	Ref.
Grammy Awards	2005	Best Rock Instrumental Performance for "Mrs. O'Leary's Cow"	Won	
Grammy Awards	2013	Best Historical Album for The Smile Sessions	Won	
Hollywood Walk of Fame	1980	As a member of the Beach Boys	Honored	
Rock and Roll Hall of Fame	1988	As a member of the Beach Boys	Honored	
Primetime Emmy Award	1996	Outstanding Cultural Music-Dance Program for Brian Wilson: I Just Wasn't Made For These Times	Nominated	
Songwriters Hall of Fame	2000	inducted by Paul McCartney (Note: who referred to him as "one of the great American geniuses")	Honored	
Ivor Novello International Award	2003	For his contributions to popular music	Honored	
Northeastern University	2003	Honorary doctorate of music	Honored	
Broadcast Music Incorporated	2004	BMI Icon Awards (Note: being saluted for his "unique and indelible influence on generations of music makers.")	Honored	
MusiCares Person of the Year	2005	for his artistic and philanthropic accomplishments	Honored	
UK Music Hall of Fame	2006	Inducted by Pink Floyd guitarist David Gilmour	Honored	
Hollywood Bowl Hall of Fame	2007	Induction	Honored	
Kennedy Center Honors	2007	Medal (Note: committee recognized Wilson for a lifetime of contributions to American culture through the performing arts in music)	Honored	
American Academy of Achievement	2008	Golden Plate Award	Honored	
UCLA	2011	George and Ira Gershwin Award at UCLA Spring Sing	Honored	
Golden Globe Award	2015	Best Original Song for "One Kind of Love" from Love & Mercy	Nominated	

=== Polls and critics' rankings ===
Organizations	Year	Notes	Ref.
NME	1966	Wilson was ranked number four in "World Music Personality" reader's poll. (Note: about 1,000 votes ahead of Bob Dylan and 500 behind John Lennon)	
Rolling Stone	2008	Wilson was ranked number 52 in list of the "100 Greatest Singers of All Time". (Note: He was described in his entry as "the ultimate singer's songwriter" of the mid-1960s.)	
NME	2012	Wilson was ranked number eight in list of the "50 Greatest Producers Ever". (Note: elaborating "few consider quite how groundbreaking Brian Wilson's studio techniques were in the mid-60s".)	
Rolling Stone	2015	Wilson was ranked number 12 in the list of the "100 Greatest Songwriters of All Time".	
Rolling Stone	2020	Brian Wilson Presents Smile was ranked number 399 on the list of "The 500 Greatest Albums of All Time".	
Ultimate Classic Rock	2022	Wilson was ranked second in the list of the best producers in rock history.	
Rolling Stone	2023	Wilson was ranked number 57 in the list of the "200 Greatest Singers of All Time". (Note: elaborating that "he is so renowned for his producing and songwriting skills that his gifts as a vocalist are often overlooked".)	

== Discography ==
- Brian Wilson (1988)
- Sweet Insanity (1990) (unofficial)
- I Just Wasn't Made for These Times (1995) (soundtrack)
- Orange Crate Art (1995) (with Van Dyke Parks)
- Imagination (1998)
- Gettin' In over My Head (2004)
- Brian Wilson Presents Smile (2004)
- What I Really Want for Christmas (2005)
- That Lucky Old Sun (2008)
- Brian Wilson Reimagines Gershwin (2010)
- In the Key of Disney (2011)
- No Pier Pressure (2015)
- At My Piano (2021)
- Brian Wilson: Long Promised Road (2021) (soundtrack)

== Filmography ==
Year	Title	Role	Notes	Ref
Film
1965	The Girls on the Beach	himself (with the Beach Boys)	Beach comedy film	
1965	The Monkey's Uncle	himself (with the Beach Boys)	Beach comedy film	
1987	The Return of Bruno	himself	Mockumentary film	
1994	Theremin: An Electronic Odyssey	himself	Documentary	
1995	Brian Wilson: I Just Wasn't Made for These Times	himself	Documentary	
2004	Beautiful Dreamer: Brian Wilson and the Story of Smile	himself	Documentary	
2006	Tales of the Rat Fink	The Surfite (voice)		
2018	Echo in the Canyon	himself	Documentary	
2021	Brian Wilson: Long Promised Road	himself	Documentary	
2024	The Beach Boys	himself	Documentary	
Television
1967	Inside Pop: The Rock Revolution	himself	Television movie	
1988	The New Leave It to Beaver	Mr. Hawthorne	Episode: "Day Dreamin'"	
1988	Full House	himself (with the Beach Boys)	Episode: "Beach Boy Bingo"	
1995	Baywatch	himself (with the Beach Boys)	Episode: "Surf's Up"	
2005	Duck Dodgers	himself (voice)	Episode: "Surf the Stars"	

== See also ==
- List of people with absolute pitch
- List of people with bipolar disorder
- List of recluses
- List of unreleased songs recorded by the Beach Boys
- Pet Projects: The Brian Wilson Productions
- Playback: The Brian Wilson Anthology

== Bibliography ==
- Badman, Keith (2004). The Beach Boys: The Definitive Diary of America's Greatest Band, on Stage and in the Studio. Backbeat Books. ISBN 978-0-87930-818-6.
- Barrow, Tony; Bextor, Robin (2004). Paul McCartney: Now and Then. Hal Leonard Corporation. ISBN 978-0-634-06919-2.
- Brackett, Donald (2008). "The Dream Teller: Brian Wilson". Dark Mirror: The Pathology of the Singer-Songwriter. Westport, Connecticut: Praeger. pp. 27–39. ISBN 9780275998981.
- Brown, Mick (2007) [2006]. Tearing Down the Wall of Sound: The Rise and Fall of Phil Spector. London: Bloomsbury. ISBN 978-1-4000-4219-7.
- Carlin, Peter Ames (2006). Catch a Wave: The Rise, Fall, and Redemption of the Beach Boys' Brian Wilson. Rodale. ISBN 978-1-59486-320-2.
- Chusid, Irwin (2000). Songs in the Key of Z: The Curious Universe of Outsider Music. Chicago Review Press. ISBN 978-1-55652-372-4.
- Cogan, Jim; Clark, William (2003). Temples of Sound: Inside the Great Recording Studios. Chronicle Books. ISBN 978-0-8118-3394-3.
- Cohn, Nik (1970). Awopbopaloobop Alopbamboom: The Golden Age of Rock. Grove Press. ISBN 978-0-8021-3830-9.
- Dillon, Mark (2012). Fifty Sides of the Beach Boys: The Songs That Tell Their Story. ECW Press. ISBN 978-1-77090-198-8.
- Doggett, Peter (2016). Electric Shock: From the Gramophone to the iPhone: 125 years of Pop Music. London: Vintage. ISBN 9780099575191.
- Edmondson, Jacqueline, ed. (2013). Music in American Life: An Encyclopedia of the Songs, Styles, Stars, and Stories that Shaped our Culture. ABC-CLIO. ISBN 978-0-313-39348-8.
- Gaines, Steven (1986). Heroes and Villains: The True Story of The Beach Boys. New York: Da Capo Press. ISBN 0306806479.
- Granata, Charles L. (2003). Wouldn't It Be Nice: Brian Wilson and the Making of the Beach Boys' Pet Sounds. A Cappella Books. ISBN 9781556525070.
- Holdship, Bill (1997) [1991]. "Bittersweet Insanity: The Fight for Brian Wilson's Soul". In Abbott, Kingsley (ed.). Back to the Beach: A Brian Wilson and the Beach Boys Reader (1st ed.). London: Helter Skelter. pp. 205–212. ISBN 978-1-900924-02-3.
- Highwater, Jamake (1968). Rock and Other Four Letter Words: Music of the Electric Generation. Bantam Books. ISBN 0-552-04334-6.
- Hoskyns, Barney (2009). Waiting for the Sun: A Rock 'n' Roll History of Los Angeles. Backbeat Books. ISBN 978-0-87930-943-5.
- Howard, David N. (2004). Sonic Alchemy: Visionary Music Producers and Their Maverick Recordings (1 ed.). Milwaukee, Wisconsin: Hal Leonard. ISBN 978-0-63405-560-7.
- Jackson, Andrew Grant (2015). 1965: The Most Revolutionary Year in Music. St. Martin's Publishing Group. ISBN 978-1-4668-6497-9.
- Jones, Carys Wyn (2008). The Rock Canon: Canonical Values in the Reception of Rock Albums. Ashgate Publishing, Ltd. ISBN 978-0-7546-6244-0.
- Kent, Nick (2009). "The Last Beach Movie Revisited: The Life of Brian Wilson". The Dark Stuff: Selected Writings on Rock Music. Da Capo Press. ISBN 9780786730742.
- Lambert, Philip (2007). Inside the Music of Brian Wilson: the Songs, Sounds, and Influences of the Beach Boys' Founding Genius. Continuum. ISBN 978-0-8264-1876-0.
- Lambert, Philip (2016). "Brian Wilson's Harmonic Language". In Lambert, Philip (ed.). Good Vibrations: Brian Wilson and the Beach Boys in Critical Perspective. University of Michigan Press. ISBN 978-0-472-11995-0. Archived from the original on December 14, 2022.
- Leaf, David (1978). The Beach Boys and the California Myth. New York: Grosset & Dunlap. ISBN 978-0-448-14626-3.
- Leaf, David (2022). God Only Knows: The Story of Brian Wilson, the Beach Boys and the California Myth (3rd ed.). Omnibus Press. ISBN 9781913172756.
- Leaf, David (2025). SMiLE: The Rise, Fall, and Resurrection of Brian Wilson. Omnibus Press. ISBN 978-1-915841-31-5.
- Love, Mike (2016). Good Vibrations: My Life as a Beach Boy. Penguin Publishing Group. ISBN 978-0-698-40886-9.
- MacLeod, Sean (2017). Phil Spector: Sound of the Sixties. Rowman & Littlefield Publishers. ISBN 978-1-4422-6706-0.
- Martin, Bill (2015). Avant Rock: Experimental Music from the Beatles to Bjork. Open Court Publishing Company. ISBN 978-0-8126-9939-5.
- Massey, Howard (2000). Behind the Glass: Top Record Producers Tell How They Craft the Hits. San Francisco: Miller Freeman Books. ISBN 978-0-87930-614-4.
- Matijas-Mecca, Christian (2017). The Words and Music of Brian Wilson. ABC-CLIO. ISBN 978-1-4408-3899-6.
- Matijas-Mecca, Christian (2020). Listen to Psychedelic Rock! Exploring a Musical Genre. ABC-CLIO. ISBN 9781440861987.
- Moorefield, Virgil (2010). The Producer as Composer: Shaping the Sounds of Popular Music. MIT Press. ISBN 978-0-262-51405-7.
- Murphy, James B. (2015). Becoming the Beach Boys, 1961-1963. McFarland. ISBN 978-0-7864-7365-6.
- Sanchez, Luis (2014). The Beach Boys' Smile. Bloomsbury Publishing. ISBN 978-1-62356-956-3.
- Toop, David (1999). Exotica: Fabricated Soundscapes in a Real World: Fabricated Soundscapes in the Real World (1st ed.). London: Serpent's Tail. ISBN 978-1852425951.
- Perone, James E. (2012). The Album: A Guide to Pop Music's Most Provocative, Influential, and Important Creations. ABC-CLIO. ISBN 978-0-313-37907-9.
- Perone, James E. (2015). "The Beach Boys". In Moskowitz, David V. (ed.). The 100 Greatest Bands of All Time: A Guide to the Legends Who Rocked the World. ABC-CLIO. ISBN 978-1-4408-0340-6.
- Priore, Domenic (2005). Smile: The Story of Brian Wilson's Lost Masterpiece. London: Sanctuary. ISBN 1860746276.
- Starr, Larry (2007) [first published in 2006]. American Popular Music: From Minstrelsy to MP3 (2nd ed.). New York: Oxford University Press. ISBN 9780195300536.
- Stebbins, Jon (2000). Dennis Wilson: The Real Beach Boy. ECW Press. ISBN 978-1-55022-404-7.
- Stebbins, Jon (2011). The Beach Boys FAQ: All That's Left to Know About America's Band. Backbeat Books. ISBN 9781458429148.
- Thompson, Dave (2004). Wall of Pain: The Biography of Phil Spector (Paperback ed.). London: Sanctuary. ISBN 978-1-86074-543-0.
- White, Timothy (1996). The Nearest Faraway Place: Brian Wilson, the Beach Boys, and the Southern Californian Experience. Macmillan. ISBN 0333649370.
- Wilson, Brian; Gold, Todd (1991). Wouldn't It Be Nice: My Own Story. New York: HarperCollins. ISBN 978-0-06018-313-4.
- Wilson, Brian; Greenman, Ben (2016). I Am Brian Wilson: A Memoir. Da Capo Press. ISBN 978-0-306-82307-7.
