= We Gotta Groove: The Brother Studio Years =

Compilation album by the Beach Boys
- Released: February 13, 2026
- Recorded: 1974–1977
- Studio: Brother Studios (California)
- Genre: Rock; pop
- Label: Capitol
- Producer: James Sáez, Howie Edelson

The Beach Boys chronology
The Beach Boys: Music From The Documentary (2024)	We Gotta Groove: The Brother Studio Years (2026)

We Gotta Groove: The Brother Studio Years is an expanded reissue of the 1977 album Love You by American rock band the Beach Boys, released by Capitol Records on February 13, 2026. The set is dedicated largely to the group's recordings at Brother Studios from 1976 and 1977, a period that saw Brian Wilson return as their chief songwriter, producer, and vocalist. It contains 35 formerly unreleased tracks, including demos, alternate mixes, and outtakes from the recording of Love You, alongside additional selections drawn from the 15 Big Ones and Adult/Child sessions.

== Background and release ==
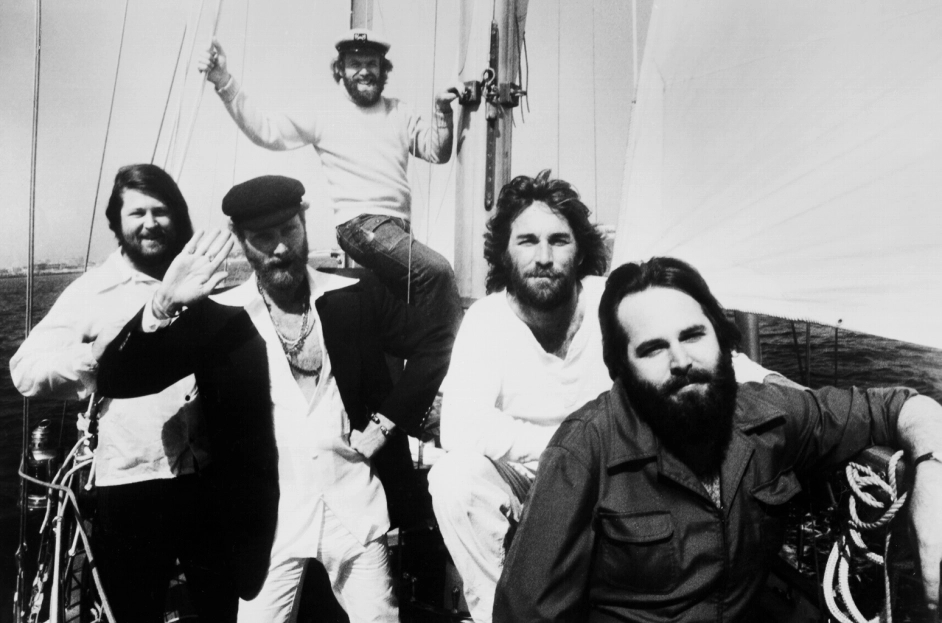
The Beach Boys in a publicity shot from 1976

In May 2025, Al Jardine announced an upcoming box set reissue of 15 Big Ones, The Beach Boys Love You, and M.I.U. Album, which would include the first official release of Adult/Child. That summer, he performed most of Love You on tour with a reformed version of Wilson's band following Wilson's death in June.

The set was officially announced on January 20, 2026 with a release date of February 13. It was made available on vinyl and CD, featuring a remastered version of The Beach Boys Love You along with outtakes, demos and alternate mixes from the album sessions. The outtakes were exclusive to the CD version.

The Adult/Child Sessions portion of the set omitted "Hey Little Tomboy" and "My Diane", both songs originally released on M.I.U. Album, as well as the early-1970s recordings "H.E.L.P. Is On the Way" and "Games Two Can Play". The latter two were previously included on Feel Flows (2021) and the 1993 box set Good Vibrations: Thirty Years of the Beach Boys, respectively.

== Reception ==
Professional ratings
Aggregate scores
Source	Rating
Metacritic	80/100
Review scores
Source	Rating
AllMusic	4/5 stars
The Guardian	3/5 stars
Mojo	5/5 stars
Pitchfork	7.7/10
Uncut	4/5 stars

At Metacritic, which assigns a normalized rating out of 100 to reviews from critics, We Gotta Groove: The Brother Studio Years received an average score of 80 based on five reviews, indicating "generally favorable reviews".

== Track listing ==
=== Disc one ===
All music is composed by Brian Wilson, except where indicated.

The Beach Boys Love You (1977 mix)
No.	Title	Writer(s)	Length
1.	"Let Us Go On This Way"	Brian Wilson, Mike Love	1:58
2.	"Roller Skating Child"		2:17
3.	"Mona"		2:06
4.	"Johnny Carson"		2:47
5.	"Good Time"	B. Wilson, Al Jardine	2:50
6.	"Honkin' Down the Highway"		2:48
7.	"Ding Dang"	B. Wilson, Roger McGuinn	0:57
8.	"Solar System"		2:49
9.	"The Night Was So Young"		2:15
10.	"I'll Bet He's Nice"		2:36
11.	"Let's Put Our Hearts Together"		2:14
12.	"I Wanna Pick You Up"		2:39
13.	"Airplane"		3:05
14.	"Love Is a Woman"		2:57

The Beach Boys Love You outtakes
No.	Title	Writer(s)	Length
15.	"Ruby Baby"	Jerry Leiber, Mike Stoller	2:24
16.	"Marilyn Rovell"		1:54
17.	"Sherry She Needs Me"	B. Wilson, Russ Titelman	2:43
18.	"Lazy Lizzie"		4:00
19.	"We Gotta Groove" (2025 mix)		2:09
20.	"Hey There Mama" (2025 mix)		2:33
21.	"Clangin'" (2025 mix)		0:50
22.	"Love Is a Woman" (Al Jardine vocal)		2:56
23.	"Johnny Carson" (alternate mix with intro)		3:00
24.	"You've Lost That Lovin' Feeling"	Barry Mann, Cynthia Weil, Phil Spector	3:50

=== Disc two ===
Adult/Child Sessions
No.	Title	Writer(s)	Length
1.	"Life Is for the Living"		1:53
2.	"Deep Purple"	Peter DeRose, Mitchell Parish	2:26
3.	"It's Over Now"		2:42
4.	"Still I Dream of It"		3:26
5.	"Everybody Wants to Live"		3:07
6.	"Lines"		1:46
7.	"It's Trying to Say"		2:08
8.	"Shortenin' Bread"	Traditional, arr. B. Wilson	2:50
9.	"New England Waltz"		2:40
10.	"Life Is for the Living" (2025 backing track mix)		1:55
11.	"Deep Purple" (2025 backing track mix)	DeRose, Parish	2:59
12.	"It's Over Now" (2025 backing track mix)		3:16
13.	"Still I Dream of It" (2025 backing track mix)		3:37

1974–1977 select outtakes
No.	Title	Writer(s)	Length
14.	"Holy Man" (2025 mix; Carl Wilson vocal)	Dennis Wilson	4:10
15.	"Carl's Song 1 (It Could Be Anything)" (2025 mix)	Carl Wilson	3:27
16.	"Carl's Song 2 (Angel Come Home)" (2025 mix)	C. Wilson, Geoffrey Cushing-Murray	3:41
17.	"String Bass Song (Rainbows)" (2025 mix)	D. Wilson, C. Wilson, Stephen Kalinich	3:21
18.	"10,000 Years Ago"	D. Wilson, Love	5:03
19.	"Gimme Some Lovin'" (2025 mix)	Steve Winwood, Spencer Davis, Muff Winwood	3:29
20.	"Honeycomb" (Marilyn Wilson-Rutherford vocal)	Bob Merrill	2:13
21.	"In the Back of My Mind" (1975 alternate take; 2025 mix)	B. Wilson, Love	2:45

=== Disc three ===
15 Big Ones outtakes and alternate mixes
No.	Title	Writer(s)	Length
1.	"Just Once in My Life" (2025 mix)	Gerry Goffin, Carole King, Spector	3:54
2.	"Mony, Mony" (2025 mix; with Brian Wilson)	Tommy James, Bo Gentry, Ritchie Cordell, Bobby Bloom	3:02
3.	"Running Bear" (2025 mix)	Jiles Perry Richardson	3:05
4.	"Shake, Rattle and Roll"	Jesse Stone	2:36
5.	"On Broadway" (2025 mix)	Mann, Weil, Leiber, Stoller	3:19
6.	"Sea Cruise" (2025 mix)	Huey "Piano" Smith	3:53
7.	"Chapel of Love" (2025 mix)	Jeff Barry, Ellie Greenwich, Spector	2:57
8.	"Short Skirts" (2025 mix)		2:47
9.	"TM Song" (2025 backing track mix)		1:12
10.	"Rock and Roll Music" (2025 backing track mix)	Chuck Berry	3:19
11.	"Had to Phone Ya" (2025 deconstructed mix)	B. Wilson, Love, Diane Rovell	1:59
12.	"Just Once in My Life" (2025 backing track mix)	Goffin, King, Spector	3:54

The Beach Boys Love You alternate mixes
No.	Title	Writer(s)	Length
13.	"Let Us Go On This Way" (alternate mix)	B. Wilson, Love	2:00
14.	"Mona" (deconstructed mix)		2:18
15.	"Honkin' Down the Highway" (Billy Hinsche vocal)		2:56
16.	"Ding Dang" (session highlights and unedited 2025 mix)	B. Wilson, McGuinn	2:27
17.	"Solar System" (2025 backing track mix)		3:11
18.	"The Night Was So Young" (2025 vocals only mix)		2:17
19.	"Let's Put Our Hearts Together" (2025 coda mix)		0:46

The Beach Boys Love You (Brian cassette demos)
No.	Title	Length
20.	"That Special Feeling" (demo)	1:47
21.	"It's Over Now" (demo)	2:50
22.	"They're Marching Along" (demo)	2:25
23.	"Love Is a Woman" (demo)	2:35
24.	"Mona" (demo)	1:37
25.	"Airplane" (demo)	2:28
26.	"Let's Put Our Hearts Together" (demo)	2:22
27.	"I'll Bet He's Nice" (demo)	2:31
28.	"Still I Dream of It" (demo)	3:30

== Charts ==
Chart performance for We Gotta Groove: The Brother Studio Years
Chart (2026)	Peak position
Japanese Albums (Oricon)	50
Japanese Rock Albums (Oricon)	7
Japanese Top Albums Sales (Billboard Japan)	45
UK Album Downloads (Official Charts)	15

== See also ==
- List of unreleased songs recorded by the Beach Boys
