= The Night Was So Young =

1977 song by the Beach Boys

Song by the Beach Boys

from the album The Beach Boys Love You
- Released: April 11, 1977
- Recorded: 1976–1977
- Studio: Brother Studios, California
- Length: 2:15
- Label: Brother/Reprise
- Songwriter: Brian Wilson
- Producer: Brian Wilson

Licensed audio
- "The Night Was So Young" on YouTube

"The Night Was So Young" is a song by the American rock band the Beach Boys from their 1977 album The Beach Boys Love You. Written by Brian Wilson, it is a ballad sung by Carl Wilson and reportedly inspired by the band's former fan mail sorter.

== Music and lyrics ==
"The Night Was So Young" was written by Brian Wilson and sung by his brother Carl. The lyrics discuss the singer's romantic fixation on a woman who "has to hide" and "won't even try" to steer their relationship where he desires. The narrator expresses befuddlement with their dynamic ("is somebody going to tell me why she has to lie"), and implores her to "let me come over to you".

According to Beach Boys biographer Steven Gaines, the song was written about the band's former fan mail sorter, Debbie Keil, who would often visit Brian Wilson at his home at his behest, to his wife Marilyn's chagrin. Biographers Andrew Doe and John Tobler refer to it as a "yearning ballad" that "documents one of Brian's more tangled relationships of the late Seventies." Jon Stebbins describes the song as "a direct descendent of Pet Sounds in both sound and attitude", while Peter Ames Carlin identifies "traditional shades of self-pity, jealousy, and loneliness" in the lyrics.

== Critical reception ==
Rob Hughes of Uncut rated "The Night Was So Young" among Brian Wilson's finest songs in 2012. Musician Dennis Diken, writing in the album's 2000 reissue liner notes, called it his favorite song on Love You and its "most fully realized" track in terms of instrumental arrangement. In his review of the album, Pitchfork contributor D. Erik Kempke highlighted the track's "beautiful harmonies", adding that it "sounds like it could have been a Pet Sounds outtake, were it not for the bleating synths."

== Legacy ==
Asked for his favorite songs he ever wrote, as well as the songs he felt were most underrated, in a 2009 interview, Brian Wilson included "The Night Was So Young" in both answers. In the 2016 memoir I Am Brian Wilson, the song is praised as "a beautiful ballad [...] with great harmonies". He rerecorded the song for the soundtrack to the 2021 documentary Brian Wilson: Long Promised Road.

Al Jardine called it one of his favorite Beach Boys songs in a 2000 interview, commenting: "Oh God, isn't that a remarkable bridge? With that little tempo change, it's beautiful. It is Brian and Carl at their best."

== Personnel ==
Per archivists John Brode, Will Crerar, Joshilyn Hoisington, and Craig Slowinski.

The Beach Boys

- Mike Love – backing vocals
- Brian Wilson – backing vocals, tack piano, ARP String Ensemble, Minimoog
- Carl Wilson – lead and backing vocals
- Dennis Wilson – backing vocals, drums

Additional musician

- Billy Hinsche – electric guitar
