= Ding Dang (song) =

Song by the Beach Boys

Song by the Beach Boys

from the album The Beach Boys Love You
- Released: April 11, 1977
- Recorded: June 10, 1974
- Studio: Brother (Santa Monica)
- Length: 0:57
- Label: Brother/Reprise
- Songwriters: Brian Wilson, Roger McGuinn
- Producer: Brian Wilson

Licensed audio
- "Ding Dang" on YouTube

"Ding Dang" (alternately known as "Rollin' Up to Heaven", "Clangin'", "Brian's Tune", and "Hard Time") is a song by American rock band the Beach Boys from their 1977 album The Beach Boys Love You. It was written by Brian Wilson and Roger McGuinn during an impromptu jam session after Wilson had visited McGuinn's home to acquire amphetamines.

Wilson spent years working on different recordings of "Ding Dang", and, at one point, had it earmarked for singer Annette Funicello. The song has a 57-second runtime and the only lyrics are "I love a girl and I love her so madly / I treat her so fine but she treats me so badly".

In later years, Wilson cited "Ding Dang" as one of his best songs, and one of his most inspired and underrated. The song may have kickstarted his lifelong obsession with the folk standard "Shortenin' Bread", leading him to record numerous permutations of the "Ding Dang" riff in various songs over the subsequent decades.

== Background ==
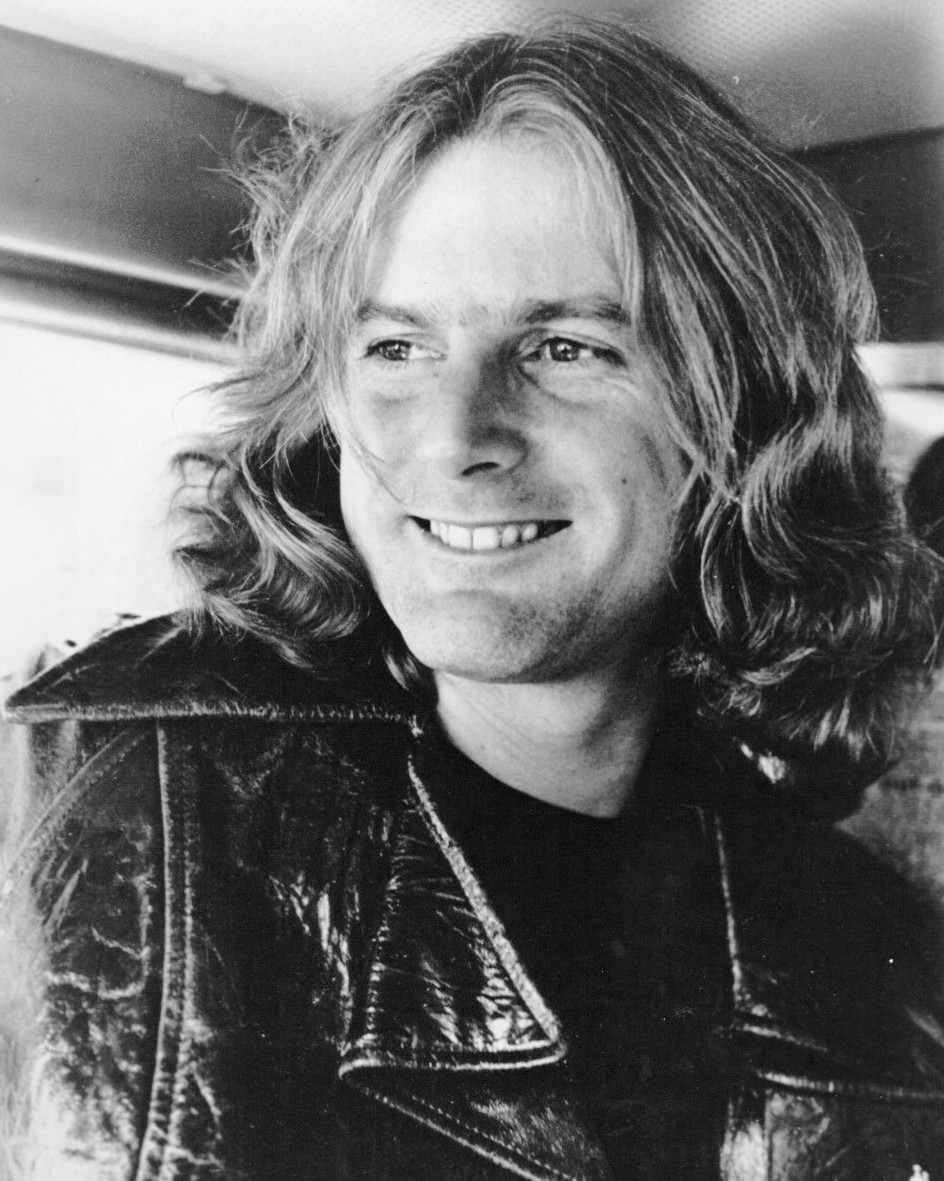
"Ding Dang" was co-written with Roger McGuinn (pictured 1976)

"Ding Dang" is a short song, consisting of a single verse and chorus, that Wilson had written with the Byrds' Roger McGuinn in the early 1970s. McGuinn recalled that Wilson had one day visited his home asking for amphetamines. After they worked together on the song, McGuinn went to bed. The next morning, he found that Wilson was still awake playing "Ding Dang" on the piano. Wilson offered a slightly different account, saying that he "didn't stay all night" at McGuinn's house. He credited McGuinn with writing the song's only lyric: "I love a girl and I love her so madly / I treat her so fine but she treats me so badly".

Al Jardine surmised that Wilson's longtime obsession with the folk standard "Shortenin' Bread" may have originated from this impromptu writing session for "Ding Dang". Music journalist Brian Chidester reported that "the basic 1-to-4-up bassline [...] seems to have endlessly percolated in Wilson’s head throughout 1974-75 on versions of 'Ding Dang' and 'Short'nin Bread' too numerous to count."

"Ding Dang" was considered for inclusion on the album that became 15 Big Ones (1976). In July 1975, NME journalist Nick Kent wrote, "Carl Wilson was able to give me some actual titles to new Brian Wilson songs recorded for the next Warner/Reprise album", one of which included "a track entitled 'Rollin’ Up to Heaven' which had originally been called 'Ding Dang' – a number that Brian had wanted Annette Funicello to record."

== Recording ==
=== "Rollin' Up to Heaven" ===
Brian recorded "Ding Dang" in the studio on numerous occasions during the mid-1970s. One of these versions, recorded in late 1974, is known as "Rollin' Up to Heaven", although it was labelled as "Brian's Tune" on the tape box. Biographer Peter Ames Carlin characterized it as "a funky rock 'n' roll song with blazing guitar from Carl, in-the-pocket drums from Dennis, and full group vocals chanting a rudimentary but instantly memorable chorus of: 'Alley-oop—fuck her! Big tits!'"

=== "Clangin'" ===
In 1976, another version of "Ding Dang" was recorded under the title "Clangin'". It has a riff similar to Wilson's "I'm the Pied Piper" from Mount Vernon and Fairway (1972). Brother Records archive manager Alan Boyd explained the contents of the recording, "Brian has overdubbed himslef [sic] a couple of times singing 'Clangin' clangin', dingin' a dangin' and-a clangin' clangin'....' over and over and over again. And again. And again." In a 1976 interview with the group, members of the band began reciting a background part, "Mow mama yama holly hallelujah". Asked what song it belonged to, Brian answered, "That's from a song called 'Clang.' [sic] We haven't really got it together yet, so we can't talk about it. It's a spiritual sort of rock 'n' roll song."

For the 1976 television special The Beach Boys: It's OK!, the band were filmed performing two takes of "Clangin'", but this footage was not used for the program. Andrew Sandoval, an archivist for the Monkees, reported that Micky Dolenz possessed a recording of "Clangin'" that featured some participation from Harry Nilsson.

=== Love You sessions ===
Band engineer Earle Mankey recalled that his first session with the Beach Boys had involved a recording of "Ding Dang", as he said, "At one session of Carl's, somebody said to Brian, 'Let's cut a track,' and he said, 'I have this great song, it's called "Ding, Dang."' It was a legendary track, and it was around, as I understand it, for a long time." Wilson again revisited the song, by then a few years old, during the recording of Love You. Mankey noted that "everybody who showed up [to the sessions] got subjected to 'Ding Dang'." It appeared on the album with a less than one-minute runtime, virtually unaltered from how Wilson and McGuinn originally left it.

== Legacy ==
Reflecting on The Beach Boys Love You in a 2000 interview, Wilson said that "Ding Dang" was one of his two favorite tracks on the album. He added, "it was a good cut, wasn't it? Just a very short song, that's all. One of the shortest records we have ever made." Asked for his favorite songs he ever wrote, as well as the songs he felt were most underrated, Wilson included "Ding Dang" in his answers.

== Cover versions ==
- 2006 – Yo La Tengo, Yo La Tengo Is Murdering the Classics

== Personnel ==
Credits sourced from John Brode, Will Crerar, Joshilyn Hoisington, and Craig Slowinski.

The Beach Boys

- Brian Wilson - group vocals, grand piano, Minimoog
- Carl Wilson - group vocals, electric guitar, Wurlitzer 200A electric piano
- Mike Love - lead and group vocals

Additional musicians

- Ed Carter - bass guitar
- Ricky Fataar - group vocals, drums
- Billy Hinsche - Hammond B-3 organ

== See also ==
- List of unreleased songs recorded by the Beach Boys
- "Alley Oop" (song)
