= The Beach Boys Love You =

1977 studio album by the Beach Boys

Studio album by the Beach Boys
- Released: April 11, 1977
- Recorded: January 7, 1970 – June 10, 1974 (older recordings); October 1976 – January 1977 (album sessions)
- Studios: Brother (Santa Monica); Beach Boys (Los Angeles)
- Genres: Synth-pop; art pop; rock
- Length: 34:50
- Labels: Brother; Reprise
- Producer: Brian Wilson

The Beach Boys chronology
15 Big Ones (1976)	The Beach Boys Love You (1977)	M.I.U. Album (1978)

Singles from The Beach Boys Love You
- 1. "Honkin' Down the Highway" Released: May 30, 1977

The Beach Boys Love You is the 21st studio album by the American rock band the Beach Boys, released on April 11, 1977, by Brother/Reprise. The album is characterized by its stream-of-consciousness lyrics, its use of Moog and ARP synthesizers, and the band members' gravelly vocal timbres. It was produced by Brian Wilson in late 1976 at Brother Studios; he wrote nearly all of the material and performed most of the instrumentation, including keyboards, synthesizers, and drums, with assistance from brothers Carl (credited as "mixdown producer") and Dennis.

Provisionally a solo record titled Brian Loves You, Wilson had aimed to satisfy fans disappointed by the group's previous album 15 Big Ones (1976). His new songs returned to the self-reflective approach of Pet Sounds (1966) and drew inspiration from his family and personal life, Phil Spector, Johnny Carson, and the Solar System. Two more were co-written and recorded several years prior, "Good Time" with Al Jardine and "Ding Dang" with Roger McGuinn, while Mike Love co-wrote "Let Us Go On This Way". Wilson called the record his most creatively satisfying work since Pet Sounds and later his favorite Beach Boys album overall.

Although Love You received near-unanimous critical praise, some listeners were put off by its tone, production, and vocals. It peaked at number 53 in the U.S. and number 28 in the UK; lead single "Honkin' Down the Highway" did not chart. A follow-up, Adult/Child, was completed but unreleased. Love You later gained a cult following and became sometimes regarded as the band's "punk" album and a precursor to synth-pop and new wave. It was Wilson's last album made without substantial outside involvement and the last he largely wrote and produced until his solo debut, Brian Wilson (1988). Jardine toured the album during 2025–2026 in support of its expanded reissue, We Gotta Groove: The Brother Studio Years (2026).

== Background ==
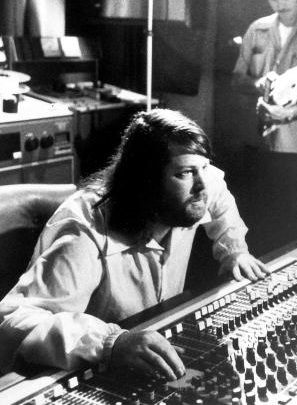
Brian Wilson producing 15 Big Ones at Brother Studios in early 1976, months before recording this album.

In late 1975, Wilson became a patient under psychologist Eugene Landy's 24-hour therapy program. Under Landy's care, he showed increased stability, sociability, and productivity. During the latter half of 1976, he became a regular member of the band's touring line-up for the first time since 1964. The tagline "Brian's Back!" was a major promotional tool for the tours and 15 Big Ones, released in July, which marked their first U.S. top-10 Beach Boys LP with new material since Pet Sounds (1966) and their first solely produced by Wilson since that album.

15 Big Ones, split evenly between covers and originals, was poorly received by most fans and group members. Wilson described it in interviews as "nothing too deep" and promised their next release would rival "Good Vibrations" (1966). (Note: In one interview, he stated that he had been suffering from writer's block: "Material is getting harder and harder to write all the time for me. I don't know why." A year later, he claimed to have written about 28 new songs for the new album.) From July to August 1976, Wilson toured with the band before beginning a period of solitary studio work, producing a large collection of recordings while the other members pursued individual projects. Dennis Wilson worked on Pacific Ocean Blue (1977), Carl Wilson produced Ricci Martin's Beached (1977), Mike Love taught Transcendental Meditation, and Al Jardine spent time with his family. Landy was dismissed in early December amid disputes over his fees and methods. (Note: Gaines writes that Wilson's Love You material was written under the "aegis" of Landy, while Wilson's 1991 memoir, Wouldn't It Be Nice: My Own Story, states that about half of the songs on the album were co-written and co-produced by Landy, with his credits being omitted at the group's behest.)

== Production ==
Love You was primarily recorded during October and November 1976 at the band's Brother Studios in Santa Monica, California. "Good Time" and "Ding Dang" were recorded earlier in 1970 and 1974, respectively. By fall 1976, he had demoed several new songs for the band at Brother Studios, including "Airplane", "I'll Bet He's Nice", "It's Over Now", "Let's Put Our Hearts Together", "Love Is a Woman", "They're Marching Along", "Mona", and "Still I Dream of It".

The sessions marked the first time that Brian was granted complete artistic latitude on a new Beach Boys album since the 1967 Smile sessions. He wrote nearly all of the material and played most of the instruments, including keyboards, synthesizers, drums, tubular bells, and harmonica. Carl and Dennis contributed instrumentation across 11 of the 14 tracks, whereas Jardine and Love were rarely present, mostly contributing vocals. All members sang lead on at least one track. Jardine described it as "Carl's tribute to Brian", stating that Carl and Dennis "had the most to do with that album" and added, "The title of that album is really The Beach Boys Love Brian." Biographers Peter Ames Carlin and Christian Matijas-Mecca characterized the album as essentially a Brian Wilson solo project, with Jon Stebbins calling it "pretty much a Wilson brothers album" shaped by Dennis and Carl's support.

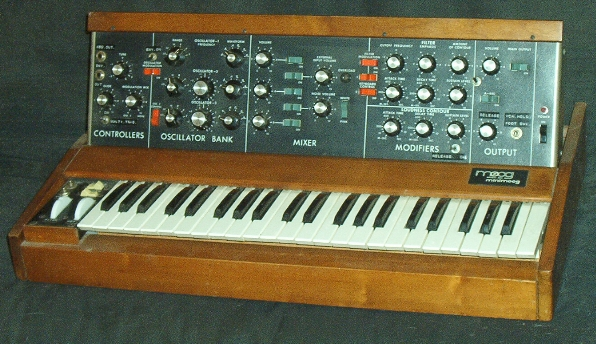
Synthesizers such as the Minimoog (pictured) and ARP String Ensemble were employed on every track except "Good Time"

Brother Studios engineer Earle Mankey, returning from 15 Big Ones, recalled that Wilson displayed greater self-discipline during the Love You sessions, typically working from 10 or 11 a.m. to early afternoon. He stated that Wilson initiated sessions voluntarily, "instead of being forced into it." Contrasting his earlier use of acoustic orchestration, electronic timbres dominate Love You, with Wilson relying more extensively on the Moog synthesizer than on 15 Big Ones. All bass parts were performed by Wilson using ARP and Moog synthesizers. His use of synthesizers were influenced in part by Wendy Carlos' Switched-On Bach (1969) and formed the album's "oddball sound", according to biographer Mark Dillon. Jardine acknowledged, "The Minimoogs are all over the place."

Drums were played by Brian on six tracks and by Dennis on five, while Carl performed electric guitar on six tracks. Guitarists Ed Carter and Billy Hinsche, both players in the touring band, and saxophonists Jay Migliori and Steve Douglas also contributed as session musicians. As on 15 Big Ones, the vocals of Dennis and Brian were audibly coarse, referenced by Carlin as a "gravelly, messed-up baritone". Carl was credited as "mixdown producer". According to Mankey, Carl took his production seriously and carefully mixed tracks, whereas Brian typically approved mixes after a single pass with only minor adjustments. Brother Records archive manager Alan Boyd explained that Carl's "mixdown producer" credit partly derived from adding dynamics to Brian's arrangements by subracting elements from his mixes.

== Songs ==
=== Overview ===
It's a frighteningly accurate album. It may have sounded like a lighthearted album. But that's a serious, autobiographical album: Brian Wilson giving what he had. Sort of like Eraserhead.

— Engineer Earle Mankey

The first side of the album consists of uptempo songs, while the second reflects a more adult perspective. The lyrics range from stream-of-consciousness writing to adolescent themes such as roller skating, schoolmate infatuations, and interacting with a girlfriend's family. Wilson stated that he pursued this lyrical direction because he believed it was what fans expected from the Beach Boys.

Comparing Love You to 15 Big Ones, he said he aimed for it to be "more creative, more original" and "lyrically much more interesting." He later described the lyrics as reflecting his thirties in the same way Pet Sounds had reflected his twenties. Mankey remarked that the songs may have seemed unusual to listeners because the public was less familiar with Wilson's solo lyrical style than with his past co-written material: "The Beach Boys Love You songs might have seemed odder because no one knew what Brian was really like." (Note: Biographer Timothy White described the album as "a portrait of a man trying to redefine his shattered personality". Carlin characterized it as a reframing of the Beach Boys' early themes through Wilson's distorted adult perspective. Dillon wrote that it resembled "a tour through the cracked fun-house mirror of [his] imagination", and felt that the band's age made their performances of adolescent-themed songs "a little creepy". Stebbins interpreted some tracks, including "Roller Skating Child" and "I Wanna Pick You Up", as conveying an "unsettling, pedophilic overtone".)

=== Side one ===
"Let Us Go On This Way" is a rock song in which the narrator, a schoolboy, pleads, "To get you babe, I went through the ringer / ain't gonna let you slip through my finger", followed by an appeal to God to "let us go on this way". Wilson said he wrote the song with Mike Love when they felt the rest of the album was too "deadbeat [sic] and we needed something uptempo". "Roller Skating Child" expands on the themes of "Let Us Go On This Way". Wilson said the song was a tribute to his daughters Carnie and Wendy. He clarified, "Carnie actually goes ice-skating but I called it 'Roller skating child, with a ribbon in her hair.' We all go out to a skating rink in Santa Monica." (Note: Carlin writes that it differs from "Let Us Go On This Way" in its "grown-up perspective", likening the song to "a kind of musical interpretation of Vladimir Nabokov's novel Lolita, complete with vivid descriptions of adolescent sexuality ... careless parenting [and] lust-fueled escape".")

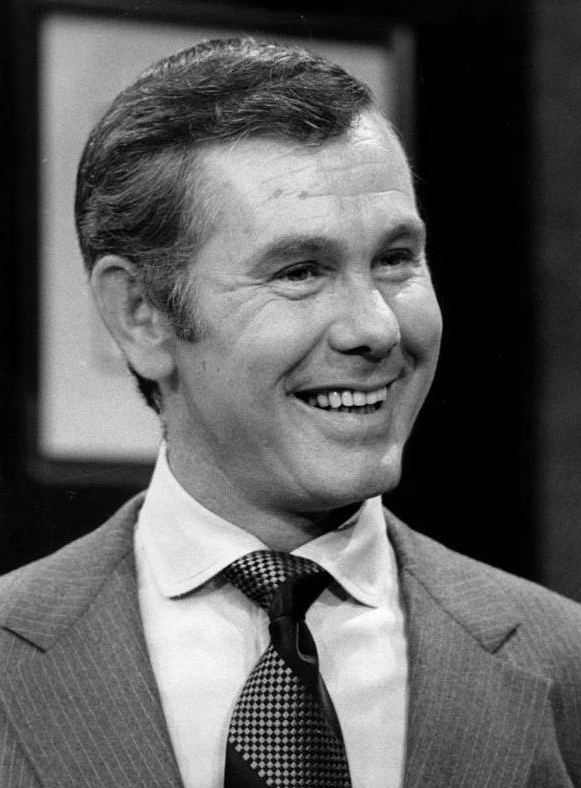
Love You includes a tribute to the talk show host Johnny Carson (pictured 1965)

"Mona" is a 1950s-style love song built on four chords, with lyrics referencing Wilson's favorite Phil Spector productions, including "Da Doo Ron Ron" and "Be My Baby" (both 1963). "Johnny Carson" expresses admiration for the host of The Tonight Show Starring Johnny Carson. Carlin referred to the track as the album's "pivot point", separating "the normal from the freakishly bizarre."

"Good Time" has the narrator declaring of his girlfriends, "Maybe it won't last but what do we care / My baby and I just want a good time". The track employed a nine-piece horn section and had previously been released with different vocals by American Spring on their 1972 album Spring, produced by Wilson. Wilson explained that he had recycled the song for Love You because he did not want the song to languish in obscurity. As it predated Wilson's vocal decline, it is the only track on Love You in which his voice is not gravelly.

"Honkin' Down the Highway" is a rock and roll song about a man driving to a woman, at her father's behest, for an engagement that the narrator states will conclude with himself "Takin' one little inch at a time, now / 'Til we're feelin' fine, now". Wilson said that the highway theme was inspired by country music.

"Ding Dang" is a brief track composed of one verse and chorus, written by Wilson and the Byrds' Roger McGuinn in the early 1970s. Wilson repeatedly recorded and revised the song in the studio throughout the mid-1970s, and Mankey recalled that "everybody who showed up [to the Love You sessions] got subjected to 'Ding Dang'." The album version runs under one minute and remains nearly unchanged from the original Wilson–McGuinn version. Former member Ricky Fataar played drums on the track.

=== Side two ===
"Solar System", the only track where Brian played every instrument, discusses the Solar System in a similar vein as the band's 1965 hit "California Girls". Its lyrics include: "What do the planets mean? / And have you ever seen / sunrise in the mornin'? / It shined when you were born". "The Night Was So Young" reflects themes of self-pity, jealousy, and loneliness. Wilson wrote the song about his extramarital affair with Debbie Keil, the band's former fanmail sorter who visited his home nightly. Stebbins described it as "a direct descendent of Pet Sounds in both sound and attitude."

Opening verse of "I'll Bet He's Nice"
Dennis and Brian Wilson share the lead vocal over a dueling guitar and synthesizer arrangement

"I'll Bet He's Nice", stylistically akin to "The Night Was So Young", features shared lead vocals from the Wilson brothers, with Brian and Dennis on the verses and Carl on the bridge. "Let's Put Our Hearts Together" is a duet between Wilson and his wife Marilyn, in which they address mutual insecurities before agreeing to "see what we can cook up between us". Wilson stated that he involved Marilyn after inadvertently writing the song in a key outside his vocal range.

I worked specifically at getting the lyrics right, so that the lyrics would be interesting enough to listen to. Like, "I love to pick you up because you're still a baby to me"—you know, things like that. Interesting.

— Brian Wilson, 1977

"I Wanna Pick You Up" was written about his daughter Carnie, although he later referred to the lyrics as describing a man pretending a woman is "small like a baby" and "really wants to pick her up!" At the end, the singer tells the listener to "pat, pat, pat her on her butt, butt / She's gone to sleep, be quiet". It is the only track where a Mellotron was used. "Airplane" is a love song narrated from the viewpoint of a person in flight. "Love Is a Woman" closes the album with saxophone and flute instrumentation. Wilson wrote, "It's just about everybody, about anything, about how things are. It's an idea that a woman is love. A baby is love, too, of course. It's just an experience, you know? 'Love is a Baby' would have been a better title."

== Leftover songs and outtakes ==
Several songs recorded or developed during the Love You sessions were excluded from the album. These included the originals "That Special Feeling", "11th Bar Blues", "Clangin'", "Hey Little Tomboy", "Lazy Lizzie", "Sherry She Needs Me", "Marilyn Rovell", "My Diane", "Hey There Momma", and "We Gotta Groove". Wilson also recorded covers of the Drifters' "Ruby Baby" and the Righteous Brothers' "You've Lost That Lovin' Feelin'", the latter originally produced by Spector. Wilson performed and recorded the latter track in one take; Boyd characterized his performance as "very dark" and "very raw" with "kind of a punk edge to it".

"Sherry She Needs Me" originated during the Summer Days (and Summer Nights!!) sessions, with Wilson later overdubbing a new lead vocal onto the 1965 backing track. "Lazy Lizzie" recycled a melody from Wilson's Mount Vernon and Fairway (1973). (Note: Biographer David Leaf described it as "a fully realized production as well as a strong example of Brian's songwriting ability.") "Hey Little Tomboy" and "My Diane" were completed for the group's next released album, M.I.U. Album (1978). "11th Bar Blues" remains unreleased.

== Title and packaging ==
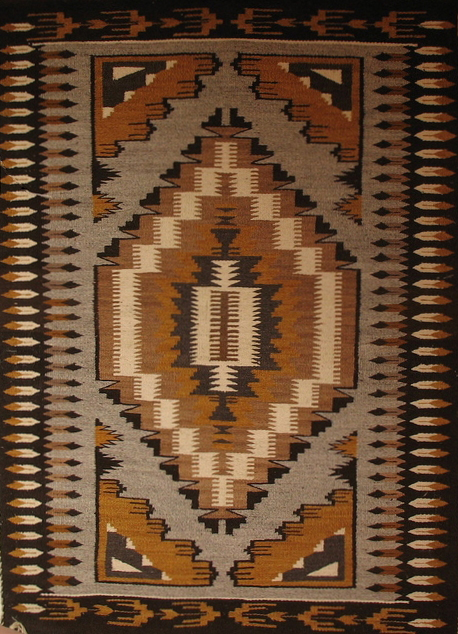
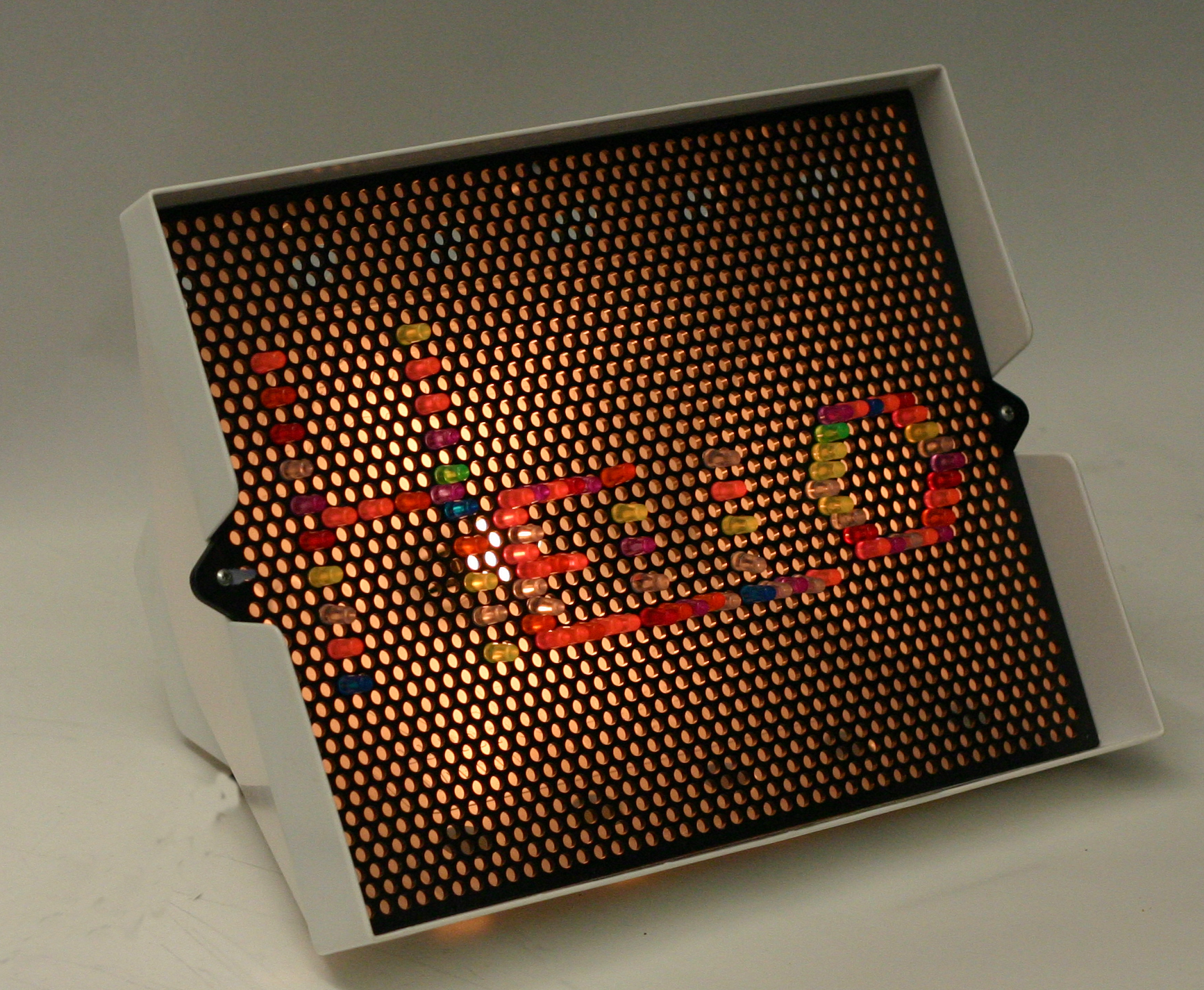
Although intended to resemble a Navajo rug (left), the album's cover design has drawn comparisons to a Lite-Brite toy (right).

Wilson originally intended to title the album Brian Loves You, with the "you" referring to the group's fanbase. He said he chose the name Love You because he "thought it would be a good sound people could feel secure with". To present the album as a group effort, the title was changed to The Beach Boys Love You. Reflecting the new title, the inner sleeve features a photo of Wilson at a party with Marilyn, beneath which his bandmates wrote, "To Brian, whom we love with all our hearts ..." The dedication reads:

We wish to express our appreciation, and acknowledge your willingness to create and support totally the completion of these songs. We thank you for sharing yourself and your music with us, and all those who love you as well. An unspeakable joy being with you [sic] in your expression of the music you put out there for everyone. Brian, we feel honored and grateful and we love you.

Dean Torrence designed the cover illustration to resemble a Navajo rug, and proposed the title Cowabunga, referencing Chief Thunderball's catch-phrase from Howdy Doody. Jardine criticized the cover as "so crummy", calling it "home made" and attributing its quality to Warner Bros.' belief that it would be the group's final album for the label. He said they "didn't spend a penny" and used "real cheap cardboard". Torrence countered that costly paper had been used to replicate a stitched texture. Dillon wrote that the design "inadvertently suggests a Lite-Brite toy, which suits the childlike wonder of the record's contents."

== Release and promotion ==
On November 27, 1976, Wilson appeared as the musical guest on NBC's Saturday Night, performing "Love Is a Woman", "Back Home", and "Good Vibrations". It marked his first solo television appearance since 1967's Inside Pop: The Rock Revolution. Producer Lorne Michaels required Wilson to perform without his bandmates, who were playing the third of three sold-out shows at Madison Square Garden. (Note: Wilson had attended the first two shows.) Another solo appearance, taped days earlier for The Mike Douglas Show, included an interview about Wilson's past drug use and aired on December 8. That month, Wilson told a Oui magazine reporter that he had considered releasing his new songs under his own name, stating he had wanted to issue a solo album but did not want to provoke inner-band politics: "They want to keep the material for the Beach Boys, too". He added he had temporarily left the group to pursue the "freedom ... to do my own album", and was undecided about remaining as their producer or starting a solo career. On December 31, the band held a fifteenth anniversary concert at the Los Angeles Forum, including a performance of "Airplane".

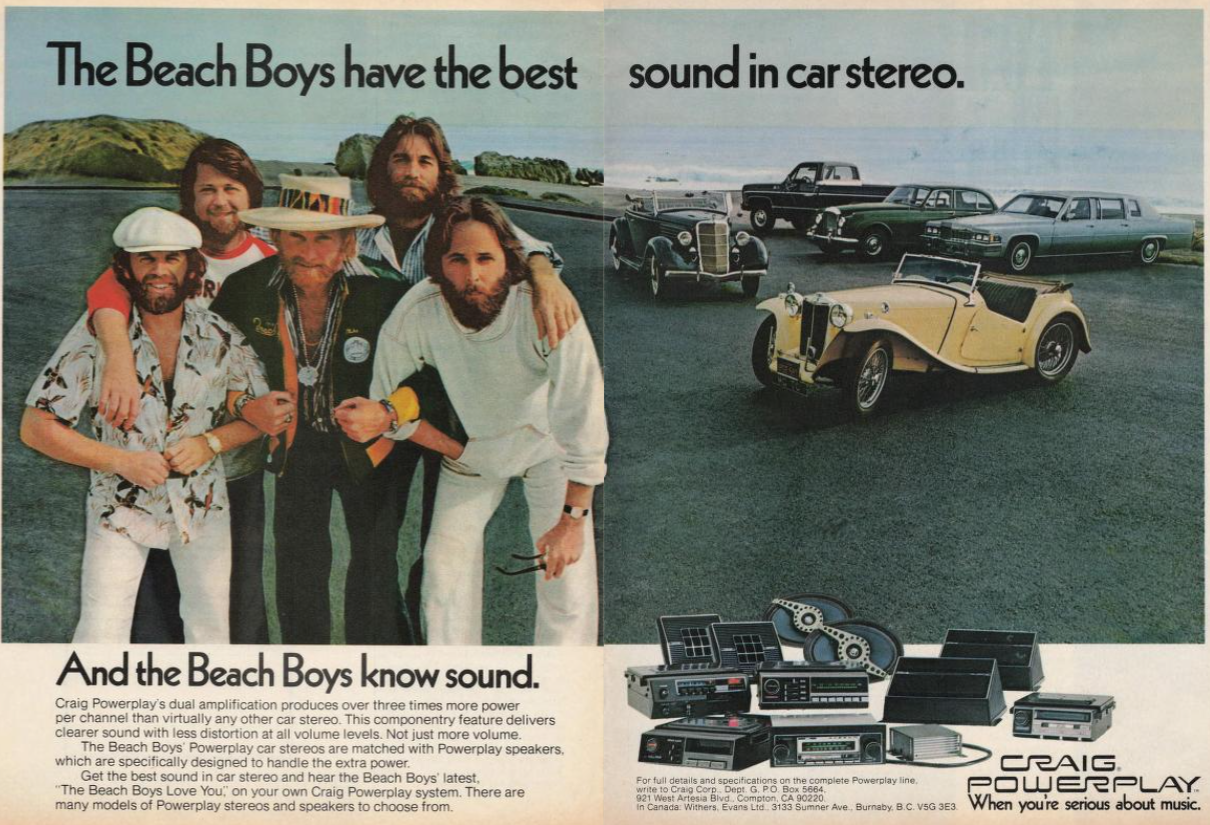
A contemporary car stereo ad promoting The Beach Boys Love You. The band attributed the album's poor sales to minimal promotion by Warner Bros.

By early 1977, media interest in the "Brian's Back" campaign had waned. The Beach Boys had been legally obligated to deliver two more albums to Warner Bros., whose contract was set to expire later in the year. Biographer Steven Gaines writes that the label were "none too happy" with Love You. Road manager Rick Nelson stated, "Most of the people at the company liked it, but [label head] Mo Ostin thought that it should be touched up. He didn't think it was finished. It wasn't that he didn't like it musically. Somehow, word that Mo felt that way got back to Brian and hurt him deeply." As Love You neared completion, band manager Stephen Love began negotiations for the group to join CBS Records after fulfilling their Warner Bros. contract. According to biographer David Leaf, there had been rumors that the band would have the album issued by CBS or Caribou Records.

Warner was reportedly aware of the CBS deal by January 1977, which contributed to their disillusionment with the band, according to Gaines. The Beach Boys Love You was released on April 11, peaking at number 53 on the U.S. Billboard Top LPs & Tape chart during a seven-week run. Its sole single, "Honkin' Down the Highway", failed to chart. Group members, including Mike Love, blamed Warner's restrained promotional efforts for the album's poor sales.

== Contemporary reactions ==
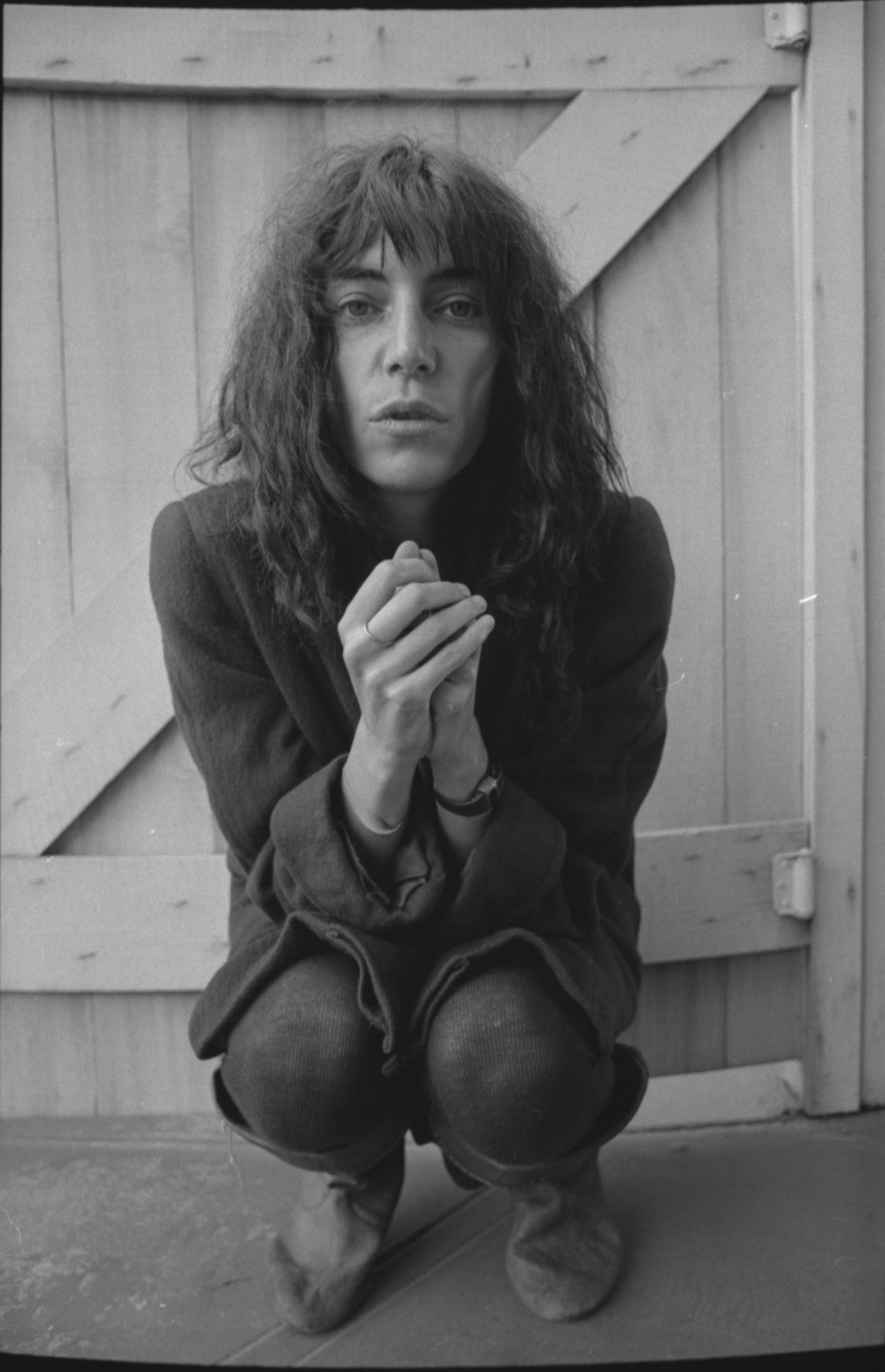
One of the album's admirers, Patti Smith, penned a review of Love You that was written in the form of a poem

Love You received near-unanimous critical praise but divided public opinion. Schinder described a "sharp divide" between fans and critics, the latter viewing it either as "eccentric genius" or dismissing it as "childish and trivial". Record reviewers were broadly favorable. In his 1978 biography of the band, John Tobler wrote that Love You was "in the author's estimation and that of several critics ... the best released by the group since the '60s." Some listeners interpreted it as a near-punk statement or as a subversion of prevailing pop trends. Patti Smith, herself known as the "godmother of punk", submitted a poem-review in Hit Parader. Wilson reviewed the album himself in the May 1977 Crawdaddy!, stating in part, "I like the new album better than the last one ... It's a cleaner album; the tracks and the songs seem to come off cleaner."

This is really the first time since Pet Sounds that I've felt this thoroughly satisfied with an album. I think it gives a little bit, it has a little extra.

— Brian Wilson, 1977

Positive reviews came from Circus' Lester Bangs, Creem's Mitchell Cohen, NME's Nick Kent, The Village Voice's Robert Christgau, and Rolling Stone's Billy Altman. Bangs called it the group's "best album ever" and characterized them as a "diseased bunch of motherfuckers" whose finest moments evoked "a vast dream cathedral decorated with a thousand gleaming American pop culture icons". Altman described it as a "flawed but enjoyable" Wilson comeback, with his strongest recent songs but diminished vocal performance. A reviewer for Melody Maker wrote that the album "can appear insubstantial on early acquaintance, but further attention yields many riches." The Ottawa Citizen's reviewer opined that it was consistent with "some of the best Beach Boy music, on the surface it's garbage but if you let it get to you, it's absolutely great...".

Many listeners rejected the album's idiosyncrasies, production, and vocal approach. Michael Tearson's review for Leaf's fanzine Pet Sounds was among the few negative responses. Another review in Audio called the album "a real disappointment ... patronizing and disastrous", and suggested it was made to fulfill contractual obligations; that critic accused others of offering insincere praise and commended Tearson as "the only record reviewer who told it like it is. It took guts." Author Peter Doggett later suggested that "almost without exception, North American critics were baffled or appalled", citing reviews from The Miami Herald ("a lyrical disaster") and the Montreal Star ("abysmal songs that communicate nothing at all").

Peter Ames Carlin, then a junior high school student who had eagerly anticipated the album's release, recalled of his reaction, "This was his big return — all original songs; a complete Brian production. And you listen to it and you were like, 'What the hell is this?' It's so different." Writing in his 1978 biography of the band, David Leaf felt that it was an "uncommercial" and "unfinished" work with outtakes superior to the released songs, albeit "still a personal album from Brian ... although there was some indication that he was being 'asked' to write songs that would appeal to teens."

== Post-release, Adult/Child, live performances, and We Gotta Groove ==
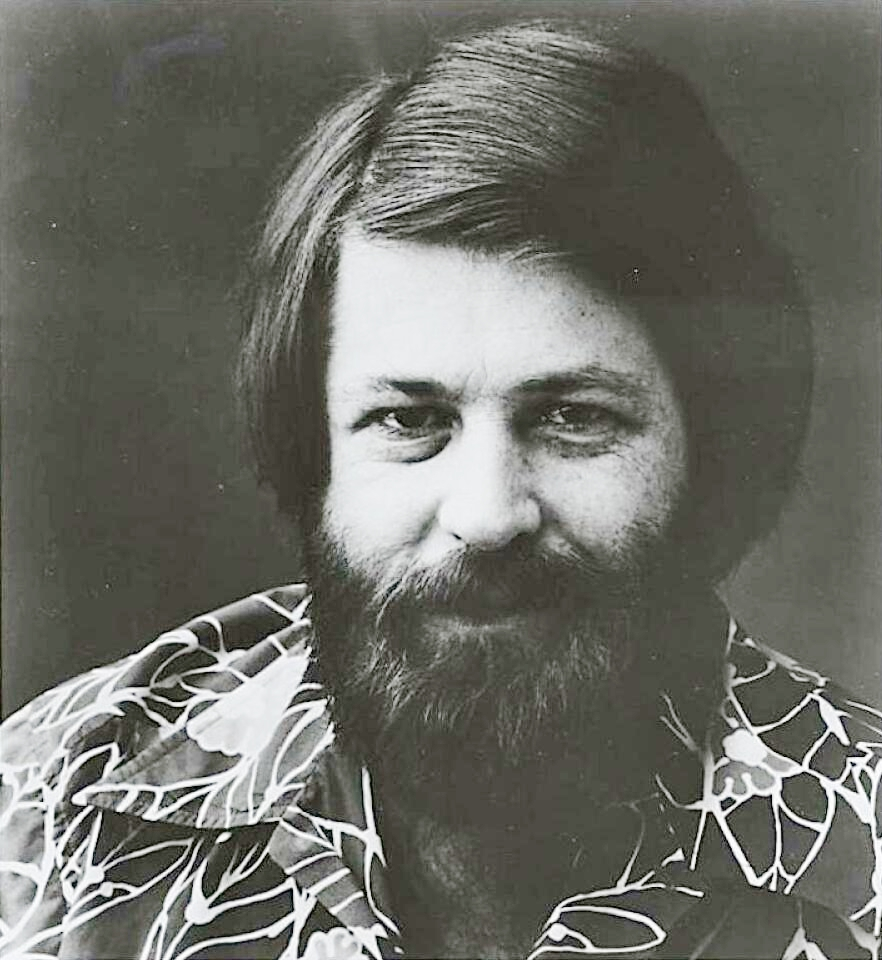
Wilson (pictured in the late 1970s) regarded Love You as his favorite Beach Boys album.

In early 1977, Wilson completed a follow-up album, Adult/Child, but its release was vetoed by his bandmates, partly due to the poor sales of Love You. He did not write and produce another LP until his solo debut, Brian Wilson (1988), and, according to Carlin, did not again compose material reflecting his full musical, emotional, and intellectual interests until the aborted Andy Paley sessions in the 1990s. Love You remained the last Beach Boys album he actively led in production. (Note: Critic Erik Kempke wrote that it "stands in sharp contrast to the albums that preceded and followed it, because it was a product of genuine inspiration on Brian Wilson's part, with little outside interference." Matijas-Mecca described Wilson as embittered by the band's lack of support of his new music and taking "the path of least, or no, resistance when working with the Beach Boys" in the following decades.)

Wilson repeatedly named Love You his favorite Beach Boys album, stating in 1998, "That's when it all happened for me. That's where my heart lies. Love You, Jesus, that's the best album we ever made." He performed "The Night Was So Young" at solo concerts and rerecorded the song for the soundtrack to the 2021 documentary Brian Wilson: Long Promised Road. In 2000, he named "I Wanna Pick You Up" and "Ding Dang" as favorites, calling it "one of the shortest records we have ever made." Asked in 2009 which of his works were underrated, he cited Love You and the tracks "Ding Dang", "Johnny Carson", "The Night Was So Young", and "I'll Bet He's Nice".

Carl reflected in a mid-1977 interview that he "wasn't entirely satisfied with that album" and felt it sounded incomplete while lacking "that stamp, the harmonies". Al Jardine rerecorded "Honkin' Down the Highway" on his 2010 solo album A Postcard from California and supported performing the entirety of Love You in concert in a 2013 interview, adding that "those are some of the best songs we ever did". Mike Love, who led his own touring version of the group since the 1990s, called Love You "undeniably original but fragmented and just plain odd" and never performed material from the album. In 2025, Jardine performed most of Love You on tour with the Pet Sounds Band, a reformed version of Wilson's band, following Wilson's death in June.

In February 2026, Capitol released We Gotta Groove: The Brother Studio Years, an expanded reissue of Love You that included seventeen tracks of alternate mixes and outtakes, marking the debut of "Clangin'", "Lazy Lizzie", "Marilyn Rovell", "We Gotta Groove", "Hey There Mama", and Brian's cassette demos of "That Special Feeling" and "They're Marching Along". (Note: "Hey There Mama" had been reworked as "I Saw Santa (Rockin' Around the Christmas Tree)" and issued on the 1998 compilation Ultimate Christmas. "Sherry She Needs Me" and "You've Lost That Lovin' Feelin'" were first released on the box set Made in California (2013). Five of the cassette demos were released on Wilson's official website in 2021.) On February 21, Jardine's Pet Sounds Band performed the album in its entirety for the first time at the United Artists Theatre in Los Angeles. Marilyn Wilson-Rutherford joined the band onstage for "Let's Put Our Hearts Together" and reprised her original vocal part.

== Musical impact ==
According to Dillon, Love You influenced the development of new wave, while Tony Sclafani wrote in The Washington Post that Wilson "helped invent synth-pop" with the album. Doggett identified Wilson's substitution of bass guitar with a synthesizer as effectively preempting the New Romantic movement and The Michigan Daily contributor Adam Theisan characterized the album as anticipating "new wave experiments, arty bands like Talking Heads and synth-pop in general years before they hit the mainstream." Wilson stated in 2000, "It's funny because now people are beginning to see that album as a classic – it was quite revolutionary in its use of synthesizers."

Fleetwood Mac's Lindsey Buckingham voiced admiration of the album's arrangements. Thurston Moore of Sonic Youth was introduced to the Beach Boys through Patti Smith's review of Love You. R.E.M.'s Peter Buck described the record as "a window into the heart of one of the greatest composers of the twentieth century" and named it his favorite Beach Boys album. Producer Alan Boyd called it "a fascinating record" with "its own sonic texture that no one has ever tried to do before. ... Some of those songs and chord progressions are among the richest and the deepest that Brian ever did."

Wondermints member Darian Sahanaja, who later joined Wilson's backing band, released "I Wanna Pick You Up" as a single in 1997. Alex Chilton covered "I Wanna Pick You Up" for the 2000 tribute compilation Caroline Now!, which also featured "Honkin' Down the Highway" by the Radio Sweethearts, "Good Time" by Stevie Jackson of Belle and Sebastian, and "Let's Put Our Hearts Together" by Chip Taylor and Evie Sands. Chilton also recorded "Solar System", later issued on his 2013 album Electricity by Candlelight. Yo La Tengo's live version of "Ding Dang" appeared on their 2006 compilation Yo La Tengo Is Murdering the Classics.

== Retrospective assessments ==
Retrospective professional ratings
Review scores
Source	Rating
AllMusic	4/5 stars
Blender	3/5 stars
Christgau's Record Guide	A
The Encyclopedia of Popular Music	3/5 stars
Entertainment Weekly	A
MusicHound Rock	4/5 stars
Pitchfork Media	7.8/10
The Rolling Stone Album Guide	4/5 stars
Uncut	8/10

Love You remained divisive among the band's fanbase. It developed a cult following and is sometimes regarded as one of the band's finest albums. In 1981, Musician magazine's Geoffrey Himes called it Wilson's "most ambitious and successful work of the decade", placing it alongside Katy Lied (1975), Zuma (1975), and Tusk (1979) as among the decade's best California rock albums. The underground fanzine Scram dismissed the album's "naysayers" and praised its mix of humor and sadness, with lyrics "just a step away from the cliché" coupled with "themes that make you wonder why they had never been explored before." Robert Christgau of The Village Voice described it as "inspired, not least because it calls forth forbidden emotions ... As with Wild Honey, the music sounds wrong in contradictory ways at first--both arty and cute, spare and smarmy--but on almost every cut it comes together soon enough".

AllMusic's John Bush praised the album, identifying "The Night Was So Young", "I'll Bet He's Nice", and "Let's Put Our Hearts Together" as a side-two suite with emotional depth "to rival Pet Sounds". Reviewing the album's 2000 reissue, Pitchfork's D. Erik Kempke stated that despite "a couple throwaways" ("Good Time" and "Ding Dang"), "Brian's songwriting and arranging talents are intact and in full force. ... one can't help but regret that he has never again created music as original and individualistic as presented on this release in the ensuing years." The Rolling Stone Album Guide (2004) contributor Chris Ryan declared it "one of Wilson's most overlooked works" featuring "hilarious and bizarre tunes" and "gentle piano melodies in songs that show a man has been damaged but not destroyed". Writing in 2007, Keith Phipps of The A.V. Club felt discomfort with the lyrics of songs such as "Roller Skating Child" but found that the album revealed "a touching vulnerability" and "a winning, human directness."

Colin Larkin rued in The Encyclopedia of Popular Music that "the material was of average quality". In his 2017 book about Wilson's songwriting, Christian Matijas-Mecca characterized it as "extraordinary in its sheer originality and its rejection of contemporary trends", comparing it to "the Smiley Smile of 1977." He described it as "the most unexpected album" of the year and stated it "remains as surprising and refreshing today as it did upon its original release." In 2023, Love You was ranked number 26 in Paste magazine's list of the greatest synth-pop albums in history. Contributor Matthew Mitchell pointed to "I'll Bet He's Nice", "The Night Was So Young", and "Roller Skating Child" as among the band's "purest compositions".

Following the album's 2026 reissue, AllMusic's Tim Sendra called it one of the band's "finest, weirdest albums" and "a complete left-field, outsider pop classic [that stands] the test of time". Pitchfork's Ben Cardew deemed the album "historically important" in its usage of synthesizers, "like David Bowie's Low on Californian zinfandel", while containing "stunning pop songs that shine through the novelty".

== Track listing ==
All tracks are written by Brian Wilson, except where noted.

Side one
No.	Title	Lead vocal(s)	Length
1.	"Let Us Go On This Way" (Brian Wilson, Mike Love)	Carl Wilson with Love	1:58
2.	"Roller Skating Child"	Love and C. Wilson, with Al Jardine and B. Wilson	2:17
3.	"Mona"	Dennis Wilson	2:06
4.	"Johnny Carson"	Love and C. Wilson	2:47
5.	"Good Time" (Wilson, Al Jardine)	B. Wilson	2:50
6.	"Honkin' Down the Highway"	Jardine	2:48
7.	"Ding Dang" (Wilson, Roger McGuinn)	Love	0:57

Side two
No.	Title	Lead vocal(s)	Length
1.	"Solar System"	B. Wilson	2:49
2.	"The Night Was So Young"	C. Wilson	2:15
3.	"I'll Bet He's Nice"	D. Wilson and B. Wilson with C. Wilson	2:36
4.	"Let's Put Our Hearts Together"	B. Wilson and Marilyn Wilson	2:14
5.	"I Wanna Pick You Up"	D. Wilson with B. Wilson	2:39
6.	"Airplane"	Love and B. Wilson with C. Wilson	3:05
7.	"Love Is a Woman"	B. Wilson and Love with Jardine	2:57
Total length:			34:50

== Personnel ==
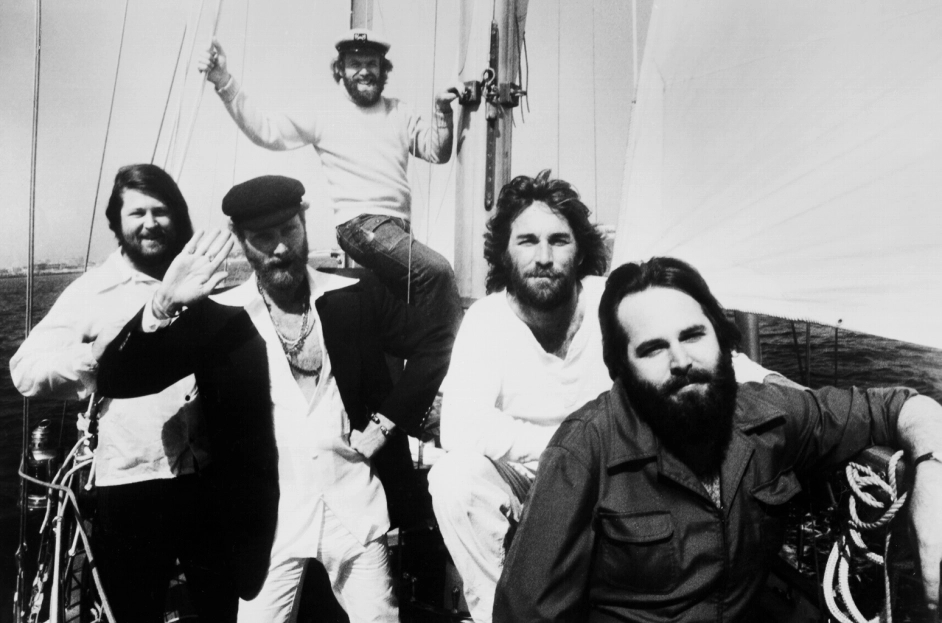
The Beach Boys in a 1976 publicity shot. From left: Brian, Love, Jardine, Dennis, and Carl.

Adapted from We Gotta Groove sessionography compiled by John Brode, Will Crerar, Joshilyn Hoisington, and Craig Slowinski.

The Beach Boys

- Al Jardine – lead (2, 6, 14) and backing vocals (1-5, 8, 10, 11, 13, 14), 12-string electric guitar (5), handclaps (2, 10)
- Mike Love – lead (1, 2, 4, 7, 13, 14) and backing vocals (all except 6 and 12), handclaps (2, 10)
- Brian Wilson – lead (2, 5, 8, 10-14) and backing vocals (all tracks), grand (1-4, 6-8, 11-14) and tack pianos (2, 8, 9, 12), Hammond organ (1, 2, 4, 8, 13, 14), Baldwin electric harpsichord (10), clavinet (6), ARP String Ensemble (6, 8, 9), Minimoog (all except 5), accordion (3), Mellotron (12), harmonicas (5), drums (1, 2, 4, 8, 13, 14), handclaps (2, 10), tubular bells (3, 8)
- Carl Wilson – lead (1, 2, 4, 9, 10, 13) and backing vocals (1, 2, 4, 5, 7, 9, 10, 12, 13), electric guitar (2, 7, 12, 13), 12-string electric guitar (5, 12), ukuleles (5), Wurlitzer electric piano (7), tambourine (10, 14), handclaps (2)
- Dennis Wilson – lead (3, 10, 12) and backing vocals (6, 8-13), drums (3, 6, 9, 11, 12)

Additional musicians

- Ed Carter – electric guitar (1, 3, 4, 14), bass guitar (7)
- Steve Douglas – tenor (14) and baritone saxophones (1, 3), flutes (14)
- Daryl Dragon – bass guitar (5), temple blocks (5)
- Dennis Dragon – drums (5)
- Ricky Fataar – backing vocals (7), drums (7)
- Billy Hinsche – backing vocals (6), electric guitar (6, 9-11, 13), Hammond organ (7)
- Bruce Johnston – backing vocals (5), clavinet (5), reed organ (5)
- Jay Migliori – tenor and baritone saxophones (14), flutes (14)
- Marilyn Wilson – lead vocals (11)

"Good Time" horn players

- trombones – Randall Aldcroft, Michael Barone, Bob Edmondson
- trumpets – Gary Barone, Marion Childers, Chuck Findley, Steve Huffsteter
- French horns – David Duke, Arthur Maebe

Technical and production staff

- Stephen Desper – engineer on "Good Time"
- Stephen Moffitt – engineer
- Earle Mankey – engineer
- Dean Torrence – cover design
- Guy Webster – photography

== Charts ==
Chart performance for The Beach Boys Love You
Chart (1977)	Peak
Canada RPM Albums Chart	66
Swedish Album Charts	34
UK Top 40 Album Chart	28
US Billboard Top LPs & Tape	53

== Bibliography ==
- Badman, Keith (2004). The Beach Boys: The Definitive Diary of America's Greatest Band, on Stage and in the Studio. Backbeat Books. ISBN 978-0-87930-818-6.
- Cooper, Kim; Smay, David (2004). Lost in the Grooves: Scram's Capricious Guide to the Music You Missed. Routledge. ISBN 9781135879211.
- Carlin, Peter Ames (2006). Catch a Wave: The Rise, Fall, and Redemption of the Beach Boys' Brian Wilson. Rodale. ISBN 978-1-59486-320-2.
- Dillon, Mark (2012). Fifty Sides of the Beach Boys: The Songs That Tell Their Story. ECW Press. ISBN 978-1-77090-198-8.
- Doe, Andrew; Tobler, John (2004). Brian Wilson and the Beach Boys: The Complete Guide to Their Music. Omnibus. ISBN 9781844494262.
- Gaines, Steven (1986). Heroes and Villains: The True Story of The Beach Boys. New York: Da Capo Press. ISBN 0306806479.
- Leaf, David (1978). The Beach Boys and the California Myth. New York: Grosset & Dunlap. ISBN 978-0-448-14626-3.
- Love, Mike (2016). Good Vibrations: My Life as a Beach Boy. Penguin Publishing Group. ISBN 978-0-698-40886-9.
- Priore, Domenic (2005). Smile: The Story of Brian Wilson's Lost Masterpiece. London: Sanctuary. ISBN 1-86074-627-6.
- Matijas-Mecca, Christian (2017). The Words and Music of Brian Wilson. ABC-CLIO. ISBN 978-1-4408-3899-6.
- Schinder, Scott (2007). "The Beach Boys". In Schinder, Scott; Schwartz, Andy (eds.). Icons of Rock: An Encyclopedia of the Legends Who Changed Music Forever. Greenwood Press. ISBN 978-0313338458.
- Stebbins, Jon (2000). Dennis Wilson: The Real Beach Boy. ECW Press. ISBN 978-1-55022-404-7.
- Tobler, John (1978). The Beach Boys. Chartwell Books. ISBN 0890091749.
- White, Timothy (1996). The Nearest Faraway Place: Brian Wilson, the Beach Boys, and the Southern Californian Experience. Macmillan. ISBN 0333649370.
- Wilson, Brian; Gold, Todd (1991). Wouldn't It Be Nice: My Own Story. New York: HarperCollins. ISBN 978-0-06018-313-4.
- Wilson, Brian; Greenman, Ben (2016). I Am Brian Wilson: A Memoir. Da Capo Press. ISBN 978-0-306-82307-7.
