= Adult/Child =

Unreleased studio album by the Beach Boys

- Cover of the Adult/Child Sessions disc included within We Gotta Groove: The Brother Studio Years (2026)

Studio album (unreleased) by the Beach Boys
- Recorded: August 1969 – October 1976 (older recordings); February 9 – June 3, 1977 (album sessions)
- Studios: Brother (Santa Monica); Beach Boys (Los Angeles)
- Genres: Outsider; big band
- Length: 30:25
- Producer: Brian Wilson

The Beach Boys recording chronology
The Beach Boys Love You (1977)	Adult/Child (1977)	Merry Christmas from the Beach Boys (1977)

Alternative cover
- Cover of a 1985 bootleg (pictured: Wilson in 1966 during the recording of Smile)

Adult/Child (sometimes typeset as Adult Child) is an unreleased studio album by the American rock band the Beach Boys that was produced from February to June 1977. Similar to the release it was meant to follow, The Beach Boys Love You, the album is essentially a semi-autobiographical solo effort by the band's chief songwriter and producer, Brian Wilson. The title, deriving from his former psychologist Eugene Landy, referred to a theory that one's personality can be split into "adult" and "child" modes of thinking.

The track listing consisted of seven new songs, four of which feature orchestral arrangements by Dick Reynolds, along with five older tracks recorded between 1969 and 1976. Some of the new songs were recorded in a similar style as Love You; others, including "It's Over Now" and "Still I Dream of It", were originally intended to be recorded by singers such as Frank Sinatra. Initially planned for issue in September 1977, the release was vetoed due to creative dissatisfaction among the band members and the underwhelming sales of Love You. Instead, the group delivered M.I.U. Album, which shared the song "Hey Little Tomboy", albeit rerecorded.

Commentators have praised Adult/Child for its humorous and idiosyncratic "outsider" quality, also describing it as a poignant reflection of Wilson's personal life. In later years, the full album circulated widely on bootlegs. Four additional tracks saw an official release on the 1993 box set Good Vibrations. In 2026, most of the album was officially released as part of We Gotta Groove: The Brother Studio Years, an expanded reissue of Love You.

== Background ==
At the end of 1976, Brian Wilson produced The Beach Boys Love You (released in April 1977), after which he immediately moved onto the production of what became Adult/Child. Music historian Keith Badman writes that Wilson "reportedly [started the new album] on the insistence of his former doctor", Eugene Landy, who had been relieved of his services in December 1976. Wilson's 2016 memoir, I Am Brian Wilson, attributes the album's title to Landy. "He meant that there were always two parts of a personality, always an adult who wants to be in charge and a child who wants to be cared for, always an adult who thinks he knows the rules and a child who is learning and testing the rules."

Adult/Child would have been the Beach Boys' final record on Reprise, a subsidiary of Warner Records. Early in the year, band manager Stephen Love had arranged negotiations for the band to move to CBS Records once obligations to Warner had been fulfilled. Issues related to the band's recording contracts and other areas of their management plagued the group for the rest of the year.

== Recording and content ==
Adult/Child was largely recorded from February 9 to June 3, 1977 at the band's Brother Studios in Santa Monica. The songs mostly feature Brian with his brothers Dennis and Carl; contributions from Al Jardine and Mike Love were limited to recordings from earlier sessions. Dennis recorded his solo album Pacific Ocean Blue in between Adult/Child sessions at the same studio. Love and Jardine were sequestered in Switzerland and Big Sur, respectively, and so were rarely present for the recording. Earle Mankey, who had engineered 15 Big Ones and Love You, returned for Adult/Child.

Five of the 12 tracks that were to be included on Adult/Child dated from earlier recording sessions or had been rejected from earlier albums. "Games Two Can Play" and "H.E.L.P. Is On the Way" are outtakes from Sunflower (1970) and Surf's Up (1971), respectively. "Shortenin' Bread" is a traditional folk song that Brian recorded throughout the early to mid-1970s and features vocals by American Spring. "Hey Little Tomboy" and "On Broadway" are outtakes from 15 Big Ones (1976). The former had also been passed over for Love You.

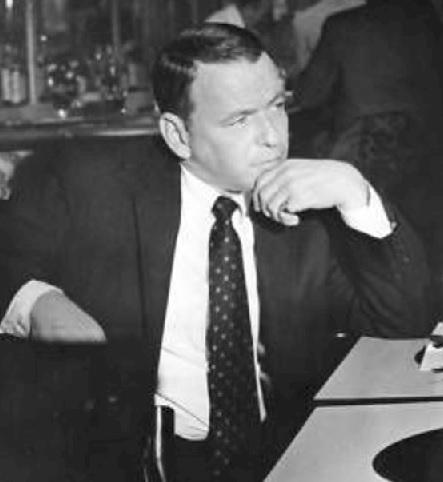
Some of the songs on Adult/Child were written with Frank Sinatra in mind.

Supplementing the outtakes were a collection of newer songs split between a big band style and others closer to the form of Love You, albeit more stripped-down. The album features prominent use of keyboards, while Brian's cigarette-damaged voice provided most of the lead vocals. Lyrically, the subject matter ranged from healthy diets and exercise to ecology. Mankey said, "[Brian]'s looking for a goal. Some of the new songs reflect his everyday situation, like 'Help Is On The Way' [sic]." Music critic Matthew Weiner called it "Brian's Sinatra album" or "Brian's 'Food Album'", wherein "one song finds the recluse staring into the mirror at his blubbery naked body—in another, he yearns to drown his sorrows in a good meal, with the whole aesthetic basically encapsulated in a fantastically Moog-y rendition of the children's song, 'Shortenin' Bread'".

Wilson commissioned Four Freshmen arranger Dick Reynolds, whom he had worked with on the Beach Boys' 1964 Christmas album, to orchestrate four tracks: "Life is for the Living", "It's Over Now", "Still I Dream of It", and "Deep Purple". The opening track, "Life Is for the Living", begins with the lines "Life is for the living / Don't sit around on your ass smoking grass / That stuff went out a long time ago!". Frank Sinatra is directly referenced in the lyrics of "It's Over Now", a song that, alongside "Still I Dream of It", was reportedly intended to be recorded by a singer such as Sinatra. (Note: Wilson claimed on different occasions that he wrote "Still I Dream of It" for either Elvis Presley or Stevie Wonder.)

Adult/Child was mixed and assembled on June 27, 1977, just days after the cancellation of a planned European summer tour by the group, on which it would have performed songs from Adult/Child. Other tracks the band recorded during these sessions were "New England Waltz" and a cover of the Spencer Davis Group's 1966 hit "Gimme Some Lovin'". (Note: During the sessions for the 1972 album Spring, Wilson had recorded another version of "Gimme Some Lovin'" in medley with the Four Tops' "Baby I Need Your Loving".)

== Cancellation ==
[Mike] told me I was fucking around, that I wasn't serious. [...] I cut a track with swing music [...] and he got mad. He said "What are you doing messing around for?" I said I'm just trying to do what I like, what I think is for now's times.

— Brian Wilson, 1988

Adult/Child was widely publicized as the Beach Boys' next release and planned for issue in September 1977. Dennis told a reporter, "[It is the] strangest album I've ever heard. [Brian]'s vocals are the best I've ever heard him. I'm elated with the new album, it's really gonna be a surprise. I don't know where it's coming from, but it's positive, again." Asked whether the album was a "contract pay-off", Carl replied, "Naah, Brian's writing great songs, more grandiose than Love You with more players." According to Stan Love, when his brother Mike was presented the songs, Mike asked Brian, "What the fuck are you doing?" Brian's 2016 memoir states, "When [Mike] heard the demos he just shook his head and stared at me."

In July 1977, Record Mirror's Samuel Graham reported that the group's rendition of "Gimme Some Lovin'" would be issued as their next single. Writing in an August article for Bay Area Music, David Leaf said that Brian had "been hard at work on a rumored solo album, as well as the next Beach Boys album" and had "finished the final mix of the latter". That month, Dennis intimated that he had desired more time to refine and record more material for the album. In October, Sam Sutherland of Record World wrote, "The folks at Warners wouldn't comment when we asked if the album had in fact been delivered to the company, as was reported to us". The band soon recorded two more albums in tandem: M.I.U. Album (1978) and the unreleased Merry Christmas from the Beach Boys.

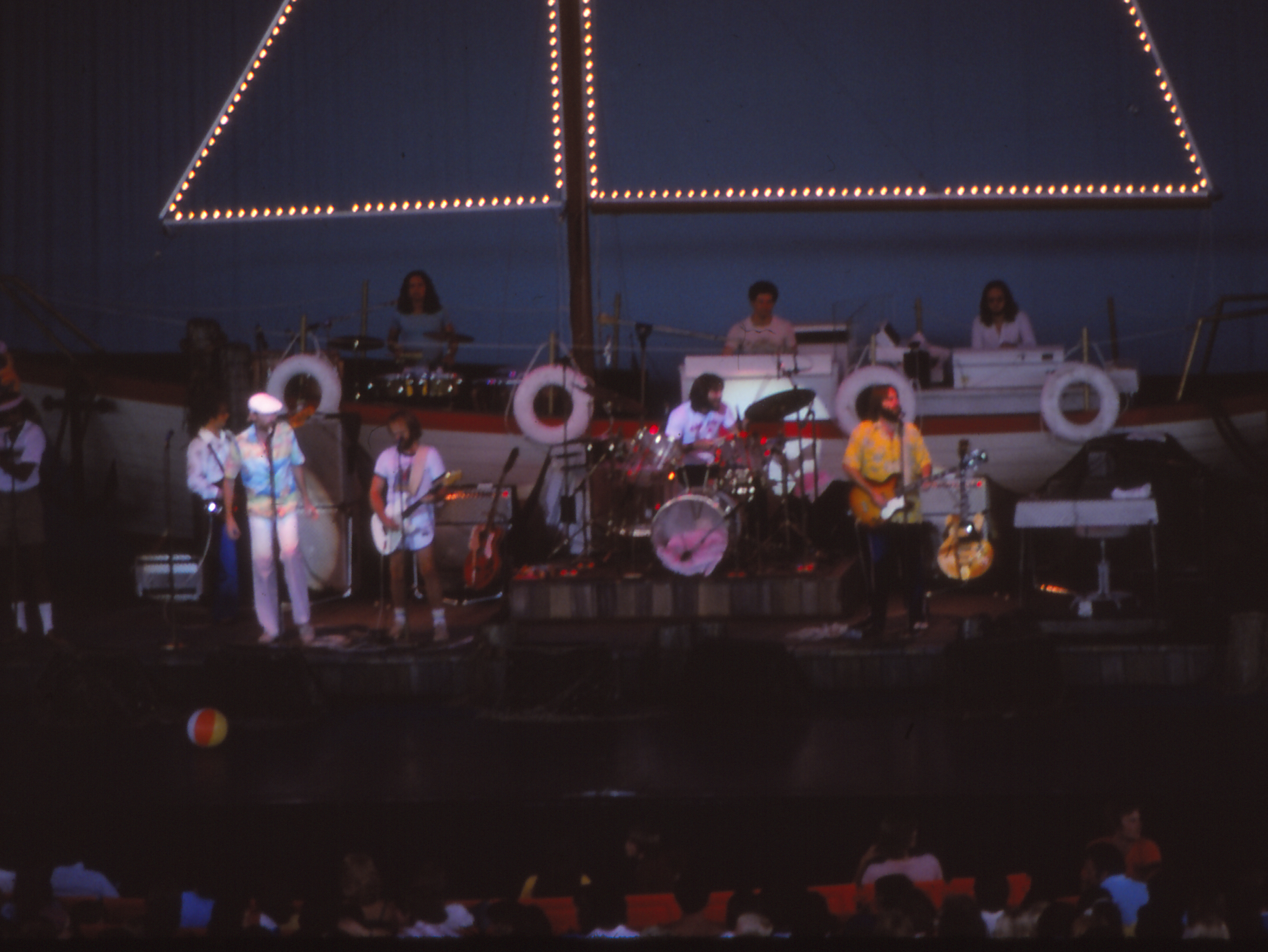
The Beach Boys performing in 1978, months after the album had been shelved.

By March 1978, Adult/Child was still planned for release. Dennis opined in a subsequent interview that he might "like Beach Boys Love You more" and, in a June article, declared that Adult/Child would not be issued. Brian's 2016 memoir says his bandmates and Warner were hesitant to release it, while Badman speculated that the group may have also wanted to save the material for a later album. (Note: In reference to the band's rejected early mixes of Sunflower, Dave Berson, then an executive at Warner, stated their record contract did not include a proviso that Warner could reject albums. Biographer Peter Ames Carlin attributed its cancellation to the commercial failure of Love You and Wilson's bandmates—particularly Love and Jardine—who felt it was "too weird" and "were the ones up in the front lines onstage every night [...] to judge what would appeal." Commenting in 2026 about the album's shelving, neither Jardine nor Love were able to recall the reason; Love said "it may not have suited the record company at the time". Jardine speculated, "Mike would probably have thought that maybe we should stay with the formula.") Band archivist Howie Edelson attributed its cancellation to Love You's lack of mainstream success and fears that the follow-up would "alienate" fans with its inconsistent and overdiversified material, surmising that "everybody kind of realized that, that although this is a collection of songs — and, albeit, some brilliant — it's not an album."

== Partial releases ==
Two tracks were rerecorded for the band's following albums: "Hey Little Tomboy" on M.I.U. Album and "Shortenin' Bread" on L.A. (Light Album) (1979). Several more tracks appeared on subsequent Beach Boys compilations and the album itself circulated widely on bootlegs and unauthorized YouTube uploads.

The original Adult/Child mixes of "H.E.L.P. Is On the Way", "Games Two Can Play", "It's Over Now", and "Still I Dream of It" were included on the 1993 box set Good Vibrations: Thirty Years of the Beach Boys. A piano demo of "Still I Dream of It" was included on Wilson's 1995 album I Just Wasn't Made for These Times. An alternate mix of "It's Over Now" was included on the 2013 compilation Made in California.

In 2026, the remaining unreleased tracks (with the exception of the original version of "Hey Little Tomboy") were released on We Gotta Groove: The Brother Studio Years, an expanded reissue of Love You.

== Critical reception ==
Professional ratings
Review scores
Source	Rating
Stylus Magazine	B

In his 1978 biography The Beach Boys and the California Myth, David Leaf was generally unfavorable toward Love You and Adult/Child, though he enjoyed "It's Over Now" and "Still I Dream of It", calling them "the most personal tunes Brian has recorded since ''Til I Die.'" Catch a Wave author Peter Ames Carlin called "Hey Little Tomboy" "the worst" of the Adult/Child songs and "the most unsettling" of the Beach Boys' recording history. Musicologist Philip Lambert rated each of the songs as "solid efforts, but 'Still I Dream of It' and 'It's Over Now' are particularly inspired and rank right up there with Brian's best work."

Stylus Magazine included Adult/Child in its 2003 list of "The Classic Rock Lost Album Archetypes" among other unreleased Beach Boys work such as Smile, Landlocked, and Bambu in "A Lost Album Category Unto Themselves"; contributor Matthew Weiner deemed it "a must-hear" and found that "Wilson's melodic sense, arranging skills and humor" had remained intact, "even if his choirboy voice, ravaged by a four-pack-a-day cigarette habit, had [not]." Billboard contributor Morgan Enos rued in 2018, "A couple of the tunes stand up to any ballad on Pet Sounds, and others, like 'Hey! Little Tomboy''s [sic] creepy leering at a girl who throws out her skateboard and 'shaves her legs,' mostly reflect Wilson's declining mental state."

Writing in 2004, critic Robert Dayton deemed Adult/Child to be one of the Beach Boys' best 1970s albums and lamented its "tight-arsed naysayers", calling both Love You and Adult/Child a "showcase of a truly original mix of humor and sadness [...] dealing with simple lyrical themes that make you wonder why they had never been explored before. [...] All of the songs are infectiously catchy, including the ballads, which are possibly the saddest ballads known to humankind." In his 2008 book The Rough Guide to the Best Music You've Never Heard, Nigel Williamson praised the album's "quirky charm and goofy unpredictability".

Following the release of We Gotta Groove, David Fricke wrote in his review for Mojo that Adult/Child had suffered from a "lack of direction" despite "moments of genius, in excelsis." AllMusic's Tim Sendra felt the album succeeded as "a fine companion to Love You's home-cooked charm", while Ultimate Classic Rock's Michael Gallucci called it "a fascinating missing piece to the puzzle and a final burst of creative energy".

== Track listing ==
All tracks are written by Brian Wilson, except where noted.

Side one
No.	Title	Lead vocal(s)	Length
1.	"Life Is for the Living"	Carl Wilson and Brian Wilson	1:52
2.	"Hey Little Tomboy"	Mike Love, B. Wilson, and C. Wilson	2:20
3.	"Deep Purple" (Peter Derose, Mitchell Parish)	B. Wilson	2:24
4.	"H.E.L.P. Is On the Way" (B. Wilson, Love)	Love	2:30
5.	"It's Over Now"	C. Wilson, B. Wilson, and Marilyn Wilson	2:50
6.	"Everybody Wants to Live"	C. Wilson and B. Wilson	3:10

Side two
No.	Title	Lead vocal(s)	Length
1.	"Shortenin' Bread" (traditional, arranged by B. Wilson)	B. Wilson and C. Wilson	2:48
2.	"Lines"	B. Wilson and C. Wilson	1:44
3.	"On Broadway" (Barry Mann, Cynthia Weil, Jerry Leiber, Mike Stoller)	Al Jardine	3:11
4.	"Games Two Can Play"	B. Wilson	2:01
5.	"It's Trying to Say" (also unofficially known as "Baseball's On")	Dennis Wilson	2:10
6.	"Still I Dream of It"	B. Wilson	3:26
Total length:			30:25

Notes

- Lead vocals sourced from Badman.
- Some bootlegs include bonus tracks that were recorded by the group between the 1960s and 1980s.

== Personnel ==
Partial credits from Badman, sessionographer Craig Slowinski, Phillip Lambert, and Stylus magazine.

The Beach Boys

- Brian Wilson - vocals, Hammond organ, bass, bass drum, tambourine, handclaps, Moog synthesizer
- Mike Love - vocals
- Al Jardine - vocals, banjo
- Carl Wilson - vocals, electric guitar
- Dennis Wilson - vocals

Additional musicians and production staff

- Bruce Johnston - vocals
- Marilyn Wilson - vocals
- Diane Rovell - vocals
- Daryl Dragon - tack piano

== See also ==
- The Beach Boys bootleg recordings
- Sweet Insanity

== Bibliography ==
- Badman, Keith (2004). The Beach Boys: The Definitive Diary of America's Greatest Band, on Stage and in the Studio. Backbeat Books. ISBN 978-0-87930-818-6.
- Carlin, Peter Ames (2006). Catch a Wave: The Rise, Fall, and Redemption of the Beach Boys' Brian Wilson. Rodale. ISBN 978-1-59486-320-2.
- Dayton, Robert (2004). "Adult Child". In Cooper, Kim; Smay, David (eds.). Lost in the Grooves: Scram's Capricious Guide to the Music You Missed. Routledge. ISBN 9781135879211.
- Gaines, Steven (1986). Heroes and Villains: The True Story of The Beach Boys. New York: Da Capo Press. ISBN 0306806479.
- Lambert, Philip (2007). Inside the Music of Brian Wilson: the Songs, Sounds, and Influences of the Beach Boys' Founding Genius. Continuum. ISBN 978-0-8264-1876-0.
- Leaf, David (1978). The Beach Boys and the California Myth. New York: Grosset & Dunlap. ISBN 978-0-448-14626-3.
- McCulley, Jerry (1997) [1988]. "Trouble in Mind – A Revealing Interview with Brian Wilson". In Abbott, Kingsley (ed.). Back to the Beach: A Brian Wilson and the Beach Boys Reader (1st ed.). London: Helter Skelter. pp. 187–204. ISBN 978-1900924023.
- White, Timothy (1996). The Nearest Faraway Place: Brian Wilson, the Beach Boys, and the Southern Californian Experience. Macmillan. ISBN 0333649370.
- Williamson, Nigel (2008). The Rough Guide to the Best Music You've Never Heard. London: Rough Guides. ISBN 9781848360037.
- Wilson, Brian; Greenman, Ben (2016). I Am Brian Wilson: A Memoir. Da Capo Press. ISBN 978-0-306-82307-7.
