= Johnny Carson (song) =

Song by the Beach Boys

from the album The Beach Boys Love You
- Released: April 11, 1977
- Recorded: 1976
- Studio: Brother Studios, Santa Monica, California
- Length: 2:47
- Label: Brother/Reprise
- Songwriter: Brian Wilson
- Producer: Brian Wilson

Licensed audio
- "Johnny Carson" on YouTube

"Johnny Carson" is a song by American rock band the Beach Boys from their 1977 album The Beach Boys Love You. It was written by Brian Wilson as a tribute to one of his idols, Johnny Carson. The recording features Mike Love on lead vocals, accompanied by an arrangement of synthesizers, organ, and piano.

== Inspiration and lyrics ==
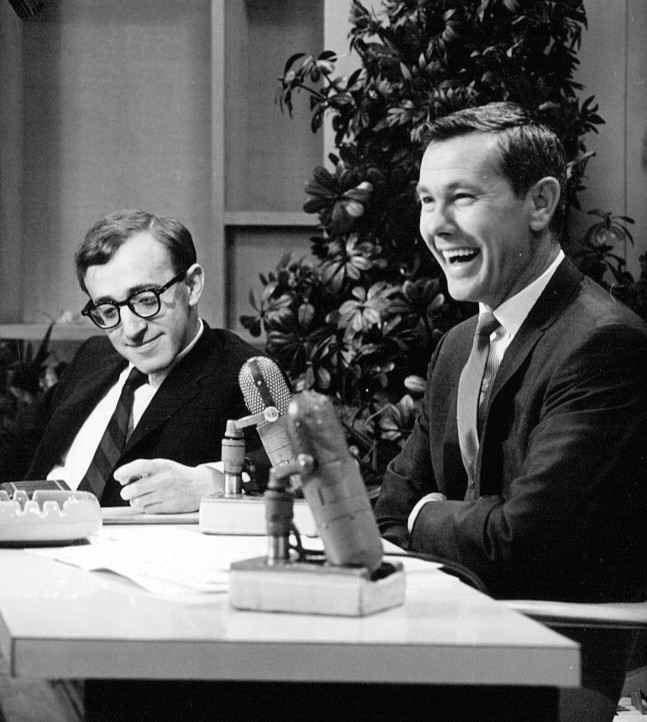
"Johnny Carson" was written about the host of The Tonight Show (pictured on right, 1964, with Woody Allen)

"Johnny Carson" expresses admiration for the host of the late-night television talk show, The Tonight Show Starring Johnny Carson, and extols his ability to be a consistent entertainer. In 1977, Wilson wrote of the origins for the song:

One morning I was on my way to the studio and I'd been thinking about how I'd seen Johnny on TV the night before and I said to myself, "Goddamn it! There's gotta be some song about Johnny Carson!" I mean, he's been an idol of so many people for so many years and why not a song about Johnny Carson?! So I said, "Fer Chrissakes!" When I got to the studio I sat down and goddamn cranked out a song about him. I'm definitely a fan.

Conversely, in a later interview, Wilson explained that he wrote the song after overhearing another person in the room talk about Carson. "I told them I was gonna write a song about him and they didn't believe me. I had the whole thing done in twenty minutes."

Wilson's 1991 memoir, Wouldn't It Be Nice: My Own Story, credits the impetus for the song to his psychologist, Eugene Landy. It states that Landy suggested and helped Wilson write a song about Carson in order for Wilson to overcome his fear of appearing on The Tonight Show.

Biographer Peter Ames Carlin felt that the song resembled "a musical vision of a factory", elaborating "This guy's like a factory of brilliance as far as [Brian is] concerned. Just cranks it out [...] which is what Brian has been told to do for his entire adult life. [...] So he's giving it up to the guy who can really do it without losing his mind."

== Critical reception ==
Carlin referred to the track as the album's "pivot point", one that "separates the normal from the freakishly bizarre." Biographers Andrew Doe and John Tobler similarly write, "By now, the listener has either thrown the disc out of the nearest window, or is dancing around the room shouting 'yes, yes, more, more!!' It's that kind of track on that kind of album."

== Carson's reaction ==
Asked about the song in a 1979 interview, Carson answered, "Sure I heard it. Someone sent it over to the office. I don't think it was a big seller. I think they just did it for the fun of it. It was not a work of art."

== Personnel ==
Per archivists John Brode, Will Crerar, Joshilyn Hoisington, and Craig Slowinski.

The Beach Boys

- Al Jardine – backing vocals
- Mike Love – lead and backing vocals
- Brian Wilson – backing vocals, grand piano, Hammond organ, Minimoog bass, drums
- Carl Wilson – lead and backing vocals

Additional musician

- Ed Carter – electric guitars
