= I Wanna Pick You Up =

Song by the Beach Boys

from the album The Beach Boys Love You
- Released: April 11, 1977
- Recorded: October 13, 1976
- Studio: Brother Studios, Santa Monica, California
- Length: 2:39
- Label: Brother/Reprise
- Songwriter: Brian Wilson
- Producer: Brian Wilson

Licensed audio
- "I Wanna Pick You Up" on YouTube

"I Wanna Pick You Up" is a song by American rock band the Beach Boys from their 1977 album The Beach Boys Love You. It was written by Brian Wilson and features lead vocals from Dennis Wilson.

== Lyrics ==
Wilson wrote "I Want to Pick You Up" about his daughter Carnie. In 1977, he offered the song as an example of how he had "worked specifically at getting the lyrics right" for the Love You album and described the lyrics as about "a man who considers this chick a baby. [...] she's too big to pick up, of course. But he wants to; he wants to pretend she's small like a baby: He really wants to pick her up!"

At the end of the song, the singer instructs the listener to "pat, pat, pat her on her butt, butt / She's gone to sleep, be quiet". Times-Georgian contributor Alex McGill states that the song conveys "a fatherly love for his child", although biographer Peter Ames Carlin interpreted it as about "either a disturbingly sexualized infant or a dismayingly infantilized adult."

== Recording ==
"I Wanna Pick You Up" was tracked on October 13, 1976, at Brother Studios. Dennis Wilson sings the majority of the lead vocals on the song with brother Brian joining him on the second half of the verses and the chorus.

== Personnel ==
Per archivists John Brode, Will Crerar, Joshilyn Hoisington and Craig Slowinski

The Beach Boys

- Brian Wilson – lead and backing vocals, grand and tack pianos, Mellotron, Minimoog
- Carl Wilson – backing vocals, 12-string electric guitar, electric guitar
- Dennis Wilson – lead and backing vocals, drums

== Cover versions ==
- In the 1990s, the song was covered by Darian Sahanaja in the production style of Pet Sounds with an introductory keyboard arrangement similar to the opening of The Beach Boys' "You Still Believe In Me," and an ending with vocal harmonies borrowed from a "Heroes And Villains" outtake that were eventually used on the Brian Wilson Presents Smile version of the song. Sahanaja's cover of "I Wanna Pick You Up" was released as a b-side of the Brian Wilson penned "Do You Have Any Regrets". The single was pressed on blue vinyl with a label parodying X Records, the label that released The Beach Boys' first single, "Surfin'".
- In 2000 the song was covered by Alex Chilton for the compilation album Caroline Now!.
