= Hey Little Tomboy =

Single by the Beach Boys

from the album M.I.U. Album
- A-side: "Peggy Sue"
- Released: August 28, 1978
- Recorded: October 1976–1978
- Genre: Rock
- Length: 2:27
- Songwriter: Brian Wilson
- Producer: Brian Wilson

The Beach Boys singles chronology
"Honkin' Down the Highway" (1977)	"Hey Little Tomboy" (1978)	"Here Comes the Night" (1979)

"Hey Little Tomboy" is a song by American rock band the Beach Boys from their 1978 album M.I.U. Album. Written by Brian Wilson, the lyrics describe a young tomboy who is persuaded to embrace her femininity. It was initially planned to be included as a track on The Beach Boys Love You (1977) and subsequently the unreleased album Adult/Child. It was also issued as the B-side to the M.I.U. Album single "Peggy Sue".

== Background ==
Early recording sessions for "Hey Little Tomboy" were held in August and October 1976 at the band's Brother Studios. The song was initially a contender for the Love You track list. Wilson said in a November 1976 interview: "It's about a little girl who is sort of a roughneck, and this guy convinces her to become a pretty girl, and sure enough she slowly turns into a pretty—she starts shaving her legs and wearing short skirts—puts lipstick on and makeup. So she's a little tomboy. We're very happy with it."

== Reception ==
"Hey Little Tomboy" drew no controversy when originally released on M.I.U. Album in 1978; The Surburban contributor Joel Goldenberg reported that it had become the band's "most controversial song" in later years, opining "the music is light and breezy and the song is of its time" and possibly inspired by the Peanuts tomboy character Peppermint Patty. In the album's 2000 liner notes, music critic Jeff Tamarkin wrote that the song "is politically incorrect in every way by modern standards, yet its innocence and simplicity are undeniably charming". Biographer Peter Ames Carlin interpreted the song as depicting a young girl becoming physically intimate with a suitor portrayed by Mike Love, calling it "the most unsettling moment in the entire recorded history of the Beach Boys."

== Personnel ==
Credits are sourced from Craig Slowinski, John Brode, Will Crerar, Joshilyn Hoisington, and David Beard.

The Beach Boys

- Al Jardine - possible bass guitar
- Mike Love - lead vocals
- Brian Wilson - lead and backing vocals, tack piano
- Carl Wilson - lead and backing vocals, electric guitar
- Dennis Wilson - backing vocals, drums

Additional Musicians

- Ron Altbach - vibraphone
- Ed Carter - possible bass guitar
- Gary Griffin - Minimoog
- Mike Kowalski - drums, sleigh bells, guiro, shakers

== Cover versions ==
- 2003 – BMX Bandits with Pearlfishers

== See also ==
- "All Dressed Up for School"
- "Smart Girls"
