= Mount Vernon and Fairway =

EP by the Beach Boys
- Released: January 8, 1973
- Recorded: 1972
- Studios: BBC 2 (Baambrugge, Utrecht, Netherlands)
- Genre: Fairy tale
- Length: 12:05
- Label: Brother/Reprise
- Producer: The Beach Boys

The Beach Boys EPs chronology
Four by the Beach Boys (1964)	Mount Vernon and Fairway (1973)	1969: I'm Going Your Way (2019)

Mount Vernon and Fairway (subtitled A Fairy Tale) is an EP by the American rock band the Beach Boys that was included as a bonus record with their 1973 release Holland. It is a 12-minute musical fairy tale, primarily composed by Brian Wilson, assembled by Carl Wilson, and narrated by manager Jack Rieley. Brian provided the voice of the Pied Piper and drew the sleeve cover.

== Storyline ==
Mount Vernon and Fairway tells the story of a Pied Piper who lives inside a glowing transistor radio owned by a family of royalty. He introduces magical music to the young princes and princesses but disappears forever once they stop believing in his existence.

== Background ==
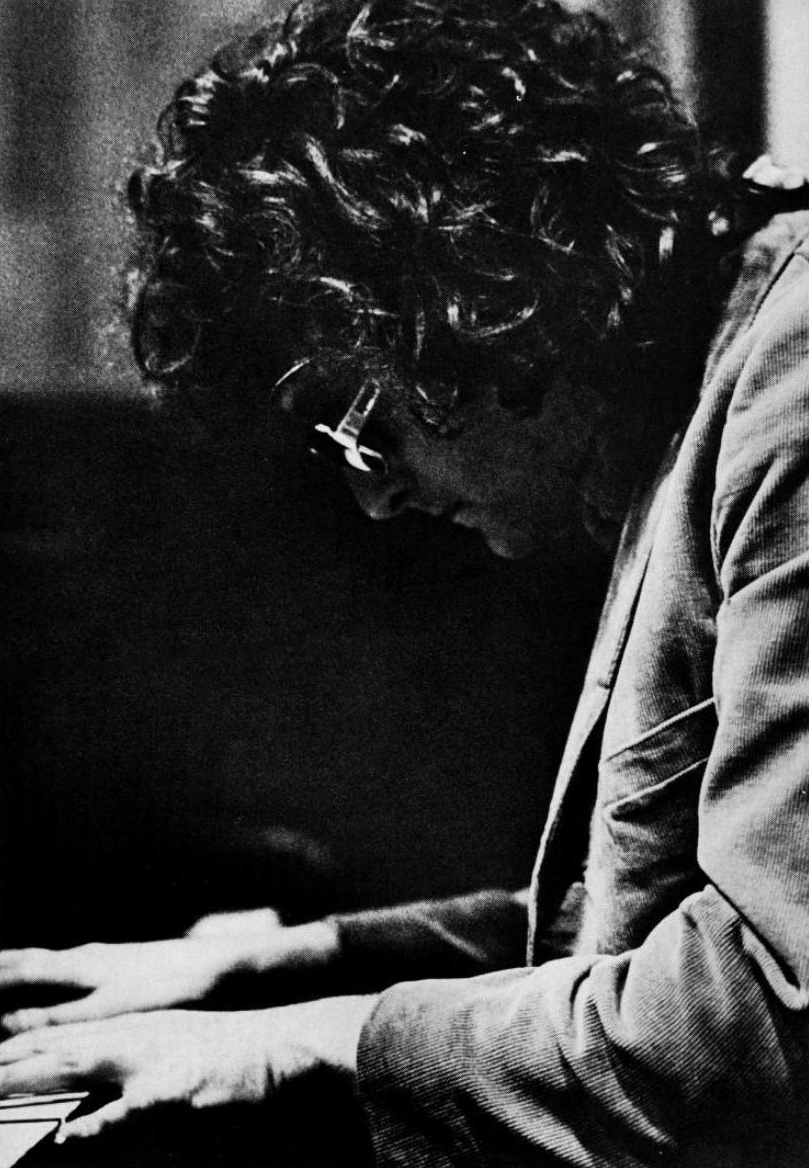
Mount Vernon and Fairway was heavily influenced by Randy Newman's 1972 album Sail Away.

In the summer of 1972, Wilson joined his bandmates when they temporarily moved base to Holland and recorded the basic tracks for the album of the same name. While living in a Dutch house called "the Flowers" and listening repeatedly to Randy Newman's newest album Sail Away, Wilson was inspired to write a fairy tale that was loosely based on his memories listening to the radio at Mike Love's family home as a teenager. Wilson said that he listened to Sail Away "over and over" while physically writing down the lyrics that became the fairy tale.

I just sat around and drank apple sap ... and dreamed. And one night I was ... sitting there with a pencil and I started writing. And I found that if I kept playing the Randy Newman album, I could still stay in that mood. It was the weirdest thing; I wrote the whole fairy tale while listening to that album. It was the weirdest little mood I created. I was thinking about Mike Love's house, and I just wrote, "There was a mansion on a hill," and then later on, in my head, I created a fairy tale.

His 2016 memoir, I Am Brian Wilson, shares further details:

My first concept of the piece, which I thought of as a fairy tale, was much more ambitious. The six sections would be linked by a fairy-tale theme, and I wanted to cut new arrangements of some of the songs we used to hear on our transistor radios in the late '50s, like "A Casual Look." They would be interspersed throughout. It would be a whole trip about the group. I even had my imitation of Mike’s dad in there, yelling at Mike’s brother, Stan.

Asked about Mount Vernon and Fairway in a 2013 interview, manager Jack Rieley commented,

That was nuts. Brian was in Holland with his family, including his girls, Carnie and Wendy. They were quite little and had rubber stamps for each letter of the alphabet. Brian started writing this fairytale with the rubber stamps, which was a bit sketchy to say the least. He vowed to me he’d have the fairytale ready for him to perform by a certain date, which came and went. We extended it… again, the song still wasn't ready. Eventually, I found out only about half of the fairytale had been written. Brian backed out of performing it. He, Carl and Dennis ganged up on me and persuaded me to do it. I not only did it but I had to ad lib the part that Brian didn't finish!

Wilson later recycled the melody of "Better Get Back In Bed" for his unreleased song "Lazy Lizzie". Likewise, one of the early versions of "Ding Dang" has a riff similar to "I'm the Pied Piper". "Better Get Back in Bed" stemmed from the unreleased Holland outtake "Pa, Let Her Go Out".

== Recording and release ==
Titled "Mount Vernon and Fairway", it is a post-Sartre essay on the nothingness of being, carrying with it a joy and exaltation which evaporates time as nothing Brian Wilson has ever attempted before. It is not a rock opera, so it will disappoint some and insult perhaps a few listeners.

— Excerpt from the 12-page booklet packaged with Holland

According to Wilson, due to the fairy tale's relatively long length, the group rejected it for inclusion on Holland. He recalled that when he proposed the concept to the group, "Nobody was ready for that. Nobody. I remember, Carl said, 'WHAT?'" Rieley remembered, "I was very weirded out by that little suite! I was not enthusiastic about it. That was one situation in which Brian Wilson insisted that the song be a part of the album."

Wilson said that he subsequently "got fucked up" and "depressed", leaving Carl to do "all the editing on it and even did part of it himself when I wasn't there." Ultimately, as a compromise, Carl proposed that Mount Vernon and Fairway instead be released as a bonus EP packaged with Holland.

Mike Love's account differed. "Brian thought up the idea of the fairy tale in Holland, and we all thought it was great how the whole thing came together. We all loved working on it, and from the start we thought it made a great little 'present' to go with the album, so that's what we did."

An instrumental version of Mount Vernon and Fairway without narration appears on the 1993 box set Good Vibrations: Thirty Years of The Beach Boys.

== Proposed follow-up ==
Journalist Brian Chidester reported the existence of a cassette tape, given by Wilson to photographer Ed Roach, that reveals Wilson's plans for a second fairy tale. "According to Roach, the recording features Wilson reciting a narrative about two young girls who get lost in the woods on their way to school. Wilson’s daughters, Carnie and Wendy, play the roles of the young girls over a cute musical track."

== "Mt Vernon Farewell" ==
In 2021, Wilson included a piano reworking of the fairy tale, titled "Mt Vernon Farewell", on his album At My Piano.

== Track listing ==
All narration by Jack Rieley, except "Magic Transistor Radio", which was narrated by Rieley and Brian Wilson.

Side one
No.	Title	Writer(s)	Length
1.	"Mt. Vernon and Fairway – Theme"	Brian Wilson	1:34
2.	"I'm the Pied Piper – Instrumental"	B. Wilson; Carl Wilson	2:20
3.	"Better Get Back in Bed"	B. Wilson	1:39
4.	"Magic Transistor Radio"	B. Wilson	1:43

Side two
No.	Title	Writer(s)	Length
1.	"I'm the Pied Piper"	B. Wilson; C. Wilson	2:09
2.	"Radio King Dom"	B. Wilson; Jack Rieley	2:38
Total length:			12:05

== Personnel ==
Credits from Craig Slowinski, John Brode, Will Crerar and Joshilyn Hoisington. Track 1 is replayed several times, while track 5 is replayed near the end of track 6.

The Beach Boys

- Al Jardine - backing vocals (2, 5, 6)
- Mike Love - backing vocals (2, 5, 6)
- Brian Wilson - lead (4) and backing vocals (2, 3, 5, 6); whistling (2, 5); narration (4); upright (1–3, 5, 6) and tack pianos (2, 5); Hammond organ (3); Moog synthesizer (1–3, 5); Wurlitzer electric pianos (4); bass drum (3)
- Carl Wilson - lead (3, 4) and backing vocals (2, 5, 6); whistling (2, 5); electric slide guitar (1, 3); 12-string electric guitar (3); Hammond organ (1); Wurlitzer electric piano (2, 5); bass guitar (4); cymbal (6)
- Dennis Wilson - backing vocals (2, 5, 6)

Additional Personnel

- Jack Rieley - narration (all tracks)
- John Roos - crickets

The remaining sound effects could not be identified.

== Bibliography ==
- Badman, Keith (2004). The Beach Boys: The Definitive Diary of America's Greatest Band, on Stage and in the Studio. Backbeat Books. ISBN 978-0-87930-818-6.
- Benoit, Shelley (1997) [1973]. "Holland: The Making of an Album". In Abbott, Kingsley (ed.). Back to the Beach: A Brian Wilson and the Beach Boys Reader (1st ed.). London: Helter Skelter. pp. 89–98. ISBN 978-1900924023.
- Carlin, Peter Ames (2006). Catch a Wave: The Rise, Fall, and Redemption of the Beach Boys' Brian Wilson. Rodale. ISBN 978-1-59486-320-2.
- Gaines, Steven (1986). Heroes and Villains: The True Story of The Beach Boys. New York: Da Capo Press. ISBN 0306806479.
- Tobler, John (1978). The Beach Boys. Chartwell Books. ISBN 0890091749.
- White, Timothy (1996). The Nearest Faraway Place: Brian Wilson, the Beach Boys, and the Southern Californian Experience. Macmillan. ISBN 0333649370.
- Wilson, Brian; Greenman, Ben (2016). I Am Brian Wilson: A Memoir. Da Capo Press. ISBN 978-0-306-82307-7.
