= Solar System (song) =

Single by the Beach Boys

from the album The Beach Boys Love You
- A-side: "Honkin' Down the Highway"
- Released: May 30, 1977
- Recorded: October 1976 – January 1977
- Length: 2:47
- Label: Brother
- Songwriter: Brian Wilson
- Producer: Brian Wilson

The Beach Boys singles chronology
"Everyone's in Love with You" (1976)	"Solar System" (1977)	"Peggy Sue" (1978)

"Solar System" is a song by the American rock band the Beach Boys from their 1977 album The Beach Boys Love You. It was written and sung by Brian Wilson, accompanied by his bandmates, and is the only track on the album in which he performed all of the instrumentation.

== Background ==
The lyrics discuss the Solar System in a similar vein as the band's 1965 hit "California Girls". In "Solar System", the narrator asks, "What do the planets mean? / And have you ever seen / sunrise in the mornin'? / It shined when you were born".

Wilson stated in a 1977 interview that he conceived some of the lyrics while driving to a parents' meeting at his daughters' school. He explained that he had looked up at the sky and started thinking about the Solar System. "It's just something that came into my mind. Later on, I developed it into the song; I didn't come up with the title that night but I wrote the words in the car." In 1995, he gave a similar account and added that, when he got home, he finished the song on his piano, exclaiming, "This is a gr-eat song! These lyrics are great. This melody is great. (whistles) I've got a beauty here!" He then named it one of his favorites on The Beach Boys Love You, adding, "When I'm 90, I'm gonna be as proud of that song as I am now."

In 2007, Wilson offered a different recollection of the song's genesis, saying that the song was written in his head while he was attending a weekly astrology class at UCLA.

Trish Campo, former chief administrator of Brother Studios, recalled Brian at the studio sitting at a Hammond B-3 organ, absently gazing at the giant circular stained glass window over him depicting planets and stars. Later that afternoon, Campo heard "Solar System" coming out of the studio.

== Reception ==
Music critic Robert Christgau praised "Solar System" as "impossible to shake", and characterized by a "silliness that registered as charming".

== Personnel ==
Per archivists John Brode, Will Crerar, Joshilyn Hoisington, and Craig Slowinski.

The Beach Boys

- Al Jardine – backing vocals
- Mike Love – backing vocals
- Brian Wilson – lead and backing vocals, grand and tack pianos, Hammond organ, ARP String Ensemble, Minimoog, snare drum, tubular bells
- Dennis Wilson – backing vocals
