= Honkin' Down the Highway =

Single by the Beach Boys

from the album The Beach Boys Love You
- B-side: "Solar System"
- Released: May 30, 1977
- Recorded: 1976–1977
- Genre: Rock and roll
- Length: 2:48
- Label: Brother
- Songwriter: Brian Wilson
- Producer: Brian Wilson

The Beach Boys singles chronology
"Susie Cincinnati" (1976)	"Honkin' Down the Highway" (1977)	"Peggy Sue" (1978)

"Honkin' Down the Highway" is a song by American rock band the Beach Boys from their 1977 album The Beach Boys Love You. It was written by Brian Wilson and sung by Al Jardine. The lyrics describe a man driving to a woman, at her family's behest, for an engagement that the narrator states will conclude with their "Takin' one little inch at a time, now / 'Til we're feelin' fine, now".

== Background and recording ==
Asked if the song was influenced by country music, Wilson responded, "It was to a certain degree – but just to a certain degree though. I remember when I wrote that I was thinkin' 'truckin' down the highway' – just some kind of a country western kind of an idea. The actual song itself wasn't that country though."

The song was originally going to be sung by touring musician Billy Hinsche. Hinsche later said that Eugene Landy had convinced Wilson to discard the lead vocal that Hinsche had recorded.

Engineer Earle Mankey recalled that Wizzard frontman Roy Wood contributed to the recording.

An edited version appeared on the 1991 CD reissue of The Beach Boys Love You, in which the drum intro is cut off.

== Single mix ==
The German single mix runs shorter than the album release, cutting the instrumental bridge.

== Reception ==
Cash Box said of the single, "the vocals and darkly colored instruments are blended into one thick soup, but the warm summer feelings come through." Record World called it a "rock-ribbed driving song.."

== Cover versions ==
- In the mid-1980s, Alex Chilton played "Honkin' Down the Highway" in concert with revised lyrics.
- A remake of this song was included on Jardine's 2010 album A Postcard from California, with Brian Wilson making a guest appearance.

== Personnel ==
Per archivists John Brode, Will Crerar, Joshilyn Hoisington and Craig Slowinski.

The Beach Boys

- Al Jardine – lead vocals
- Brian Wilson – backing vocals, grand pianos, clavinet, ARP String Ensemble, Minimoog bass
- Dennis Wilson – backing vocals, drums

Additional musician

- Billy Hinsche – backing vocals, electric guitars
