= Dick Reynolds (musician) =

American musician, songwriter, and arranger (1923–1988)

- Birth name: Richard Eastis Reynolds
- Occupations: Songwriter; arranger; conductor; musician
- Instrument: Trombone
- Formerly of: The Dick Reynolds Orchestra, The Four Freshmen, The Ray Anthony Orchestra

Richard Eastis Reynolds was an American musician, bandleader, songwriter, conductor and trombonist who was an arranger for The Four Freshmen.

He also arranged for Frank Sinatra and authored "If I Ever Love Again", which Sinatra recorded in 1949.

Brian Wilson of the Beach Boys said of Reynolds: "[He's] just about a god to me. His work is the greatest, and the Freshmen's execution is too much." Reynolds was later employed by Wilson for the recording of The Beach Boys' Christmas Album (1964) and Adult/Child (unreleased, 1977).

== As songwriter ==
- "Silver Threads and Golden Needles", 1956 single written with Jack Rhodes
- "Sweet Talk", single for Boots Randolph, written with Gene Fiocca
