= Sherry She Needs Me =

Song written by Brian Wilson and Russ Titelman

Song by the Beach Boys

from the album Made in California
- Written: 1965
- Released: August 27, 2013
- Recorded: 1965, 1976
- Label: Capitol
- Songwriters: Brian Wilson; Russ Titelman
- Producer: Brian Wilson

"She Says That She Needs Me"

Song by Brian Wilson

from the album Imagination
- Released: June 16, 1998
- Recorded: 1998
- Genre: Ballad
- Label: Giant
- Songwriters: Brian Wilson; Russ Titelman; Carole Bayer Sager
- Producers: Brian Wilson; Joe Thomas

"Sherry She Needs Me" (also known as "Sandy" or "Sandy She Needs Me") is a song written in 1965 by Brian Wilson and Russ Titelman for the American rock band the Beach Boys. The recording was not released until decades later. As a solo artist in 1998, Wilson completed the song with lyric changes by Carole Bayer Sager; it was renamed "She Says That She Needs Me" and released on his album Imagination.

A tender and poignant love ballad, AllMusic cited "She Says That She Needs Me" as one of the finest tracks on Imagination, writing: "this song captures Wilson's unique and heartfelt balladeer style with extreme effectiveness. The melody is one of Wilson's most beautiful, and this arrangement (loaded with tasteful yet dramatic horns and strings) clearly bears this out. A dramatic, minor-key bridge only adds to the lushness. Lyrically, it's also a great example of Wilson's literate, artless style."

== Background ==
The song began as one of two collaborations between Brian Wilson and Russ Titelman during the mid-1960s, the other being "Guess I'm Dumb" which was successfully recorded and released as a single by Glen Campbell.

== Recording ==
The song was initiated during sessions for the Beach Boys' 1965 album Summer Days (And Summer Nights!!). Two versions of the instrumental were recorded with the name "Sandy" or "Sandy She Needs Me". After rough vocals were added on one of these instrumentals, the track lay dormant for several years. Sometime in August 1970, the master tape was transferred from three-track tape to 16-track, although there exists no evidence of any overdubs recorded at that time. On August 21, 1976, Brian retrieved the track, renamed it "Sherry She Needs Me", and overdubbed a lead vocal shortly before sessions for the group's 1977 album Love You. According to archivist Craig Slownski, "While the lead vocal starts out gruff, it eventually soars, proving that even in 1976 Brian was capable of near-crystal shattering 1965-style falsetto singing, when he felt like it." It was abandoned once again after being briefly considered for inclusion in an early track listing for the ultimately rejected Adult/Child LP.

In 1978, the song was rewritten and rerecorded as "Tricia" with lead vocals by Mike Love for his scrapped solo album First Love, and remains unreleased. Titelman reportedly "took another stab" at "Sherry She Needs Me" with Brian as they worked together on his 1988 debut solo album Brian Wilson, renaming it "Terry She Needs Me".

== Release ==
Brian revisited the song a final time in 1998, when it was completed as "She Says That She Needs Me" with modified lyrics by Carole Bayer Sager on the album Imagination.

In 2013, the song was released in a digitally altered form for the group's box set Made in California. It mashed up the unfinished vocals by Brian overdubbed in 1976 with Beach Boys vocals from an alternate 1965 take. Compiler Mark Linett elaborated "That’s a 1965 instrumental track with a 1976 vocal. They were considering finishing the song and putting it on the Love You album. It got as far as Brian adding a lead vocal. That’s happened a lot where they go back to a song from years ago."

== Personnel ==
- Brian Wilson — lead, harmony and backing vocals

"Sandy She Needs Me"

Sourced from Musician's Union AFM contract sheets and surviving session audio, documented by Craig Slowinski.

- Jimmy Bond – acoustic bass
- Roy Caton – trumpet
- Jerry Cole – twelve-string guitar
- Steve Douglas – tenor saxophone
- Steve Dvoreck – vibraphone
- Al De Lory – Baldwin electric harpsichord
- Bill Green – alto saxophone
- Carol Kaye – bass guitar
- Jay Migliori – baritone saxophone
- Jack Nimitz – bass saxophone
- Earl Palmer – drums, timbale
- Howard Roberts – guitar
- Leon Russell – grand piano
- Billy Strange – tambourine
- Carl Wilson – twelve-string guitar

"She Says That She Needs Me"

Personnel taken from Imagination liner notes.

- Joe Thomas – acoustic piano
- Eddie Bayers – drums
- Michael Rhodes – bass
- Brent Rowan – acoustic and electric guitars
- Paul Mertens – clarinets and flutes
- Larry Franklin – violin and viola
- Richie Cannata – saxophone
