= Still I Dream of It =

Song by the Beach Boys

from the album Good Vibrations: Thirty Years of The Beach Boys
- Released: June 29, 1993
- Recorded: 1977
- Length: 3:26
- Songwriter: Brian Wilson
- Producer: Brian Wilson

"Still I Dream of It" is a song by American rock band the Beach Boys that was recorded in early 1977. Written by Brian Wilson, the song was written for Frank Sinatra, but was also intended for Stevie Wonder or Elton John, in case Sinatra would reject it. The band recorded the song for their album Adult/Child, which was never released.

In 1993, the track was released on the box set Good Vibrations: Thirty Years of The Beach Boys. A 1976 home demo version of Brian Wilson singing the song and accompanying himself on piano was included on Wilson's 1995 solo album I Just Wasn't Made for These Times. Both the finished track and the demo were also included on the 2026 box set We Gotta Groove: The Brother Studio Years.

== Reception ==
Music journalist Barney Hoskyns called the song's pathos "irresistible."

== Personnel ==
Credits sourced from John Brode, Will Crerar, Joshilyn Hoisington, and Craig Slowinski.

The Beach Boys

- Brian Wilson - lead and backing vocals, grand piano
- Carl Wilson - backing vocals

Additional musicians

- Murray Adler - violin
- Max Bennett - bass guitar
- Harry Bluestone - violin
- Dennis Budimir - electric guitar
- William Calkins - flute
- James Decker - French horn
- Bonnie Douglas - violin
- Elliott Fisher - violin
- James Getzoff - violin
- Igor Horoshevsky - cello
- Jules Jacob - oboe
- Raymond Kelley - cello
- Harry Klee - flute
- Lou Klass - violin
- Alfred Lustgarten - violin
- Kathleen Lustgarten - cello
- Arthur Maebe - French horn
- Ted Nash - flute
- Earl Palmer - drums
- Richard Perissi - French horn
- Nathan Ross - violin
- Meyer Rubin - arco double bass
- Josef Schoenbrun - violin
- Wilbur Schwartz - flute
- Frederick Seykora - cello
- Paul Shure - violin
- Marshall Sosson - violin
- Robert Stone - arco double bass

== Covers ==
The song has been covered by Ed Harcourt and was released as a limited edition single, it is also found on the Elephant's Graveyard a collection of Harcourt's B-sides and rarities. Jimmy Nail, and Carice van Houten have also covered the song. American Let's Player Matt Watson also covered this song.
