= Catch a Wave (book) =

2006 book by Peter Ames Carlin

- Author: Peter Ames Carlin
- Language: English
- Subject: The Beach Boys
- Publication date: 2006
- Publication place: United States
- Pages: 342
- ISBN: 978-1594867491

Catch a Wave (subtitled The Rise, Fall and Redemption of the Beach Boys' Brian Wilson) is a 2006 book covering the life of the Beach Boys' Brian Wilson, written by American journalist and critic Peter Ames Carlin.

== Reception ==
The Guardian's Campbell Stevenson praised Catch a Wave as "diligently researched and even-handed", as well as "less opinionated" than biographer David Leaf's past writings about the Beach Boys. PopMatters' Bill Gibron rued that the book offered a fresh perspective on the band, "taking what could have been the same old song ... and turning it into a spiritual journey of excuses, expectations and exaggerations."

In his review for the New York Times, Bruce Handy praised Carlin's avoidance of hagiography, writing that "his Wilson is both a victim, too fragile for this world, and a passive-aggressive manipulator, a man who, at times, willfully squandered his talent." Handy concluded that "while this might not be the best possible book about Brian Wilson and the Beach Boys, for now it's the best one down here where mortals tread."
