= Billy Hinsche =

American musician (1951–2021)

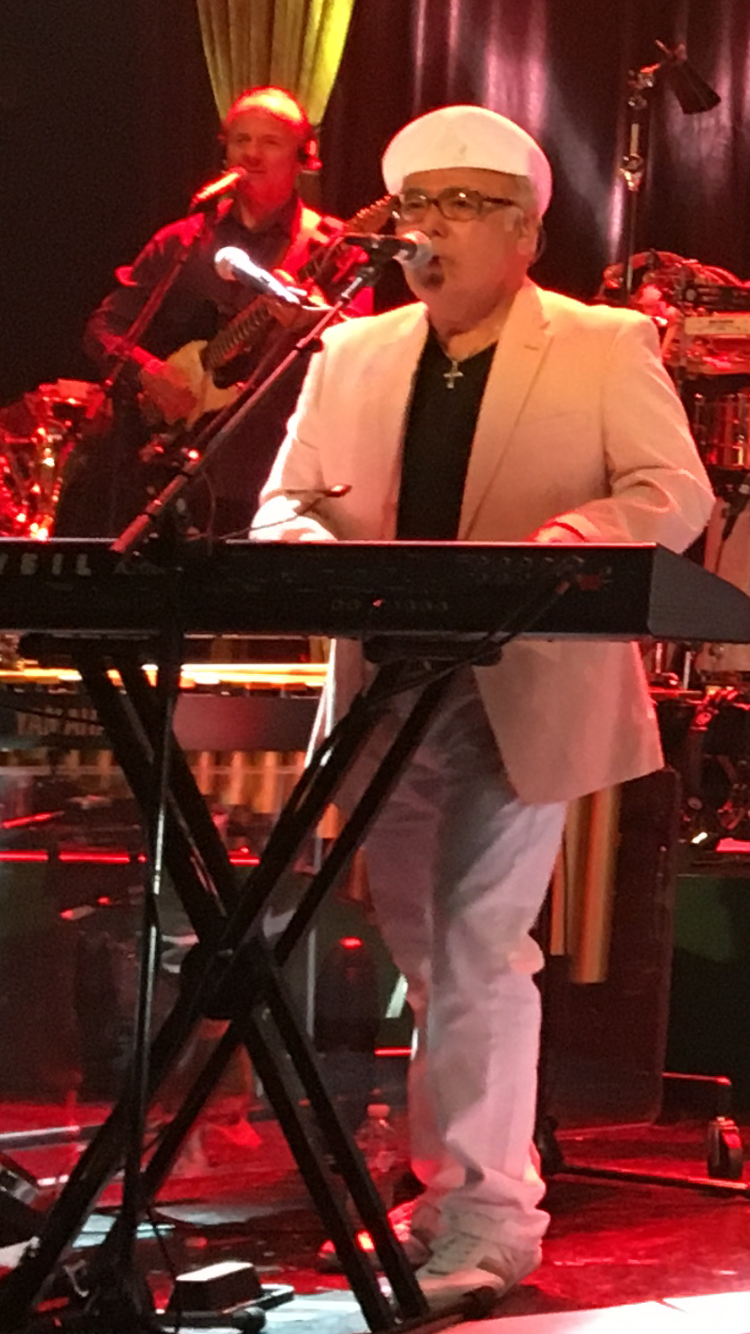
- Hinsche performing live in 2017

Background information
- Born: William Ernest Hinsche; June 29, 1951; Manila, Philippines
- Origin: Beverly Hills, California, U.S.
- Died: November 20, 2021 (aged 70) Santa Monica, California, U.S.
- Genres: Rock; pop
- Occupations: vocalist; musician; arranger
- Instruments: Vocals; guitar; piano; bass guitar
- Years active: 1965–2021
- Labels: Capitol; Reprise; RD&B Records
- Formerly of: Dino, Desi, & Billy; The Beach Boys; Brian Wilson; Carl Wilson

William Ernest Hinsche (June 29, 1951 – November 20, 2021) was an American musician who was a co-founding member of the singing trio Dino, Desi & Billy and a keyboardist for the Beach Boys' backing band.

== Early life ==
Hinsche was born in Manila, the Philippines, the son of Celia Bautista and Otto "Doc" Hinsche, who owned a local casino. His father was from New Jersey, and his mother was a Filipina. The family moved to the United States and settled in Beverly Hills. Hinsche attended Beverly Hills Catholic School, where he met Desi Arnaz, Jr. and Dean Paul Martin. The three later formed the group Dino, Desi & Billy and signed with Frank Sinatra's record label Reprise Records.

== Career ==
In the late 1960s, Hinsche began to work as a session musician for The Beach Boys. Although he declined at least one offer to formally join the group in favor of continuing his education in August 1969, he toured extensively with the band as a vocalist and multi-instrumentalist (often playing keyboards and rhythm guitar) from 1971 to 1977 and 1982 to 1996. His sister, Annie Hinsche-Wilson-Karges, was married to the group's guitarist, Carl Wilson. He earned a B.F.A. from the University of California, Los Angeles School of Theater, Film and Television in 1974.

Billy Hinsche provided backing vocals on recordings for Elton John's "Don't Let The Sun Go Down On Me," Warren Zevon's "Desperados Under The Eaves," America's "Hat Trick," Joan Jett's "Good Music" and others.

He was also part of a UK "legends" music concept: the Beach Legends, and USA Legends, which did some shows in the UK. Featured Dennis Diken (The Smithereens) on drums, David Marks (co-founding member of The Beach Boys), Robert Lamm (Chicago), Jeffrey Foskett (Brian Wilson, Beach Boys), and Charlotte Cooper (Lucky Guy on Spotify).

== Death ==
Hinsche died of lung cancer on November 20, 2021, after a short illness. His mother, Celia Hinsche, also died on the same day.

== Discography ==
=== Singles with Dino, Desi & Billy ===
- Since You Broke My Heart / We Know—Reprise 0324—released 11-2-64
- I'm A Fool / So Many Ways—Reprise 0367–4-12-65
- I'm A Fool / So Many Ways /Since You Broke My Heart / We Know—Reprise 60072 ep (France) -- 4-12-65
- Not The Lovin' Kind / Chimes Of Freedom—Reprise 0401–8-18-65
- Please Don't Fight It / The Rebel Kind—Reprise 0426–11-10-65
- Superman / I Can't Get Her Off My Mind—Reprise 0444–1-19-66
- Tie Me Down / It's Just The Way You Are—Reprise 0462–3-23-66
- Look Out Girls (Here We Come) / She's So Far Out She's In—Reprise 0469–5-20-66
- I Hope She's There Tonight / Josephine—Reprise 0529–10-12-66
- If You're Thinkin' What I'm Thinkin' / Pretty Flamingo—Reprise 0544–12-13-66
- Two in the Afternoon / Good Luck, Best Wishes to You—Reprise 0579–4-19-67
- Kitty Doyle / Without Hurtin' Some—Reprise 0619–8-2-67
- My What a Shame / The Inside Outside Caspar Milquetoast Eskimo Flash—Reprise 0653
- Tell Someone You Love Them / General Outline—Reprise 0698–5-29-68
- Thru Spray Colored Glasses / Someday—Uni 55127
- Hawley / Let's Talk it Over—Columbia 4-44975–1969
- Lady Love / A Certain Sound—Reprise 0965–10-14-70
- Under A Beach Boy Moon -- (Digital Release Only) -- RD&B Records LLC—5-4-12

=== Albums with Dino, Desi & Billy ===
- I'm a Fool -- Reprise R (Mono)/RS (Stereo) 6176—U.S. #51, 9/65
- Our Time's Coming—Reprise R/RS 6194—U.S. #119, 2/66
- Memories Are Made of This—Reprise R/RS 6198–1966
- Souvenir—Reprise R/RS 6224–1966
- Follow Me (1969 film) Original Soundtrack -- Uni ST73056–1969
- The Rebel Kind: The Best of Dino, Desi & Billy -- Sundazed, 1996

=== Albums with Ricci, Desi & Billy ===
- Live In Vegas—RD&B Records, LLC—2001
- Live From Boulder City—RD&B Records, LLC—2002

=== Albums with The Beach Boys ===
- Beach Boys' Party! (1965)
- Smiley Smile (1967)
- Carl and the Passions – "So Tough" (1972)
- Holland (1973)
- In Concert (1973)
- 15 Big Ones (1976)
- The Beach Boys Love You (1977)
- M.I.U. Album (1978)
- L.A. (Light Album) (1979)
- Songs from Here & Back (2006)

=== Albums with Carl Wilson of The Beach Boys ===
- Carl Wilson (1981)
- Youngblood (1983)

== Films ==
- Murderer's Row (1966)
- Play Songs of the Beach Boys: Piano Accompaniments to Rock Classics - MFM Productions[VHS]
- Dennis Wilson Forever - Sony/Bmg Int'l - [DVD] 2008
- 1974 - On The Road With The Beach Boys - MFM Productions - [DVD] 2009
- Carl Wilson - Here and Now - MFM Productions - [DVD] 2011
- 24 HOURS - MFM Productions - [DVD] 2011
- Know the Road (Redux) - MFM Productions - [DVD] 2012
- Home Movies - MFM Productions - [DVD] 2012
- Dean Martin: King of Cool - Appian Way/Danny Strong Productions - TCM 2021
