= Brother Records =

American record label and holding company

Brother Records, Inc.
- Type: Holding
- Industry: Music
- Founded: 1966; 60 years ago
- Founders: Mike Love; Brian Wilson; Carl Wilson; Dennis Wilson
- Brands: The Beach Boys
- Owner: Iconic Artists Group; Mike Love; Al Jardine; estate of Brian Wilson; estate of Carl Wilson

Brother Records, Inc. (BRI) is an American holding company and record label established in 1966 that owns the intellectual property rights of the Beach Boys, including "The Beach Boys" trademark. It was founded by brothers Brian, Carl and Dennis Wilson, and their cousin Mike Love. Since 2021, a majority of BRI is owned by Irving Azoff's Iconic Artists Group, with band members Mike Love and Al Jardine and the estates of band members Brian and Carl Wilson co-owning the remainder.

== Formation ==
The Beach Boys decided to form their own label, Brother Records, in response to Capitol Records' lack of support for the band's more ambitious album ideas. According to biographer Steven Gaines, Mike Love was "the most receptive" to the proposal, wanting the Beach Boys to have more creative control over their work, and supported Brian Wilson's decision to employ his newfound "best friend" David Anderle as head of the label, even though it was against band manager Nick Grillo's wishes.

Plans for the company began in August 1966. In a press release, Anderle said that Brother Records was to give "entirely new concepts to the recording industry, and to give the Beach Boys total creative and promotional control over their product". Anderle later said that the label was for releasing projects that were "special" for Brian, and there was initially no concern over whether the label's products would be distributed by Capitol. Another one of the major reasons that Brother Records was formed was so that Wilson could create his own recording studio.

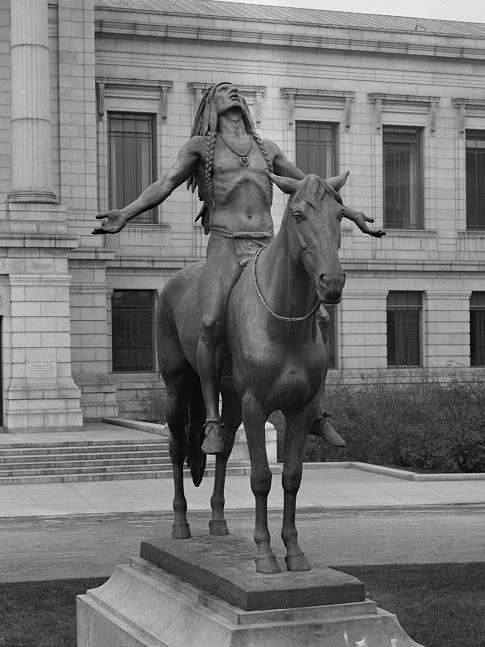
"Appeal to the Great Spirit" was used as the logo for Brother Records

For the company logo, Wilson chose Cyrus E. Dallin's 1908 life size bronze statue Appeal to the Great Spirit at the Museum of Fine Arts in Boston. When Carl Wilson was asked in 1975 why the group used this as their logo, he said the Indian was chosen because the Wilson brothers' grandfather believed that there was a spiritual Indian guide who watched over them from the "other side". Carl called the logo "The Last Horizon."

Brother Records' office took residence at 9000 Sunset Boulevard and Grillo was assigned the role of financial administrator. Singer Danny Hutton was to have been one of the first artists signed to the label. The Beach Boys also established a short-lived film production company, called Home Movies, to create live action film and television properties starring themselves. The company completed only one production, a promotional clip for "Good Vibrations".

Wilson started having increasing doubts about the Smile project and showing signs of worsening mental health during the latter months of 1966. On February 28, 1967, the band launched a lawsuit against Capitol that sought neglected royalty payments in the amount of $250,000 (equivalent to $2.46 million in 2025). Within the lawsuit, there was also an attempt to terminate their record contract prior to its November 1969 expiry. Following the suit, Wilson announced that the company would issue "Vega-Tables" as the lead single from Smile.

Anderle met with many record companies but failed to secure a distributor for Brother Records. Frustrated by Wilson's regressive behavior, Anderle ultimately disassociated from the group. The last time Wilson was visited by Anderle to discuss business matters, Wilson refused to leave his bedroom. The Capitol lawsuit was eventually settled out of court, with the Beach Boys receiving the royalties owed in exchange for Brother Records to distribute through Capitol Records. An official announcement of the resolution was made on July 18.

== Later years ==
Al Jardine became a shareholder in 1973.

Following his death in 1983, Dennis Wilson's heirs sold his shares back to the band to repay loans.

By 2011, the corporation was equally owned by four shareholders and directors: Brian Wilson, Mike Love, Al Jardine, and the estate of Carl Wilson. According to Love in his 2016 memoir, BRI's shareholders continued to receive 17.5% of all revenue under the terms of the license.

In February 2021, it was announced that Brian Wilson, Love, Jardine, and the estate of Carl Wilson had sold a majority stake in the band's intellectual property to Irving Azoff and his new company Iconic Artists Group.

== Discography ==
| Artist | Title | Year |
|---|---|---|
| The Beach Boys | Smiley Smile | 1967 |
| The Beach Boys | Sunflower | 1970 |
| The Flames | The Flame | 1970 |
| The Beach Boys | Surf's Up | 1971 |
| The Beach Boys | Carl and the Passions – "So Tough" | 1972 |
| The Beach Boys | Holland | 1973 |
| The Beach Boys | The Beach Boys in Concert | 1973 |
| The Beach Boys | 15 Big Ones | 1976 |
| The Beach Boys | Love You | 1977 |
| The Beach Boys | M.I.U. Album | 1978 |
| The Beach Boys | L.A. (Light Album) | 1979 |
| The Beach Boys | Keepin' the Summer Alive | 1980 |
| The Beach Boys | The Beach Boys | 1985 |
| The Beach Boys | 25 Years of Good Vibrations | 1986 |
| The Beach Boys | Summer in Paradise | 1992 |

== See also ==
- Brother Studios

== Bibliography ==
- Badman, Keith (2004). The Beach Boys: The Definitive Diary of America's Greatest Band, on Stage and in the Studio. Backbeat Books. ISBN 978-0-87930-818-6.
- Dillon, Mark (2012). Fifty Sides of the Beach Boys: The Songs That Tell Their Story. ECW Press. ISBN 978-1-77090-198-8.
- Gaines, Steven (1986). Heroes and Villains: The True Story of The Beach Boys. New York: Da Capo Press. ISBN 0306806479.
- Leaf, David (1978). The Beach Boys and the California Myth. Grosset & Dunlap. ISBN 978-0-448-14626-3.
- Love, Mike (2016). Good Vibrations: My Life as a Beach Boy. Penguin Publishing Group. ISBN 978-0-698-40886-9.
- Matijas-Mecca, Christian (2017). The Words and Music of Brian Wilson. ABC-CLIO. ISBN 978-1-4408-3899-6.
- Priore, Domenic (2005). Smile: The Story of Brian Wilson's Lost Masterpiece. London: Sanctuary. ISBN 1860746276.
- Stebbins, Jon (2011). The Beach Boys FAQ: All That's Left to Know About America's Band. ISBN 9781458429148.
