= Brother Studios =

1974–1979 American recording studio

Coordinates: 34°0′58.91″N 118°29′35.73″W

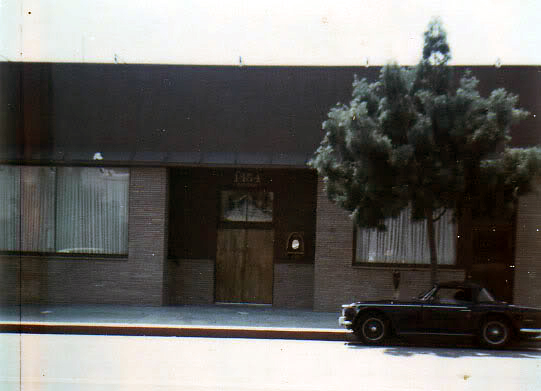
- The front of Brother Studios in the mid-1970s. The front door was not used for access, the back alleyway was the preferred entrance.
- Trade name: Crimson Sound
- Founded: 1974 in Santa Monica, California, US
- Founders: Brian Wilson; Dennis Wilson; Carl Wilson
- Headquarters: 1454 5th St, Santa Monica, California, US

Brother Studios (later renamed Crimson Sound) was the name of a recording studio located at 1454 5th St, Santa Monica, California, established by brothers Brian, Dennis, and Carl Wilson, co-founders of the Beach Boys.

== History ==
Brother Studios was named after the Beach Boys' record label, Brother Records and officially opened for public use in May 1974. The studio was functional as early as January 1974 as certain high-profile artists such as Elton John had begun using the facility. Brother Studios served as the primary recording base of the Beach Boys until it was sold to engineer Hank Cicalo and jazz musician Tom Scott in 1978 who subsequently renamed it Crimson Sound.

=== Sessions at Brother Studios ===
| Date(s) | Artist | Album | Note(s) |
|---|---|---|---|
| 1974 | Elton John | Caribou | |
| 1975 | Elton John | Blue Moves | |
| 1975 | Jim Dutch | Untitled (unreleased) | |
| 1975–76 | The Beach Boys | 15 Big Ones | |
| 1976 | The Quick | Mondo Deco | |
| 1976–77 | Ricci Martin | Beached | |
| 1976 | The Runaways | Queens of Noise | |
| 1976 | Helen Reddy | Ear Candy | |
| 1976 | Lisa Hartman | Lisa Hartman | |
| 1975–77 | Dennis Wilson | Pacific Ocean Blue | |
| 1976–77 | The Beach Boys | Love You | |
| 1977 | Crane | Crane | |
| 1977–78 | Dennis Wilson | Bambu (unreleased) | |
| 1978 | The Paley Brothers | The Paley Brothers | |
| 1978 | Terry Reid | Rogue Waves | |
| 1979 | Mink DeVille | Le Chat Bleu | |
| 1979 | Tom Scott | Street Beat | |
| 1979 | Ben Sidran | The Cat and the Hat | |
| 1979 | Donna Summer/Barbra Streisand | No More Tears (Enough Is Enough) | |
| 1979 | Nielsen/Pearson | Nielsen/Pearson | |
