= Peter Ames Carlin =

American journalist and writer (born 1963)

- Born: March 13, 1963 (age 63); Syracuse, New York
- Education: Macalester College, St. Paul, Minn.; Lewis & Clark College, Portland, Ore.
- Occupations: Journalist, critic and author
- Writing career
- Subjects: Popular music and television
- Website: peteramescarlin.com

Peter Ames Carlin (born March 14, 1963) is an American journalist, critic and biographer who has written for publications such as People magazine, The New York Times Magazine, The Los Angeles Times Magazine, and The Oregonian. Several of his published books focus on popular music and musicians, including Catch a Wave: The Rise, Fall and Redemption of the Beach Boys' Brian Wilson (2006).

== Early life and education ==
Born in Syracuse, New York, Carlin was raised in Seattle, Washington, where he attended public schools including Garfield High School, from which he graduated in 1981. He attended Macalester College in Saint Paul, Minnesota, for a year then graduated from Lewis & Clark College in Portland, Oregon in 1985.

== Career ==
Carlin started publishing freelance work in 1985. Still living in Portland, he contributed stories to a wide variety of publications, including cover stories to The New York Times Magazine and The Los Angeles Times Magazine. In 1993, Carlin co-authored the autobiography of mountaineer Stacy Allison, the first American woman to summit Mount Everest. In 1996, he moved to New York City to become a senior writer at People magazine, where he reported and wrote profiles about the Beach Boys member Brian Wilson, Monty Python co-founder John Cleese and Ernest Hemingway.

Hired by The Oregonian newspaper to serve as its television columnist, Carlin moved back to Portland in late 2000. His years-long feud with Fox News host Bill O'Reilly became a cause celèbre among journalists and cultural commentators. Carlin was also an early and influential advocate for the TV series Arrested Development, Lost, The Shield and Mad Men.

Switching to feature writing in 2008, Carlin researched and wrote a three-part series about former KOIN-TV news director Jeff Alan, revealing the executive's previous identity and years of financial fraud against the U.S. government and financial institutions. Published in April 2009, Carlin's stories prompted a year-long federal investigation that in April 2010 resulted in a 13-count federal indictment. Alan eventually pleaded guilty to Social Security fraud and was sentenced to 18 months in federal prison.

Carlin resigned from The Oregonian in May 2011 in order to focus on writing books. Author Buzz Bissinger praised Carlin's ability to write clearly and movingly about music, saying "If there is anyone who writes about modern musicians better than Carlin does, I don't know who it could possibly be." The New York Times Book Review has reviewed three of Carlin's most recent works, biographies about Brian Wilson, Paul McCartney (review penned by singer/songwriter Suzanne Vega) and Bruce Springsteen the latter of which landed on The New York Times Hardcover Nonfiction Best Sellers list. His account of the life of singer/songwriter Paul Simon was released in October 2016. Carlin's next book, published in January 2021, is Sonic Boom, a history of Warner Bros. Records. His biography of the rock group R.E.M. was published by Doubleday in 2024.

== Publications ==
- Brave New Bride (as Peter Carlin) (Grand Central, 1992) ISBN 978-0446393300
- Beyond the Limits: A Woman's Triumph on Everest (as Peter Carlin with Stacy Allison) (Little, Brown, 1993) ISBN 978-1581510560
- Catch a Wave: The Rise, Fall and Redemption of the Beach Boys' Brian Wilson (Rodale, 2006) ISBN 978-1594867491
- Paul McCartney: A Life (Touchstone, 2009) ISBN 978-1416562092
- Bruce (Touchstone, 2012) ISBN 978-1439191828
- Homeward Bound: The Life of Paul Simon (Henry Holt and Co., 2016) ISBN 978-1627790345
- Sonic Boom: The Impossible Rise of Warner Bros. Records (Henry Holt and Co., 2021) ISBN 978-1250301567
- The Name of This Band Is R.E.M. (Doubleday, 2024) ISBN 978-0385546942
- Tonight in Jungleland: The Making of Born to Run (Doubleday, 2025) ISBN 978-0385551533
