= The Beach Boys' unreleased and bootleg recordings =

Many recordings and performances by the Beach Boys have attained some level of public circulation without being available as a legal release, and several albums by the band or its members were fully assembled or near completion, before being shelved, rejected, or revised as an entirely new project. Since the early 1980s, numerous rarities compilations and album reissues have been released with studio outtakes included as bonus tracks.

Bootleg recordings arise from a multitude of sources, including broadcast performances, recordings of live shows, test discs, privately distributed copies of demos, and covertly copied studio session tapes. Some recordings have never seen wide public circulation. Others are only rumored to exist, were misapprehended to tangentially related projects, or have yet to surface in the hands of archivists or record collectors. This article includes commonly bootlegged material and unreleased (or formerly unreleased) recordings that are reported to exist.

Some of the largest sources of Beach Boys bootleg material have derived from the Pet Sounds and Smile sessions; their underground circulation eventually resulted in the officially issued compilations The Pet Sounds Sessions (1997) and The Smile Sessions (2011). In 2013, the latter won the Grammy Award for Best Historical Album. In 2011, Uncut voted Smile the number one "greatest bootleg recording of all time". In 2003, Stylus Magazine named the Beach Boys' Smile, Landlocked, Adult Child, and Dennis Wilson's Bambu "A Lost Album Category Unto Themselves".

== Background ==
=== Existence of tapes ===
The current existence of most of the Beach Boys' tape masters was made possible by the fact that the band was in control of their material. Typically, record labels at the time would possess the multi-tracks, then wipe them once a final master was mixed down. However, a myriad of original multi-track masters have been lost due to various circumstances. Some reports currently missing are:

- "Good Vibrations": The final multi-track. It is speculated to have been left behind at CBS Columbia Square shortly after the record was made.
- Smile: A half-inch reel that may have also been left behind or destroyed at Capitol Records headquarters in 1968. This includes the multi-tracks to the songs "Wonderful,” “My Only Sunshine,” and "Cabinessence".
- Various tracks recorded since the 1960s with little information known beyond their song titles.

=== Discoveries ===
In the last few decades, reels of tapes that were thought to be lost have been intermittently rediscovered.

- In 1990 – CBS Columbia Square delivered a reel of 1965-era tapes sourced from the album Summer Days (and Summer Nights!!) which were thought to be lost. When the studio closed, a major number of tapes were left behind. Ten years later, they were all destroyed without checking for inventory.
- In 2009 – Beach Boys biographer Jon Stebbins was contacted by a man living in central California who possessed a box of multi-track tapes deriving from the Shut Down Volume 2 album that had been lost for decades.
- In 2010 – Twenty-eight tapes that were stolen from the Beach Boys and Capitol archives in 1980 were retrieved; this included the original multi-track masters to "Do It Again", "We're Together Again", Adult Child, and a version of California Feeling.
- In 2010 – A piano demo of "Surf's Up" was found hidden within a reel of the Wild Honey track "Country Air". It was soon included on The Smile Sessions (2011).
- In 2013 – Acetates were unearthed that showed "I'm in Great Shape" as part of the projected "Heroes and Villains" single. Before the release of Made in California (2013), a reel of tapes sourced from November 1964 live performances broadcast on BBC were retrieved.
- In 2014 – Writer Brian Chidester reported that additional Brian Wilson recordings dated from the late 1960s and early 1970s were recently found.

=== 2012 copyright extension ===
In 2012, a new European Union copyright law was passed which extended the copyright of songs to 70 years, but only for recordings that were published within 50 years after they were made. To prevent recordings made by 1960s artists from legally entering the public domain, many new rarities compilations were issued by record labels. For the Beach Boys, this began with the digitally exclusive release The Big Beat 1963 (2013).

== Unreleased albums ==
=== Smile (1966–1967) ===
Smile is an unfinished album that was abandoned in 1967. A large portion of the recordings were released on Good Vibrations: Thirty Years of the Beach Boys (1993) and The Smile Sessions (2011).

=== Lei'd in Hawaii (1967) ===
Lei'd in Hawaii is a live album recorded in August and September 1967. In 2017, the album was included in the compilation 1967 – Sunshine Tomorrow.

=== 1975 Beach Boys/Chicago tour live album ===
In 1975, Chicago and the Beach Boys performed together on a joint summer tour. These performances were recorded for a potential live album, but one never materialized.

=== Adult/Child (1977) ===
Adult/Child was the intended follow-up to The Beach Boys Love You (1977).

=== Merry Christmas from the Beach Boys (1977) ===
Merry Christmas from the Beach Boys is the second Christmas album recorded by The Beach Boys and their third album planned for release in 1977. It was reportedly denied by Warner Bros. Records. Instead, the group released M.I.U. Album in 1978 which was composed of songs from the same sessions.

=== Summer's Gone (2011–12) ===
Summer's Gone was the original title for the group's 2012 reunion album That's Why God Made the Radio, and an album-length suite was written in the theme. Only four of five tracks from the suite's closing half were included. The fifth was "I'd Go Anywhere" and would have fit between "Strange World" and "From There to Back Again". Both "I'd Go Anywhere" and the suite's opening half remain incomplete. Producer Joe Thomas had indicated a desire to finish the suite, which had its origins in 1998 as cassette demos before Wilson began working on them again in 2008. A total of 28 songs were written and recorded for the album. In 2013, it was announced that Wilson was working on finishing the thematic tracks (now dubbed "The Suite") for a new solo project.

== Other material ==
=== Reverberation (1969–70) ===
An alternate version of Sunflower and 20/20 contained multiple tracks that would not be released for many years.

=== Landlocked (1970s) ===
Landlocked was a working title for Surf's Up (1971) and Carl and the Passions – "So Tough" (1972). Many bootlegs later adopted the title.

=== Bedroom Tapes (1960s–70s) ===
"Bedroom Tapes" is an umbrella term for much of the unreleased material that Brian Wilson recorded in the late 1960s to early 1970s. It was coined by music journalist Brian Chidester in a 2014 article for LA Weekly.

=== Caribou Ranch sessions (1974) ===
In the mid-1970s, the Beach Boys recorded a wealth of unreleased material that had been intended for the album that became 15 Big Ones (1976).

=== Studio reunion and Paley sessions (1990s) ===
In the 1990s, Brian worked with multi-instrumentalist Andy Paley on an assortment of recordings destined for a potential album that could have featured some involvement with the Beach Boys.

== Solo Beach Boys and side projects ==
=== Charles Manson sessions (1968) ===
According to Charles Manson, the musician later convicted for several murders, he took part in "a pretty fair session, putting down about ten songs" at Brian's home studio. Band manager Nick Grillo stated that there were approximately "a hundred hours" of Manson's music recorded at the studio. In 1971, Mike Love told Rolling Stone that the band still possessed "several 8-track tapes of Charlie and the girls that Dennis cut." In Vincent Bugliosi's 1974 book Helter Skelter, he reported that Dennis claimed to have destroyed the tapes, because "the vibrations connected with them don't belong on this earth."

While the group denied that tapes of these sessions exist – with co-productions by Carl and Brian (not Dennis as had often been stated) – engineer Stephen Desper averred that they do, believing at the time that Manson's material was "pretty good... he had musical talent." The recordings were not demos as is often believed, but complete studio productions of songs which may have later appeared as rerecordings on his album Lie: The Love and Terror Cult (1970). Badman states that a run-through of Manson's "Look at Your Game, Girl" was recorded on the same eight-track tape used for the 20/20 outtake "Well You Know I Knew".

Music historian Andrew Doe has written that the chance of Manson's recordings seeing an official release has "not a hope in hell." In 2009, photographer Ed Roach, a friend of Dennis's, posted online that he had "witnessed Dennis throw a 2" master tape in the ocean the year he died; (believe me, I tried to stop him!) I do understand that there is an additional tape still in the vault." Asked about the existence of those tapes in 2021, Brother Records archive manager Alan Boyd declined to offer a comment.

=== A World of Peace Must Come (1969) ===
A World of Peace Must Come is an album by poet Stephen Kalinich that was produced by Brian Wilson in August and September 1969. It was officially released on October 6, 2008.

=== Friends remake (1970s) ===
In the early 1970s, Wilson rewrote and rerecorded some cuts from the Friends album. Of the songs rerecorded, it was only the semi-instrumental "Passing By" that was eventually released on the compilation album Wake the World: The Friends Sessions in 2018, with notable differences being the addition of lyrics sung by Brian. The others are believed to have been lost or erased.

=== Cows in the Pasture (1970s) ===
Cows in the Pasture is an unfinished country and western album by band promoter Fred Vail that was produced by Brian Wilson in April 1970. In February 2024, it was announced that the album would finally see an official release, in 2025. Later delayed to 2026.

=== Poops/Hubba Hubba (1970s) ===
Dennis's unfinished solo album from the early 1970s, co-produced with Daryl Dragon.

=== Bambu (1977–1979) ===
Bambu is an unfinished Dennis Wilson solo album which would have followed his first, Pacific Ocean Blue (1977).

=== The Cocaine Sessions (1981) ===
"The Cocaine Sessions" (or "The Hamburger Sessions") refers to a sporadic, collaborative recording session conducted by Brian Wilson in 1981 at musicologist Garby Leon's beach house. Recordings were made for songs entitled "Yeah", "Oh Lord", "City Blues", "I Made a Prayer" or "I Search This World", "Why Don't You Tell Me Why" or "You've Been", and "I Feel So Fine" (including a snippet of a cover of the Ronettes' "Be My Baby") on bootlegs as well as a rendition of "Heroes and Villains" with at least one other song, a ballad entitled "Bobby, Dale and Holly", having yet to surface officially or otherwise. The titles popularly assigned to the sessions derive from an anecdote that Dennis Wilson gave Brian cocaine and McDonald's hamburgers in exchange for his participation (which was dramatized in a scene of the 1990 television movie Summer Dreams: The Story of the Beach Boys) with Leon preferring "The Hamburger Sessions" as he claimed no cocaine was involved in the sessions themselves. Another song written by the two Wilsons and Leon, "Stevie", was later recorded at a studio as Dennis' final production before he died in 1983.

Sequences that would later form the "Rio Grande" suite on Brian's 1988 debut solo album reportedly also came from the collaboration. "I Made a Prayer" was reworked into "This Isn't Love" and recorded by actor Alan Cumming for the 2000 film The Flintstones in Viva Rock Vegas' soundtrack. Brian later rerecorded "City Blues" (without co-writing credits of Dennis and/or Leon) featuring Eric Clapton for his 2004 album Gettin' In Over My Head. "Stevie" was allegedly written about Stevie Nicks of Fleetwood Mac and was considered for the 2013 box set Made in California.

=== The Wilson Project (1986–87) ===
"The Wilson Project" refers to sessions conducted between Brian and Gary Usher from June 1986 to July 1987 before the recording of Brian's first solo album. The name derives from Stephen McParland's book The Wilson Project, drawn from journals and tape diaries kept by Usher from the period.

=== Sweet Insanity (1990–91) ===
Sweet Insanity is an unofficial Brian Wilson solo album that would have followed his first. It was rejected twice by Sire Records due to the inclusion of a rap song entitled "Smart Girls" and certain lyrics written by Wilson's conservator Eugene Landy.

== Bootlegs ==
=== Vigotone ===
In 1993, the bootleg label Vigotone released a 2 CD edition of Smile (VT-110 &111), including a "complete" version of the album as well as other outtakes. 1998, the label Vigotone followed up with Heroes and Vibrations (VT-163), a forty-minute disc culling working tapes from "Good Vibrations" and "Heroes and Villains".

=== Sea of Tunes ===
Beginning in 1997, the Luxembourg-based bootleg label Sea of Tunes (named after the Beach Boys' original publishing company) began releasing a series of CDs featuring high-quality outtakes, session tracks and alternate recordings that spanned the group's entire career. Among these was a three-CD set featuring over three hours of sessions for "Good Vibrations", and several multi-CD sets containing a significant number of the tracking, overdubbing, and mixing sessions for Smile. Those involved with releasing these bootlegs were later apprehended by authorities, and it was reported that nearly 10,000 discs were seized.

=== Discography ===
Provided by the AllMusic database and Bret Wheadon.

- Unsurpassed Masters Vol. 1 (1962) The Alternate Surfin' Safari Album (1997)
- Unsurpassed Masters Vol. 2 (1963) The Alternate Surfin' USA Album (1997)
- Unsurpassed Masters Vol. 3 (1963) The Alternate Surfer Girl Album (1997)
- Unsurpassed Masters Vol. 4 (1963) Miscellaneous Trax (1997)
- The Beach Boys Live In Sacramento, 1964 (1997)
- The Beach Boys Live In Sacramento, 1964 Second Show! (1997)
- The Beach Boys Christmas Sessions (1997)
- Unsurpassed Masters Vol. 5 (1964) Miscellaneous Trax Vol. 2 (1998)
- Unsurpassed Masters Vol. 6 (1964) The Alternate "All Summer Long" Album (1998)
- Unsurpassed Masters Vol. 7 (1964) The Alternate "Today" Album, Vol. 1 (1998)
- Unsurpassed Masters Vol. 8 (1965) The Alternate "Today" Album, Vol. 2 (1998)
- Unsurpassed Masters Vol. 9 (1965) The Alternate "Summer Days (and Summer Nights!)" Album (1998)
- Unsurpassed Masters Vol. 10 (1965) The Alternate "Beach Boys Party!" Album (1998)
- Unsurpassed Masters Vol. 11 (1965) Miscellaneous Trax Vol. 3 (1998)
- Unsurpassed Masters Vol. 12 (1965) "Sloop John B" Sessions and Radio Spots (1998)
- Unsurpassed Masters Vol. 13 (1965–66) The Alternate "Pet Sound" Album, Vol. 1 (1998)
- Unsurpassed Masters Vol. 14 (1966) The Alternate "Pet Sound" Album, Vol. 2 (1998)
- The Live Box (1965–1968) The Complete Michigan Concert Tapes and More... (1998)
- Unsurpassed Masters Vol. 15 (1966) Good Vibrations (1999)
- Unsurpassed Masters Vol. 16 (1966–1967) Smile (1999)
- Unsurpassed Masters Vol. 17 (1966–1967) Smile Sessions (1999)
- Unsurpassed Masters Vol. 18 (1967) The Alternate "Smiley Smile" Album (1999)
- Unsurpassed Masters Vol. 19 (1967) The Alternate "Wild Honey" Album (1999)
- Unsurpassed Masters Vol. 20 (1968–69) "Friends, 20/20 and Odds & Ends" (1999)
- Unsurpassed Masters Vol. 21 "Today/Summer Days (And Summer Nights!!)" [STEREO] (1999)
- In The Beginning/The Garage Tapes (2007)
- All This Is That (2007)

== Bibliography ==
- Badman, Keith (2004). The Beach Boys: The Definitive Diary of America's Greatest Band, on Stage and in the Studio. Backbeat Books. ISBN 978-0-87930-818-6.
- Carlin, Peter Ames (2006). Catch a Wave: The Rise, Fall, and Redemption of the Beach Boys' Brian Wilson. Rodale. ISBN 978-1-59486-320-2.
- Heylin, Clinton (2010). Bootleg! The Rise And Fall Of The Secret Recording Industry. Omnibus Press. ISBN 978-0-85712-217-9.
- Manson, Charles (1994). Manson in His Own Words. Grove/Atlantic, Incorporated. ISBN 978-0-8021-3024-2.
- Stebbins, Jon (2011). The Beach Boys FAQ: All That's Left to Know About America's Band. Backbeat Books. ISBN 9781458429148.
