= Brian Wilson (album) =

1988 studio album by Brian Wilson

Studio album by Brian Wilson
- Released: July 12, 1988
- Recorded: April 1987 – May 5, 1988
- Studios: Ground Control (Santa Monica); Village; Suma; Soundcastle (Los Angeles); Larabee and Smoke Tree Ranch (Palm Springs); Hit Factory (New York City); Dolphin Sound (Honolulu); Twilight Sound (Boston)
- Genre: Progressive pop
- Length: 37:20
- Labels: Sire; Reprise
- Producers: Brian Wilson; Andy Paley; Russ Titelman; Lenny Waronker; Jeff Lynne

Brian Wilson chronology
Brian Wilson (1988)	I Just Wasn't Made for These Times (1995)

Singles from Brian Wilson
- 1. "Love and Mercy" Released: July 1, 1988; 2. "Melt Away" Released: January 19, 1989

Brian Wilson is the debut solo album by American musician Brian Wilson, released on July 12, 1988, through Sire and Reprise Records. Promoted as a spiritual successor to the Beach Boys' 1966 release Pet Sounds, the album is characterized for its Phil Spector–influenced orchestrations, elaborate vocal harmonies, and use of digital synthesizers. It was reported to cost over $1 million to record and was the first album produced by Wilson since The Beach Boys Love You (1977).

The album was recorded over the course of a year across 11 studios. It was written and produced mainly by Wilson alongside Sire staff producers Andy Paley and Russ Titelman. Wilson's songwriting partner and former psychologist Eugene Landy, whose aides were a constant disruptive presence during the sessions, was credited as "executive producer". The record included the eight-minute closing track "Rio Grande", which saw Wilson revisiting a more experimental approach in the form of an Old West-themed suite. Among the album's guest contributors were Nick Laird-Clowes, Jeff Lynne, Elliot Easton, Philippe Saisse, Christopher Cross, and Terence Trent D'Arby. Two singles were issued: "Love and Mercy" and "Melt Away".

Brian Wilson was critically acclaimed but sold moderately, reaching number 54 in the U.S. and failing to chart in the UK. The LP's release was largely overshadowed by the controversy surrounding Landy's therapeutic practice and the success of the Beach Boys' "Kokomo", released the same month. A follow-up album, Sweet Insanity, was co-produced with Landy but never officially released. Wilson continued recording with Paley after disassociating from Landy in 1991, but did not release another solo album consisting of new original material until Imagination (1998).

== Background ==
Wilson stated in a 1976 interview that he had considered the Beach Boys' albums Pet Sounds (1966) and Friends (1968) to be his first solo albums. Officially, he had one solo record to his name, the 1966 single "Caroline, No", which had sold poorly. In the mid-1970s, he had approached Warner Bros. Records about producing a solo album, but it never happened, ostensibly because he had rejected the company's proposed budget. His last released production effort was the 1977 album The Beach Boys Love You, which, despite being credited to the Beach Boys, was recorded and performed almost entirely by Wilson alone. (Note: In 1977, Wilson produced Adult/Child, the intended follow-up to Love You, but it was never released.) During the recording of Love You, in December 1976, Wilson told a journalist that he had desired a solo career, but feared that "it would split the group up too much". He stated in a 1988 interview that he "should have" recorded a true solo album long ago, but had lacked "the confidence or the discipline".

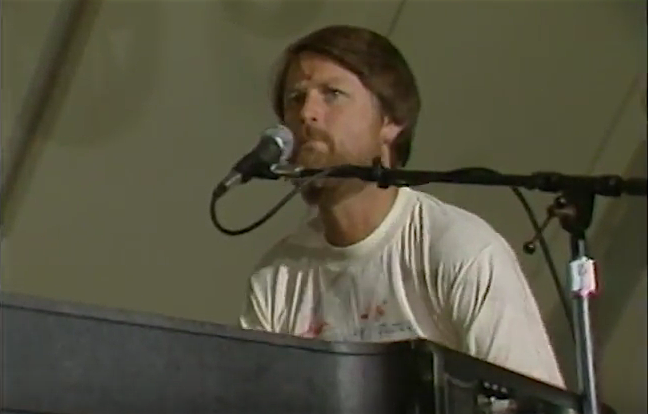
Wilson performing with the Beach Boys in June 1983, several months after he had signed into psychologist Eugene Landy's rehabilitation program.

From 1977 to 1982, Wilson entered a period of regression marked by overeating, drug abuse, erratic behavior, and at least one extended stay at a psychiatric facility. The group's efforts to keep Wilson at the production helm were unsuccessful, and at the end of 1982, his family, bandmates, and management prevailed upon him to volunteer back into psychologist Eugene Landy's "24-hours-a-day" therapy program. In short time, Landy's role extended to being Wilson's creative and financial partner. As his recovery consolidated, Wilson actively participated in the recording of his band's self-titled 1985 album The Beach Boys, produced by Steve Levine. Following this, Wilson, under Landy's auspices, stopped working with his bandmates on a regular basis in order to focus on launching a solo career. According to Landy, this was because Wilson's bandmates "didn't appreciate his gift nor were they able to see that he was back and once again able to take over."

At the suggestion of biographer David Leaf, in May 1986, Landy agreed to let Wilson's early songwriting partner Gary Usher collaborate on Wilson's planned solo album. Wilson and Usher subsequently wrote and recorded demos at Usher's studio, producing a collection of recordings that came to be known as "the Wilson Project". They recorded about a dozen songs in varying stages of completion, most of which remain unreleased. Due to Landy's persistent interference, which often involved revising the lyrics of their songs, the project was abandoned after June 1987.

In January 1987, Sire Records president Seymour Stein invited Wilson to act as a presenter for Leiber and Stoller's induction into the Rock and Roll Hall of Fame. Impressed by Wilson's healthier demeanor and his onstage a cappella rendition of "On Broadway", Stein met with Wilson during the ceremonial dinner and offered him a two-album solo deal. Several weeks later, they reconvened at Wilson's Malibu home, where Stein was played "about sixty" of Wilson's new songs and decided on eighteen to record. One of Stein's stipulations was to assign his own choice of co-producer for Wilson, and in turn, Landy negotiated to be allowed an "executive producer" credit. Stein recruited staff producer Andy Paley, a Boston-based multi-instrumentalist and Beach Boys fanatic who had previously produced albums for Jonathan Richman. Paley and Wilson immediately went to work.

== Production ==
=== Collaborators ===
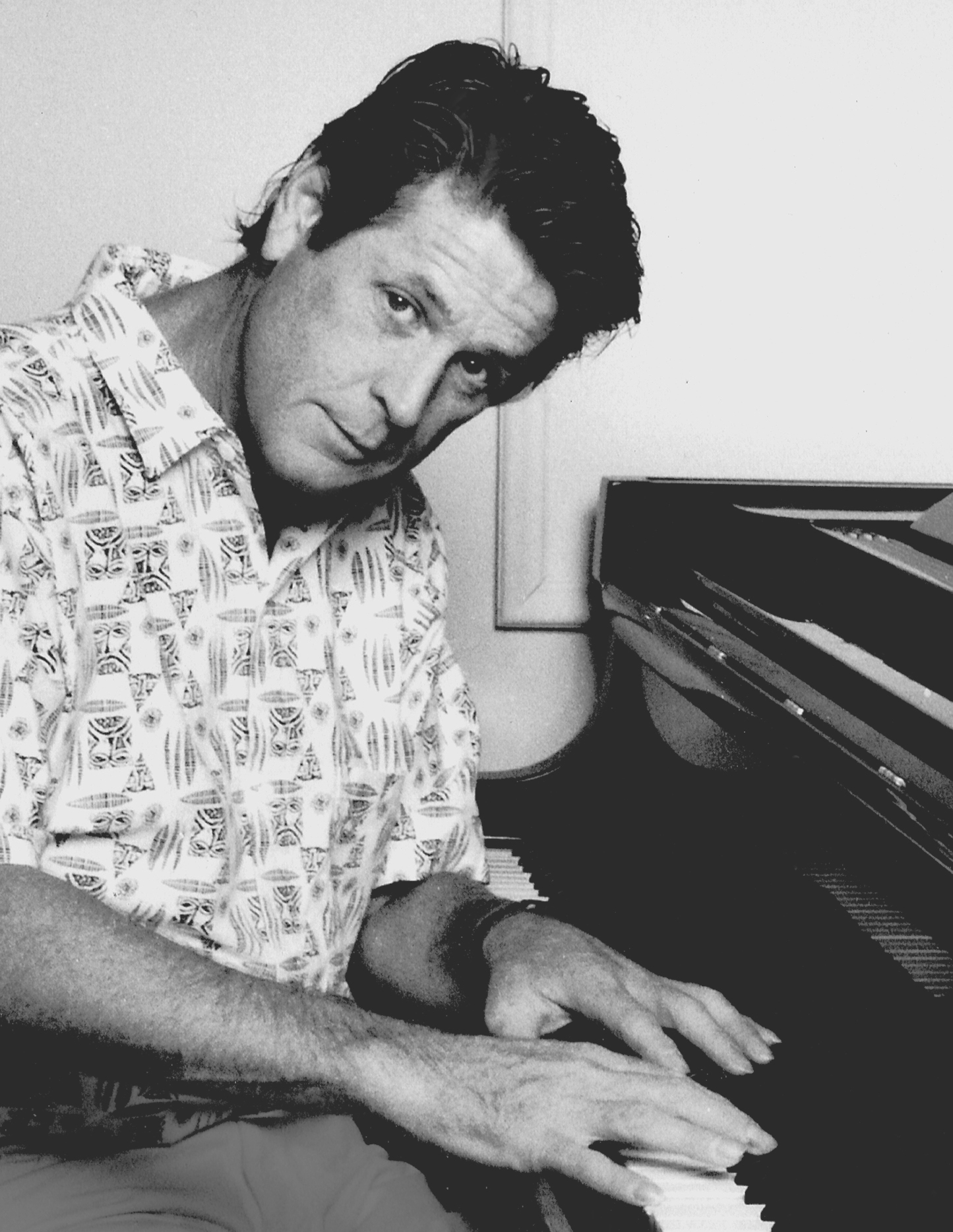
Wilson in the studio, 1990

Paley, as he himself described, was assigned to the project "to kick [Brian] in the ass and get him going", as well as to evaluate material for Stein and Lenny Waronker, the latter of whom being the president of Sire's distributor, Warner Bros. Records. As was typical for Wilson's previous collaborators – namely, Tony Asher and Van Dyke Parks – Paley usually met Wilson at his home and spent time together chatting or doing some other activity for inspiration before working on songs. They were not composing together until, Paley said, "Brian realized I could play a number of instruments, [after which] we started jamming and then writing music together to flesh out the songs."

Wilson recalled that, between 1982 and 1986, he had been unusually prolific as a songwriter and composed at his piano at least once a day. "We had 130 songs, then weeded it down to 20. We recorded 18 of those and chose 11 out of the 18". He and Paley trawled through three briefcases filled with tapes containing nearly 170 mostly unrecorded songs he had written. By Paley's account, there was "great stuff", but also many songs that he termed "hamburger songs" in reference to stories about Dennis Wilson, in the early 1980s, enticing Brian to write songs with McDonald's hamburgers. Paley said, "I could tell Brian if he was repeating himself in any of his stuff by incorporating some tiny thing from an obscure old tune. I kept him honest with himself as well as looking forward." In turn, Wilson said of Paley, "He's a real swift guy. Real fast. A very brainy guy. He puts a lot behind it, let's put it that way. He's a scary guy when you get right down to it."

Other producers, including Waronker and Russ Titelman, were soon involved. Both of them had worked with Wilson in the past; in Titelman's case, he and Wilson had written the songs "Sherry She Needs Me" and "Guess I'm Dumb" in the mid-1960s before becoming a staff producer at Warner Bros. According to Titelman, he got involved with the project after several months had passed and Wilson and Paley had produced only six "sloppy sketches" of incomplete songs. (Note: Landy stated that Titelman was recruited after Wilson had complained that the album did not sound "modern" enough". White identifies Titelman's role in the album as ensuring "technical excellence in the CD age". Titelman told Mark Dillon that his role in the project was to maintain a positive, creative, and focused atmosphere in the studio.) He said that Wilson "used to be a benevolent dictator in the studio; now, his ideas are great, but he needs someone to help organize those ideas." Waronker stated, "Each song had moments, but they needed help. But Brian had all the inspiration. All Russ did was make it stand up, make it be a record."

Waronker had been the Beach Boys' A&R representative at Warner–Reprise. In the words of biographer Mark Dillon, the project was "so important to Sire" that Waronker got "hands-on". (Note: Carlin writes that Stein and Waronker were "so wrapped up in the micro-details of Brian's recording sessions that many of their other tasks [were] left undone for months." A Warner executive told Rolling Stone during the album's making, "For the past six months, we've practically been a record company without a president. Lenny has been so preoccupied with the Brian Wilson album.") He implored Wilson to produce something akin to the extended, modular recording style that he had adopted with Smile in the late 1960s. Waronker recalled, "I told Seymour that to not have Brian do one of the more experimental things he used to do before he went into hibernation would be, well, ridiculous." However, Wilson had formed an aversion to this approach due to the fact that his personal decline in the late 1960s and early 1970s had coincided with the "diminishing commercial reception" to his more experimental recording output. Waronker had initially envisioned the album as "a new age record [with] a bunch of things like 'Cool, Cool Water". (Note: This had been a longtime dream for Waronker, as he had once remarked, "If I ever get the opportunity to produce Brian, I'd encourage him to do something that combined the vividness of 'Good Vibrations' with the non-commercial gentleness of 'Cool, Cool Water'.) Instead of forming the entire album around such a concept, they compromised with just one song of an extended length, "Rio Grande", the only track on the album whose recording Waronker personally attended.

The album featured a host of guest appearances from acts including the Cars' guitarist Elliot Easton, jazz keyboardist Philippe Saisse, singers Christopher Cross and Terence Trent D'Arby, among others. (Note: As reported in a contemporary article from Rolling Stone, Bob Dylan, Van Dyke Parks, and Harry Nilsson were additionally discussed as potential collaborators.) Following the release, some writers and fan publications implied that Wilson's songs were ghostwritten by the other producers and musicians, or that he was forced into writing the songs. In response to such accusations, Paley stated that the listed credits were indeed inaccurate, and that "there were a lot of people helping on that record", but that his and Wilson's writing was in no way contrived. Paley added, "the guy is always writing songs anyway, it's not like someone has to tell him to do it."

=== Session difficulties and credits discrepancies ===
Landy was always checking in, phoning in directors, basically never wanting to give Brian any breathing room. It was a hassle and many times heart-breaking because we'd do something good, finally, and then Landy would swoop in and dive-bomb it.

— Co-producer Andy Paley

Landy's aides, nicknamed the "Surf Nazis", were a constant disruptive presence, and creative differences between Landy and the rest of the production team occurred throughout the album's making. His assistant, Kevin Leslie, watched over Wilson at all times in the studio, while Landy himself regularly phoned to check on what track they were recording and to instruct Wilson to work on something else. Landy would also frequently confiscate the master tapes once a day's work had been finished. Stein, who characterized the album's recording as "hell on earth", said that Landy would then send back the wrong master tapes, "just to drive Russ crazy".

Titelman said of Landy, "He kept Brian off guard all the time [...] interrupting the creative flow and it was unbelievably frustrating. I started to go out of my mind. It was so chaotic and unpleasant that it became rather untenable." Landy acknowledged, "Titelman and I were always nose to nose, pushing, pushing, pushing. Russ Titelman is not my favorite person. But I must give him his honest due. [...] Russ has to be congratulated for having the balls to stand up to Brian and Dr. Landy [sic]."

Biographer Peter Ames Carlin reported that Landy's meetings with Stein, Waronker, and Titelman had often "devolved into screaming matches". During the vocal sessions to one song, one of Landy's aides bribed Wilson with a milkshake in exchange for him to sing alternate lyrics written by Landy and his girlfriend, Alexandra Morgan. The team stopped communicating through the studio intercom system after it was discovered that Landy's aides were using it to eavesdrop on sessions from another room. Paley remarked, "Anything good we got out of those sessions was done totally on stolen time."

Paley indicated that the official writing and production credits for Brian Wilson are inaccurate. Near the album's release, Landy had fought to be awarded songwriting credits on certain tracks while removing songwriting and production credits from others. According to Paley, the musician, writing, and production credits became "all inaccurate", and he himself remains uncredited for several of the album's tracks.

=== Recording ===
Brian Wilson was largely recorded at Ground Control Studios in Santa Monica from April to late spring 1987. After Titelman was recruited in June, the album was essentially completed by December. The sessions were held across eleven studios in Los Angeles, New York, Honolulu, and Boston. Mark Linett was recruited as engineer, a role he ultimately kept for the rest of Wilson's solo records.

Critic David Fricke noted that "the rich, expansive arrangements echo the orchestral radiance of Wilson's spiritual mentor, Phil Spector." Synthesizers are a major presence on the album, with Wilson employing samples, sound effects, keyboards, and percussion. Wilson said of his recording process, "I would overdub, I'd play all the keyboard stuff, and then I'd have my right hand, my assistant producer Andy Paley, play the guitar, and bass, and drums–he can play four instruments, piano too. Which is great." Programmer Michael Bernard was closely involved with some of the tracks. Bernard recalled, "The way [Brian] would go about layering things, his choice of sounds and instrument was different from what I was used to, but it was really interesting to watch him work. Most people put down drums, bass and chords first, but Brian might go from the drums to horns to strings to a lead vocal."

Production costs were reported to exceed $1 million (equivalent to $2.72 million in 2025). However, it is unclear if that figure is truly accurate; in a contemporary article, Wilson mentioned that the cost was $800,000, while Paley cited $1 million. Waronker disputed both of those figures, saying that $1 million was "a tremendous overstatement". Titelman blamed the overages on Landy's unusual practices. Writing in his Beach Boys biography, Timothy White states that "Landy would change studios every few weeks so Brian would not, in the words of one production staff member, 'form any lasting new professional relationships.'"

After an extended Christmas holiday, the album was mixed by engineer Hugh Padgham of Peter Gabriel and the Police fame. Landy then remixed the work, although Titelman stated that Waronker prevented Landy from making significant alterations, adding "It pretty much sounds the way the original mix sounded." White reports that a discarded remix, arranged by Landy, had been "heavily accented by strings and other intensely lush touches à la Murry Wilson". Brian Wilson took over a year to record – four times the span of time it took to record Pet Sounds.

== Content ==
=== Side one ===
==== "Love and Mercy" ====
Beginning of "Love and Mercy"
Sample of "Love and Mercy".

"Love and Mercy", "an anthem about love and compassion", was inspired by the 1965 song "What the World Needs Now Is Love". Wilson referred to the song as "probably the most spiritual" he had ever written. He explained that the song "has a lot of intrinsic meaning in my personal life", because when he took LSD in the 1960s, he "developed a Jesus Christ complex", and "this song probably best exemplifies the Christ that's in me. The part that wants to give love to people".

==== "Walkin' the Line" ====
"Walkin' the Line" is the only track from the Wilson Project that made it onto Brian Wilson. Wilson said that the song was built around an old bass line he had composed, and that the lyrics are about how he is "always walking over thin ice, could fall through at any minute. I tread lightly on everything I do, 'Walk The Line' so to speak. Not all the time, but it is one of my subtheme songs of my whole life, [but] it’s not a serious song." Carlin describes it as "stompingly rhythmic" and "another of Brian's deceptively autobiographical songs, combining the percussive sound of footsteps, drums, sleigh bells, synth bass, synthesizer, electric guitars, and three layers of interlocking voices into a description of his own impossibly rigid life".

Landy said the lyrics describe "walking the line between sanity and insanity, walking the line between wanting to talk to this girl and being too scared to." Waronker had invited Nick Laird-Clowes, singer and guitarist of the Dream Academy, to work with Wilson on the album, but Laird-Clowes' contributions were ultimately limited to modifying the verse melody of "Walkin' the Line".

==== "Melt Away" ====
Verse and bridge of "Melt Away"
Sample of "Melt Away".

"Melt Away", according to Wilson, is "about the identity crisis I have in my life – the way I see myself and the ‘me’ that everybody thinks I am." The couplet "I feel just like an island / until I see you smilin'" was improvised by Wilson during the vocal session after Titelman had asked for a lyric revision to the song. Paley felt that the line is a highlight: "He was under pressure, but what he came up with was just such a beautiful, cool twist."

The track recalls elements of the Pet Sounds track "God Only Knows". Carlin explained that both songs contain sleigh bells and "percussive blasts of snare", however, "Melt Away" blends it "into an entirely different feeling, with words that emphasized the scars of experience while the interweaving paths of the bass and melody conspired with the billowing ooohs and aaahs to describe the soothing balm of love."

==== "Baby Let Your Hair Grow Long" ====
"Baby Let Your Hair Grow Long" is a spiritual sequel to Wilson's "Caroline, No" that implores a woman to regain her innocence by growing out her hair. Wilson called it a "romantic sexual song", explaining that he had intended for it to be a love song, "but then I put in a couple of sexual lines." Asked if he was singing to the same woman as in "Caroline, No", Wilson responded, "No, it’s still the same mood. That mood is sexual."

Regarding the lyric "I can't wait to see that change in you / You can do it just the way you used to do", Carlin notes that Wilson sings the line in falsetto, "just the way he used to do". Biographer David Leaf surmised that the line may have been inspired by "an old friend urging Brian to pick up his Fender bass, to 'do it the way you used to do.'"

==== "Little Children" ====
"Little Children" was originally demoed during the sessions for The Beach Boys Love You in 1976. (Note: A recording of the Love You demo of "Little Children" was released as a downloadable track on Wilson's website in 2021.) Wilson said that the song is "about how little children are marching along" and that it has "a playful sound to it, a background track of a youthful nature." He goes on to say that he had intended for the song to convince listeners that "little kids are really cool .. there’s no responsibility when you’re a kid, and I admire the freedom from responsibility that kids have. I’m jealous of it … That track was done as an attempt to make people feel younger."

According to Carlin, "Little Children" is a "calliope-like dash through Brian's dreamy/nightmarish reflections on childhood." Fricke referred to the track as having a "bright, Spectoresque sparkle" likely influenced by "Da Doo Ron Ron" (1964) and "Mountain of Love" (1960). (Note: "Mountain of Love" was one of the songs recorded for Beach Boys' Party! (1965).)

==== "One for the Boys" ====
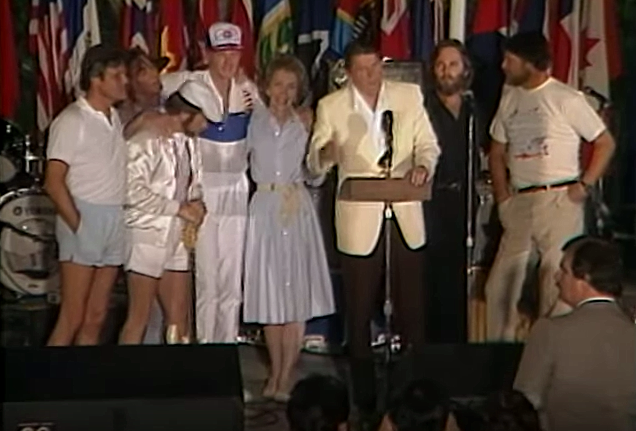
Wilson with his bandmates and Ronald and Nancy Reagan, 1983

"One for the Boys", originally titled "There We Were", is an a capella piece that was named as a gesture toward Wilson's bandmates. Asked for his "intent" behind the piece, Wilson responded, "The intent was to bring a kind of harmonic beauty to it [...] to change it right in the middle of the album. To bring about a change of vibration. A change of sound. A prettier sound. Something more beautiful."" On another occasion, he called the piece "a love song that has feminine characteristics", as well as "the feminine side of me". Paley stated that he composed the "little movements in the middle" but his contributions were not honored with a writing credit.

==== "There's So Many" ====
"There's So Many" has a similar celestial/romantic-themed focus as Wilson's "Solar System" from The Beach Boys Love You. He described the song as "about this guy who has a lot of different girls he could think of [...] You wonder why you lose a girl and two months later you're with another girl and his girl got mad at you. And the guy gets all fucked up about it, and he winds up with an ego problem over it."

Wilson felt that the "planets are spinning around" portion of the song was "probably the most spiritual part of the whole album". Titelman remembered that after Wilson had overdubbed the backing vocals, "He leaned over to me and said, 'Yeah, who needs the fuckin' Beach Boys!'" Bernard said, "On 'There's So Many,' the part where Brian sings 'The planets are spinning around.' He asked me 'What kind of sound could we put there to give you the feeling that the planets really are spinning around?' We came up with this light chime which sounds almost like a windchime; it gives a motion effect to the song when you hear it."

=== Side two ===
==== "Night Time" ====
"Night Time" is a rock song. Wilson told a journalist in 1987 that he had considered titling the album Nighttime, "which has always been the time of day I like best." Paley stated that the song was a "50:50 collaboration" in which he wrote the verse and Wilson wrote the chorus.

==== "Let It Shine" ====
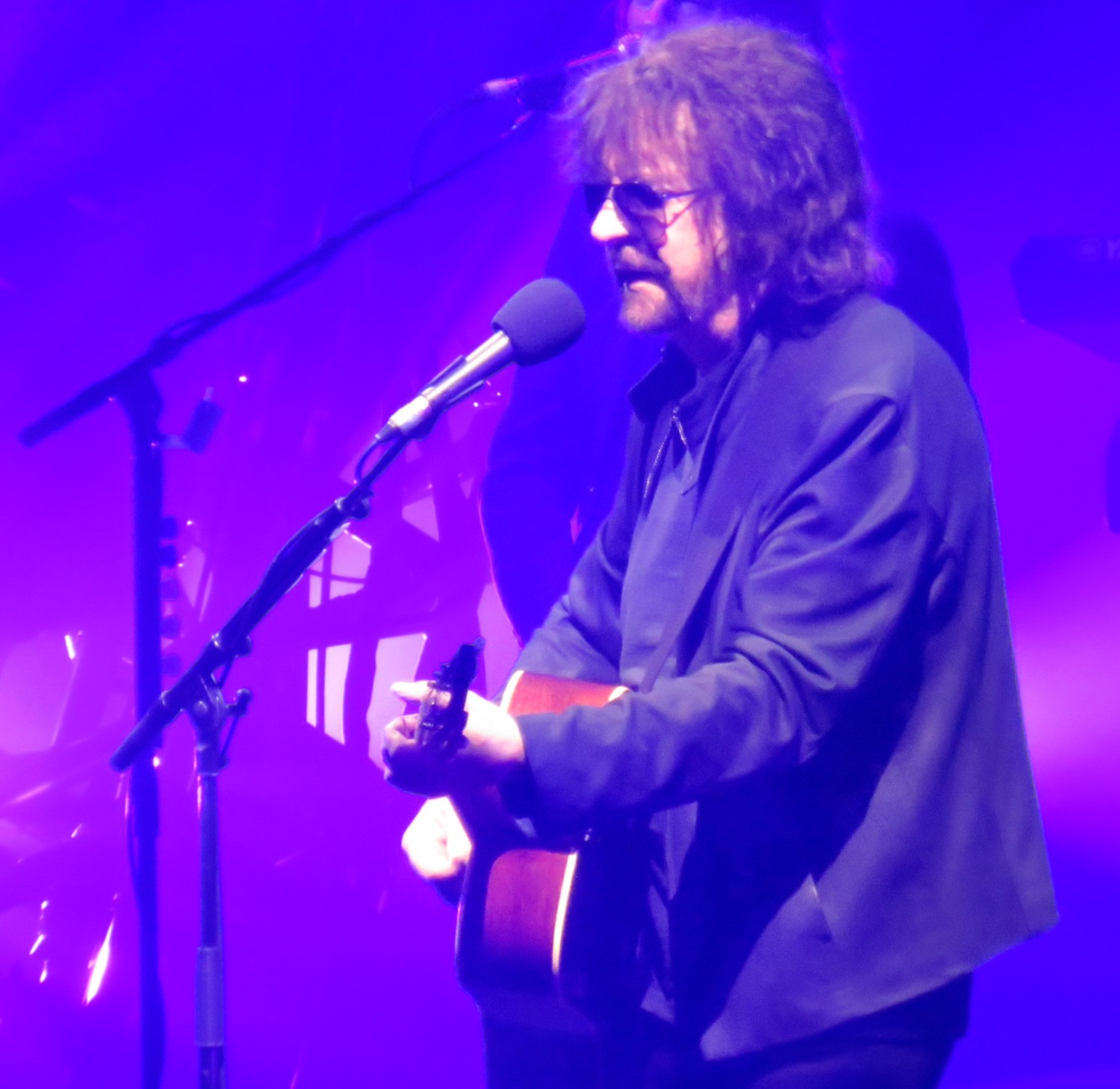
Jeff Lynne produced and co-wrote "Let It Shine"

"Let It Shine" was written with Jeff Lynne, co-founder of the Electric Light Orchestra. Wilson stated that his main writing contribution to the song was the intro and some of the lyrics. According to biographers Andrew Doe and John Tobler, Wilson "allegedly intensely disliked the track". Carlin bemoaned that Lynne "dominated" the song so much that "it sounded more like an Electric Light Orchestra outtake than a new Brian Wilson tune."

In a 2015 interview, Lynne explained, "I hadn't known him at all, but Brian asked me if I wanted to write a song and produce it with him. 'Yes, please – I’d love to.' [...] Despite our production backgrounds, there wasn’t a lot on it actually. It’s a nice tight-sounding record. Lynne devised a bass line, he said, "which went from the highest letter on the grid right down to the bottom E or A string, and [Brian] walked in while I was doing it. He stared at me and said, 'That's the longest goddam bass string I’ve ever seen!' I was quite pleased with that!"

==== "Meet Me in My Dreams Tonight" ====
"Meet Me in My Dreams Tonight" was co-credited to Andy Dean, one of Paley's acquaintances, although this credit elicited confusion from Paley, who called it another "50:50 collaboration" between himself and Wilson. Wilson supported, "Andy Paley and I wrote that one. It's a very special tune. It;s about a dream lover, a similar idea to the Bobby Darin song. It's about a guy and a girl who love each other on a certain level that’s higher than real life. A fantasy song … We wanted to get the sound like 'Sweet Talkin' Guy,' that kind of '60s feeling in a record in the '80s."

Landy wrote an alternate lyric to the song that mentioned a "love attack", and commanded Wilson to record a vocal with those lyrics, but it was ultimately discarded. According to Carlin, "Landy had forbidden the engineers from even mixing the original 'Meet Me in My Dreams,' but when he flew to Hawaii one morning for a vacation, they lured the day's bodyguard out of the studio for a Ping-Pong game, mixing the original lyrics into the tune when he was down the hall. Once that version made the rounds of the executives at Sire, Landy's 'love attack' was never heard from again."

==== "Rio Grande" ====
"Take Me Home" excerpt from "Rio Grande"
Wilson said of "Rio Grande", "Lenny wanted me to get a little bit into that kind of Smile bag, and I did."

"Rio Grande" is an eight-minute long Old West-themed suite, written by Wilson and Paley, that was inspired by the films Red River (1948) and Rio Grande (1950). It presents a series of episodic music segments meant to illustrate a trip across an American frontier. According to Paley, "Brian was really into writing this as a survival thing, the idea of a little man against the big men and making it on your own … the misunderstandings that must have happened between travelers on the same trail and how scary that must have been."

Wilson's favorite part of the song was the "Take Me Home" section. He explained that the narrator of the song "has so many obstacles that he just wants to go home. He wants to run away from all that stuff and go back to his home, wherever that might be, [like] in the sky. That’s symbolism, right? God cannot be conceived of, so therefore we give him a literal meaning that he’s in the sky, so that people can understand what is being said."

The piece is the result of Waronker's efforts to get Wilson to produce something more experimental. Waronker remembered “literally begging him to forget the pop ditties and ‘song’ songs. There were different times I talked to Brian about this. Brian would say ‘OK,’ and he would have a concept, like 'California,' but when he played it for me, it always ended up being a conventional song.” Landy acknowledged, "'Rio Grande' is 20% of the album, and it isn't something you can dance to. Lenny should be congratulated for pushing Brian in that direction."

== Non-album singles and unreleased songs ==
"Let's Go to Heaven in My Car", co-written with Usher, was issued as a single and appeared on the soundtrack of the film Police Academy 4 in March 1987. "Doin' Time on Planet Earth" was written for the 1988 film of the same name, but the song was rejected; and subsequently issued as a B-side under the title "Being with the One You Love".

"He Couldn't Get His Old Body to Move" was co-written and co-produced by Lindsey Buckingham, but ultimately relegated as the B-side to the "Love and Mercy" single. Wilson called it "an exercise message song [...] all about how you can exercise because you can stay alive longer and how you should move around instead of sitting in a chair feeling hypnotized." Landy said that the song "came out of [Brian] sending me tapes about how you’ve got to get your body to move" at a time when Wilson could only communicate to him via recorded cassette tapes. "Too Much Sugar", the B-side of "Let's Go to Heaven in My Car", is another song that was based around the idea of physical health. Wilson remarked that the two songs were "way ahead of their time, lyrically. You would think people would write more about health." (Note: Wilson had previously written numerous songs on that theme, including "Vegetables, "H.E.L.P. Is On the Way", and "Life Is for the Living".)

All four outtakes mentioned above were included as bonus tracks on the album's 2000 CD reissue. John Sebastian was tapped to co-write a song with Wilson, but it was never completed due to a lyrical dispute from Landy and Morgan. "Terri, She Needs Me", co-produced by Titelman, was similarly left unfinished due to Landy's interference. "Let's Do It Again" was described by Wilson as "a semi-commercial kind of song, a nowadays kind of song". It was included on an early assembly of the album. In 2021, "Terri, She Needs Me", "Let's Do It Again", "So Long" (also known as "Angel"), and "I Feel This Love" were released as free downloadable tracks on Wilson's website.

Other still-unreleased recordings from the album's sessions include "Heavenly Lover", "Love Ya", "Saturday Evening in the City", "Tiger's Eye", and "Hotter". "Heavenly Lover" originated as an unused section of "Rio Grande". "Tiger's Eye", according to Paley, is "about a guy who's worried about his girlfriend in the jungle and he's trying to find her; it's got a scary mood to it, but it's got a Motown feel, and a nice climbing bass line in the bridge that I remember. It's spooky, but he's saying 'Don't Worry'. It's like 'Running Bear and Little White Dove'."

== Release ==
There's always a craziness surrounding the recording and release of an important new album by a big-name artist. But in nearly 20 years of writing about such things I have never witnessed or heard of anything quite like this. [...] A lot of people are very nuts over this event.

— Contrast magazine, 1988

Music journalist David Cavanagh characterized Brian Wilson as "one of the longest awaited [albums] in rock 'n' roll history". He wrote that, for people unfamiliar with Wilson, the album's release was not particularly noteworthy, but for Beach Boys fans, it was on the level of John Lennon's 1980 comeback. Lead single "Love and Mercy" was issued on July 1, 1988 and failed to chart. The album was released on July 12 and reached number 54 in the U.S. while failing to chart in the UK. In its first week of release, Brian Wilson sold 250,000 copies and had 7,500 orders unfulfilled. According to the Los Angeles Times, the album had sold "too well", as demand had outpaced supply. It ultimately sold about 480,000 copies, just 20,000 short of a gold record certification.

To promote the album, an extraordinarily elaborate press kit containing historical summaries of the album's making and Wilson's life was mailed to various entertainment media outlets. Landy arranged for Wilson to appear on television programs, including Late Night with David Letterman, where he performed "Night Time". Carlin describes Wilson as having performed "in tight leather pants, lurching across the stage with all the grace of a traffic cop whose jockey shorts have caught on fire." There, and in his other public appearances, Carlin states that Wilson was "too obviously terrified, his hands shaking, and his eyes darting around like a guy with fear in his heart and ghosts on his mind."

The album's release was largely overshadowed by the controversies surrounding Landy, coupled with the surprise success of the Beach Boys' single "Kokomo", released that same month. Several months earlier, the California Attorney General's office had filed suit against Landy with regards to the overlap between his therapeutic services and business interests. Carlin states that it is uncertain whether "the thrum of controversy helped or hindered the buzz surrounding the album", although Stein and Waronker believed that it did. Dillon attributed the album's commercial failure partly to the lack of a music video for the lead single.

In August 1988, Rolling Stone reported that Wilson had "half of a second album written" and that there were discussions about "producing both The Beach Boys and the Ramones", as well as a solo tour. In September, Wilson, accompanied by Landy, appeared at that year's Beach Boy Stomp fan convention, held at a church hall in Greenford, a West London suburb. Wilson sang and performed three songs on an electric piano, after which he sat at a table and signed autographs for the attendees. Cavanagh wrote, "He arrived and the audience of 250 Beach Boys disciples behaved as if the Second Coming had taken place [...] Attempts to engage him in meaningful conversation were mostly a failure, but he sat there for over an hour signing his name." The album's second single, "Melt Away", was issued in January 1989 and also failed to chart.

== Contemporary reviews ==
Contemporary professional ratings
Review scores
Source	Rating
Los Angeles Times	4/4 stars
Rolling Stone	4/5 stars

Brian Wilson was critically acclaimed and had a near-unanimous positive reception. Titelman touted the album as Pet Sounds '88, which Carlin states "didn't seem terribly outlandish [...] to everyone who had heard the album". In Stereo Review, the writer stated that Brian Wilson confirmed that the artist had successfully delivered "Pet Sounds II" and was "clearly at work again with talent intact". Rolling Stone's David Fricke concurred and wrote, "Brian Wilson is a stunning reminder of what pop's been missing all these years [and] the best Beach Boys long player since 1970's Sunflower", with his only criticism being that the LP appeared to lack "a real statement of direction or purpose". The magazine named Wilson the "comeback artist of the year". NME's year-end lists ranked Brian Wilson and "Love and Mercy" among the best albums and tracks of 1988. In The Village Voice's annual Pazz & Jop critics' poll for the year's best albums, the album finished at number 12, though according to the poll's editor, Robert Christgau, had the first two days worth of late ballot submissions "made our deadline, Brian Wilson would have finished not 12th but sixth."

Los Angeles Times' Paul Grein wrote that Brian Wilson makes "a strong case for the argument that genius isn’t a perishable commodity". Sun-Sentinel's Deborah Wilker rued: "Wilson's clever, mostly upbeat ideas flow magnificently throughout the record, easily transcending his emotional madness." Less favorably, the Associated Press's David Bauder wrote that "Brian Wilson can't compare with any of the early '60s Beach Boys classics", while People's Ralph Novak described the record as "often appalling".

== Retrospective assessments ==
Retrospective professional ratings
Review scores
Source	Rating
AllMusic	3/5 stars
Robert Christgau	B−
Entertainment Weekly	A
MusicHound Rock	3.5/5 stars
The Rolling Stone Album Guide	2/5 stars

Gary Pig Gold, in MusicHound Rock: The Essential Album Guide, wrote that the album would disappoint listeners expecting a Pet Sounds-quality masterpiece, however, "That is not to say Wilson isn't still capable of producing works of true beauty; his flair for both vocal and instrumental arrangement remains unparalleled, his voice is now more mature but still as achingly expressive as it was in its prime, and magnificent melodies still seem to spill from him with impossible ease." Conversely, Robert Christgau wrote that Wilson sounds too much "like the sincere, talented, mildly pretentious nut he is" to convince the listener of "the pain in his voice". Furthermore, he believed the record suffered from "a collective Phil Spector obsession [that] comes off incredibly labored."

Common criticisms against the album relate to the predominant use of "synthesizers and drum machines dated even for its time". Writing in AllMusic, Richie Unterberger referred to the album's use of the Yamaha DX7 in particular. Unterberger elaborated, "While he retained his gift for catchy melodies and dense, symphonic production, there was a forced stiffness to both the songwriting and execution. Much of the blame for the album's mixed success can be laid upon its sterile, synthesizer-laden arrangements and echoing percussion, which epitomized some of the less attractive aspects of late-1980s production." The Rolling Stone Album Guide concurred that the "dated synth-heavy production makes the album almost unlistenable", but evidence for the fact "that his songwriting muse has not abandoned him completely" can be found in "Love and Mercy", "Melt Away", and "Baby Let Your Hair Grow Long".

Among Wilson's biographers, Carlin writes that the album occupies a space "between moments of sweet, redemptive beauty and songs that were overwhelmed by their own ambition, to some that actually did combine the tacts of the past with the tools of the present into a wholly new sound. And then there were a few that seemed either so out of character or so desperate to be in character that they sounded like the product of extremely talented forgers." Dillon writes that "The vocal arrangements are at times overwhelming, the changes startling. It ranks among Brian's most ambitious works, recalling past glories without recycling them." Jon Stebbins wrote, "After the initial euphoria had subsided [...] most realized that the album was a somewhat stilted and mechanical effort."

== Aftermath and legacy ==
[The album] succeeded at giving Brian Wilson the forward-looking perspective of a legitimate comeback. Brian had finally delivered on his oft-given promise to "really stretch out and blow some minds" with his sheer ambition. When the needle finally lifted at the end of side two, it was easy to imagine that he really might be back on his journey to the distant frontier.

— Biographer Peter Ames Carlin

Among the other members of the Beach Boys, their manager Tom Hulett reported in a 1988 interview that Wilson's bandmates had been supportive of his endeavor. "I gave the album to each of them, and they were tickled to hear it. They were all positive about it." Asked about the album in a 1992 interview, Wilson's bandmate and cousin Mike Love stated that he did not like it because of the lyrics, the non-"commercial" arrangements, and his opinion that "it sounded like shit compared to what [Brian] could sound like." (Note: Love saw the album as part of Landy's over-arching plan to "destroy" the Beach Boys and become "the sole custodian of Brian's career and legacy", as Love explained in his memoir, "Why would anyone bother with us, [Landy's] thinking apparently went, when the only Beach Boy who mattered was recording and performing on his own?" During a Beach Boys band meeting in August 1988, Love opined to Wilson, "I think I could have done a better job with you than Gene or anybody else on [the album's] concepts and lyrics".)

Reflecting on Brian Wilson, in a 1997 interview, Paley called it "a pretty good record [but] there were too many cooks and Brian wasn't really calling the shots." In Wilson's 2016 memoir, I Am Brian Wilson, it states, "I liked that record even though I didn’t like the circumstances of making it. It had some really great songs on it." A follow-up album, Sweet Insanity, was co-produced with Landy but never officially released. Wilson continued recording with Paley after disassociating from Landy in 1991, but did not release another solo album that consisted of new original material until Imagination (1998).

Wilson rerecorded "Love and Mercy" and "Melt Away" for the soundtrack to the 1995 documentary Brian Wilson: I Just Wasn't Made for These Times. After he began touring regularly at the end of the 1990s, he adopted a stripped-down version of "Love and Mercy" as his signature closing number at live concerts.

== Reissues and remix ==
In 2000, Sire reissued the album through Rhino/Atlantic Records. This edition of the album contained several remixes of the original tracks. It also included the addition of two non-album single tracks, two non-album B-sides, four demos, two alternate mixes, one instrumental, and four interview clips. A similar track listing was adopted for their 2015 reissue, with the only difference being that the "hidden track" was given dedicated space as track 26, "Brian Fan Club X-Mas Message".

== Influence ==
Japanese composers Hirokazu Tanaka and Keiichi Suzuki cited Brian Wilson as a major influence on their soundtracks for the video game Mother (1989) and its sequel EarthBound (1994). Tanaka recalled repeatedly listening to the album during his commute to Suzuki's home. "If I arrived a little early, I'd wander around the area listening to it. Personally, I think of MOTHER when I listen to this album".

== Track listing ==
Many of these writing and production credits have been disputed, and, following the album's 2000 reissue, credits to Landy and Morgan were removed. For historical purposes, all tracks are as they were originally credited, albeit with a strikethrough for credits that are no longer officially recognized.

Side one
No.	Title	Writer(s)	Producer(s)	Length
1.	"Love and Mercy"	Brian Wilson, ~~Eugene E. Landy~~, ~~Alexandra Morgan~~	Brian Wilson, Russ Titelman	2:52
2.	"Walkin' the Line"	Wilson, ~~Landy~~, ~~Morgan~~, Nick Laird-Clowes	Wilson	2:37
3.	"Melt Away"	Wilson, ~~Landy~~	Wilson, Titelman	2:58
4.	"Baby Let Your Hair Grow Long"	Wilson	Wilson, Titelman	3:15
5.	"Little Children"	Wilson	Wilson, Titelman	1:48
6.	"One for the Boys"	Wilson	Wilson	1:47
7.	"There's So Many"	Wilson, ~~Landy~~, ~~Morgan~~	Wilson, Titelman	2:46

Side two
No.	Title	Writer(s)	Producer(s)	Length
1.	"Night Time"	Wilson, ~~Landy~~, ~~Morgan~~, Andy Paley	Wilson, Titelman	3:34
2.	"Let it Shine"	Wilson, Jeff Lynne	Wilson, Jeff Lynne	3:57
3.	"Meet Me in My Dreams Tonight"	Wilson, Paley, Andy Dean	Wilson, Andy Paley	3:05
4.	"Rio Grande"	Wilson, Paley	Wilson, Lenny Waronker, Paley	8:12
Total length:				37:20

2000 CD bonus tracks
No.	Title	Writer(s)	Producer(s)	Length
12.	"Brian on "Love and Mercy""			2:23
13.	"He Couldn't Get His Poor Old Body to Move"	Lindsey Buckingham, Wilson	Wilson, Buckingham	2:36
14.	"Being with the One You Love"	Wilson	Wilson	2:36
15.	"Let's Go to Heaven in My Car"	Gary Usher, Wilson	Wilson	3:40
16.	"Too Much Sugar"	Wilson	Wilson	2:38
17.	"There's So Many" (demo)	Wilson	Wilson, Titelman	1:53
18.	"Walkin' the Line" (demo)	Wilson	Wilson, Usher	2:51
19.	"Melt Away" (early version – alternate vocal)	Wilson	Wilson, Titelman	2:03
20.	"Night Time" (instrumental track)	Paley, Wilson	Wilson, Titelman	4:05
21.	"Little Children" (demo)	Wilson	Wilson, Titelman	2:01
22.	"Night Bloomin' Jasmine" (demo)	Wilson	Wilson	2:20
23.	"Rio Grande" (early version – compiled rough mixes)	Paley, Wilson	Wilson, Paley, Waronker	6:07
24.	"Brian on "Rio Grande""			1:20
25.	"Brian on the Source" (includes hidden track)			1:59

== Personnel ==
Adapted from the 2000 CD deluxe edition liner notes.

- Brian Wilson – lead and backing vocals, piano, organ, keyboards, E-mu Emulator, vibraphone, bells, chimes, glockenspiel, percussion, sound effects, vocal arrangements

Guests

- Christopher Cross – additional backing vocals on "Night Time"
- Terence Trent D’Arby – additional backing vocals on "Walkin' the Line"
- Elliot Easton – guitar
- Kevin S. Leslie – footsteps
- Jeff Lynne – keyboards, bass, six-string bass, guitar
- Andy Paley – electric and acoustic guitars, bass, drums, percussion, keyboards, harmonica, additional backing vocals
- Philippe Saisse – keyboards, synthesizer programming
- Russ Titelman – additional backing vocals on "Walkin' the Line"

Additional players and session musicians

- Michael Andreas – flutes, saxophones
- The Bayside Bluegrass Band – mandolin, banjo, bass, steel-string acoustic guitar
- Michael Bernard – computers, synthesizer programming, drums, keyboards, percussion
- Stuart Blumberg – trumpet
- Jeff Bova – keyboards, programming
- Jimmy Bralower – drum programming, shaker
- Lance Buller – trumpet
- Robbie Condor – synthesizer programming, additional keyboards
- Andrew Dean – keyboards, vibes, percussion, synthesizer programming, jingle bells
- Todd Herreman – Fairlight
- Tris Imboden – drums, hi-hat, cymbals
- Hymen Katz – flute, piccolo
- Robbie Kilgore – keyboard programming
- Harry Kim – trumpet
- Steve Lindsey – synthesizer programming, additional keyboards
- Jay Migliori – baritone saxophone
- Frank Marocco – accordion
- Rob Mounsey – E-mu tympani, piano, synth guitar, Emulator cello
- Dean Parks – guitar
- Bob Riley – drum machine
- Tony Salvage – violin, saw
- Carol Steele – percussion
- Larry Williams – horn, saxophone solo, synthesizer programming, additional keyboards
- Mark Linett – recording and mix engineer

== Charts ==
Chart performance for Brian Wilson
Chart (1988)	Peak position
Australian Albums (ARIA)	39
Swedish Albums (Sverigetopplistan)	23
US Billboard Top Pop Albums	54

== Bibliography ==
- Abbott, Kingsley (1997). "Two Soulmates Touching in the Dark: Brian Wilson, Gary Usher and the Wilson Project". In Abbott, Kingsley (ed.). Back to the Beach: A Brian Wilson and the Beach Boys Reader (1st ed.). London: Helter Skelter. pp. 180–186. ISBN 978-1-900924-02-3.
- Badman, Keith (2004). The Beach Boys: The Definitive Diary of America's Greatest Band, on Stage and in the Studio. Backbeat Books. ISBN 978-0-87930-818-6.
- Carlin, Peter Ames (2006). Catch a Wave: The Rise, Fall, and Redemption of the Beach Boys' Brian Wilson. Rodale. ISBN 978-1-59486-320-2.
- Cavanagh, David (1989). The World's Greatest Rock 'n' Roll Scandals. London: Octopus Books. ISBN 0-7064-3878-7.
- Dillon, Mark (2012). Fifty Sides of the Beach Boys: The Songs That Tell Their Story. ECW Press. ISBN 978-1-77090-198-8.
- Doe, Andrew; Tobler, John (2004). Brian Wilson and the Beach Boys: The Complete Guide to Their Music. Omnibus. ISBN 9781844494262.
- Gaines, Steven (1986). Heroes and Villains: The True Story of The Beach Boys. New York: Da Capo Press. ISBN 0-306-80647-9.
- Holdship, Bill (1997) [1991]. "Bittersweet Insanity: The Fight for Brian Wilson's Soul". In Abbott, Kingsley (ed.). Back to the Beach: A Brian Wilson and the Beach Boys Reader (1st ed.). London: Helter Skelter. pp. 205–212. ISBN 978-1-900924-02-3.
- Love, Mike (2016). Good Vibrations: My Life as a Beach Boy. Penguin Publishing Group. ISBN 978-0-698-40886-9.
- McCulley, Jerry (1997) [1988]. "Trouble in Mind – A Revealing Interview with Brian Wilson". In Abbott, Kingsley (ed.). Back to the Beach: A Brian Wilson and the Beach Boys Reader (1st ed.). London: Helter Skelter. pp. 187–204. ISBN 978-1-900924-02-3.
- Priore, Domenic (1997). "What It's Really Like to Collaborate with Brian Wilson, Today! An Interview with Andy Paley". In Abbott, Kingsley (ed.). Back to the Beach: A Brian Wilson and the Beach Boys Reader (1st ed.). London: Helter Skelter. pp. 227–228. ISBN 978-1-900924-02-3.
- Stebbins, Jon (2000). Dennis Wilson: The Real Beach Boy. ECW Press. ISBN 978-1-55022-404-7.
- White, Timothy (1996). The Nearest Faraway Place: Brian Wilson, the Beach Boys, and the Southern Californian Experience. Macmillan. ISBN 0-333-64937-0.
- Wilson, Brian; Greenman, Ben (2016). I Am Brian Wilson: A Memoir. Da Capo Press. ISBN 978-0-306-82307-7.
