= Love and Mercy =

Single by Brian Wilson

from the album Brian Wilson
- B-side: "He Couldn't Get His Poor Old Body to Move"
- Released: July 1, 1988
- Recorded: April 1987 – February 1988
- Genre: Progressive pop
- Length: 2:56
- Label: Sire
- Songwriter: Brian Wilson
- Producers: Brian Wilson; Russ Titelman

Brian Wilson singles chronology
"Let's Go to Heaven in My Car" (1987)	"Love and Mercy" (1988)	"Melt Away" (1988)

Music video
- "Love and Mercy" on YouTube

Audio sample
- file; help

"Love and Mercy" is a song by the American musician Brian Wilson and the opening track from his 1988 album Brian Wilson. Co-produced by Russ Titelman, the song was released as a single on July 1, 1988, but failed to chart. Psychologist Eugene Landy and his girlfriend Alexandra Morgan were formerly listed as co-writers. Wilson characterized "Love and Mercy" as a semi-autobiographical song that exemplifies his own "Jesus Christ complex," or in other words, his compulsion to "give love to people". The song was influenced by the 1965 hit "What the World Needs Now Is Love."

Wilson rerecorded "Love and Mercy" for the soundtrack to the 1995 documentary Brian Wilson: I Just Wasn't Made for These Times. Since the late 1990s, it has been his closing number at his solo live concerts. Cover versions have been recorded by acts including Randy Stonehill and Wilco, as well as the Libera choir. The title was lifted for the 2014 biopic of Wilson's life.

== Background ==
"Love and Mercy" was originally credited to Brian Wilson, his psychologist Eugene Landy, and Landy's girlfriend Alexandra Morgan. Landy and Morgan's credits were removed following the album's 2000 reissue. Wilson stated that he "was in my piano room, playing 'What the World Needs Now,' and I just went into my own song ... worked very hard to get out what was in my heart on that one". He called it "probably the most spiritual song I've ever written." Co-producer Russ Titelman suggested the vocal counterpoints in the song and contributed a lyric, but declined to be honored with a songwriting credit.

== Lyrics ==
Wilson said of the song's meaning, "I would think love is a gentle thing and mercy would be more desperate, ultimately more desperately needed, thing in life. Mercy–a little break here and there for somebody who's having trouble." During a 1990 public appearance, he explained that the song "has a lot of intrinsic meaning in my personal life", because when he took LSD in the 1960s, he "developed a Jesus Christ complex", and "this song probably best exemplifies the Christ that's in me. The part that wants to give love to people".

The lyrics included an extra verse unused in the final edit: "I was praying to a god who just doesn't seem to hear / Oh, the blessings we need the most are what we all fear".

== Composition and recording ==
"Love and Mercy" features Wilson on lead vocals as well as a lot of the backing vocals, and is characterized by its pattern of descending chords. Wilson said, "I was going for a spiritual, semi-Beach Boy kind of background sound, but more of a Brian Wilson lead vocal thing."

== Release ==
"Love and Mercy" (backed with "He Couldn't Get His Poor Old Body to Move") was issued on July 1, 1988 and failed to chart. Biographer Mark Dillon attributed the commercial failure of Brian Wilson partly to the fact that no music video was produced for "Love and Mercy".

== Rerecording and live performances ==
Wilson rerecorded "Love and Mercy" for the soundtrack to the 1995 documentary Brian Wilson: I Just Wasn't Made for These Times. After he began touring regularly at the end of the 1990s, he adopted a stripped-down version of "Love and Mercy" as his signature closing number at live concerts.

== Critical reception ==
When discussing the 2004 Madrid train bombings in the book Bono: In Conversation with Michka Assayas, Bono states: "'Love and Mercy' is one of the great songs ever written ... I can't think of a greater song to be sung than Brian Wilson singing 'Love and Mercy'. Because, in a way, they're the two feelings that those terrorists sought to destroy."

== Cover versions ==
- 1988 – The Dumb Angels, Love and Mercy 7-inch single released by Fierce Recordings
- 1991 – Randy Stonehill, Making God Smile: An Artists' Tribute to the Songs of Beach Boy Brian Wilson
- 1998 – Golden Smog, "Until You Came Along" B-side
- 2003 – DM3, Garage Sale Vol. 2 - Italian Style!
- 2007 – Chris DeMay, I Won't Be Me
- 2008 – Libera, New Dawn
- 2008 – Wilco, Outta Print Volume One
- 2010 – Geoff Useless, Don't Stop
- 2015 – Gazelle Twin, The Walking Dead
- 2018 - The Miraculous Love Kids/Girl With a Guitar (featuring Brian Wilson)
- 2021 – The Gold Needles, Jem Records Celebrates Brian Wilson

== In popular culture ==
- The song was used for a final scene in the film Orange County (2002), where the main character realizes the importance of his hometown and the impact it will have on his future.
- The song was played over the end of the Broadway show Other Desert Cities (2011), referring to a book in the show with the same title as a song written by one of the characters.
- Love and Mercy (2014) is a biopic film based on Wilson's life.
- Gazelle Twin's cover of the song appears in The Walking Dead season 5 episode, "Conquer" (2015).

== Charts ==
Chart (1988)	Peak position
Italy Airplay (Music & Media)	5
