= I Just Wasn't Made for These Times (disambiguation) =

"I Just Wasn't Made for These Times" is a song written by Brian Wilson and Tony Asher for the Beach Boys in 1966.

I Just Wasn't Made for These Times may also refer to:

- I Just Wasn't Made for These Times (album), an album by Brian Wilson
- "I Just Wasn't Made for These Times" (Defiance), an episode of Defiance
- Brian Wilson: I Just Wasn't Made for These Times, a film by Don Was about Brian Wilson
