= Sweet Insanity =

Unofficial album by Brian Wilson

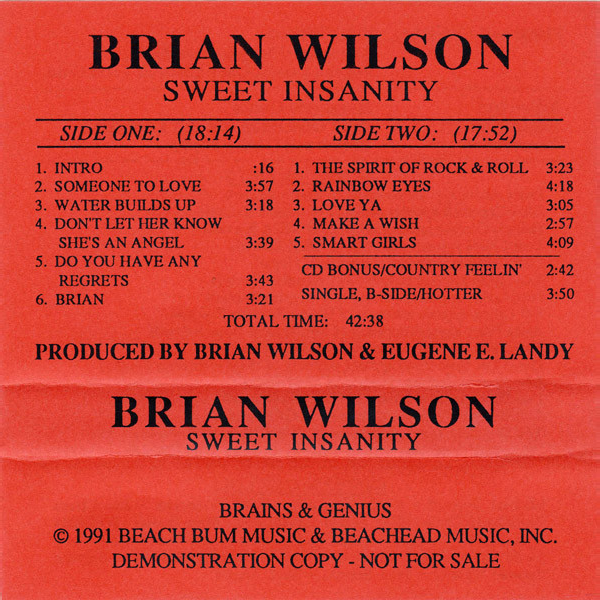
- J-card of Brains & Genius promotional cassette

Studio album (bootleg) by Brian Wilson
- Recorded: 1986–1990
- Length: 36:06
- Producers: Brian Wilson; Eugene Landy

Sweet Insanity is an unofficial album by the American musician Brian Wilson that was produced in 1990 as the follow-up to his first solo album, Brian Wilson (1988). It was largely written and produced by Wilson alongside his former psychologist, Eugene Landy.

The album was rejected by Sire Records, due in part to Landy's lyrics and the inclusion of "Smart Girls", a rap song. Select tracks were later rerecorded for Wilson's 2004 album Gettin' In over My Head.

== Background ==
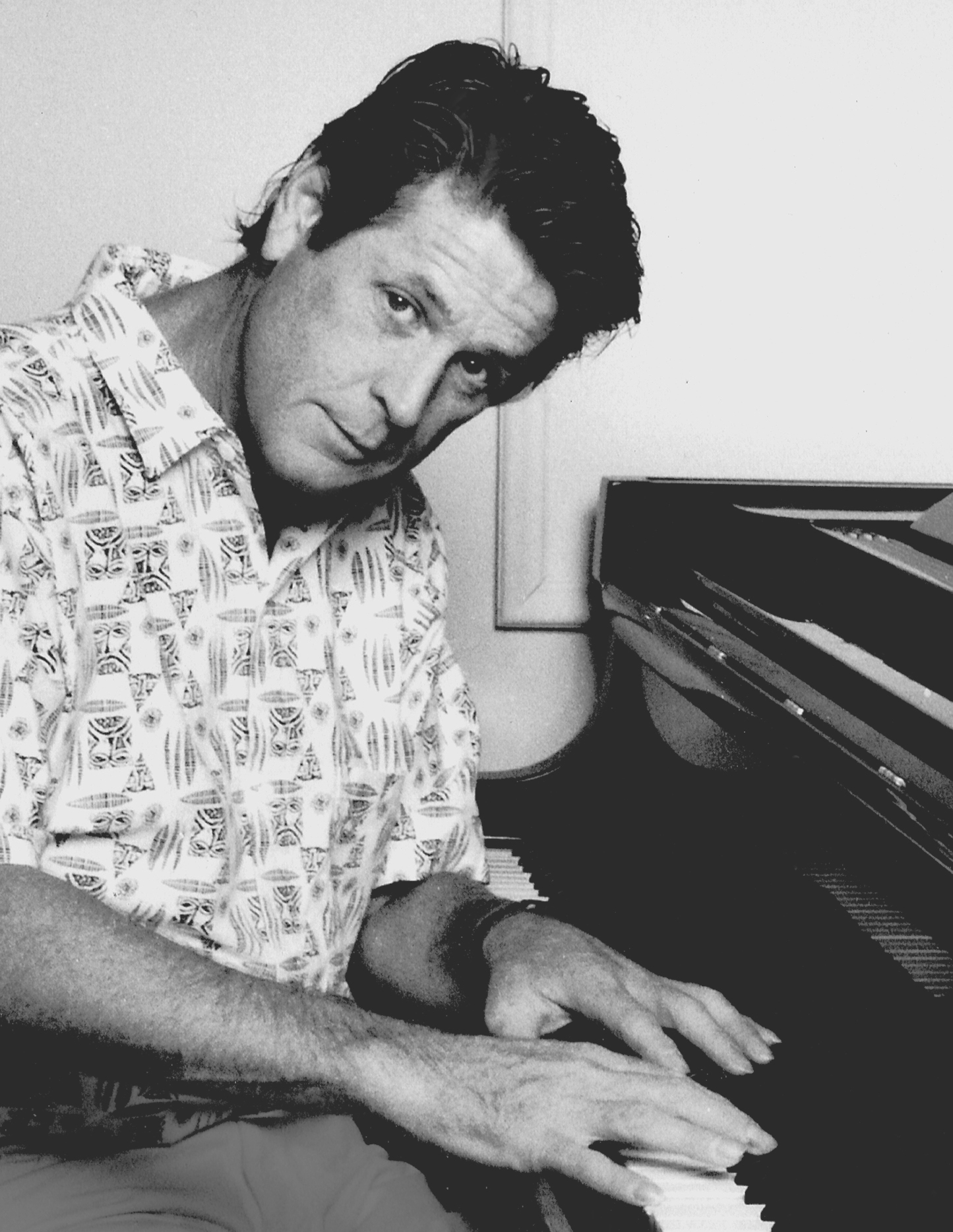
Wilson in the studio, 1990

In 1987, Wilson agreed to a two-album solo contract offered by Sire Records president Seymour Stein. The first album, Brian Wilson, was released in July 1988 to critical acclaim but underwhelming sales, and it was largely overshadowed by the controversies surrounding Wilson's former psychologist, Eugene Landy, who had become his business and creative partner. In August, Rolling Stone reported that Wilson was readying a second album, and that "half" of it had already been written. In May 1989, Wilson recorded "Daddy's Little Girl" for the film She's Out of Control, and in June, was among the featured guests on the charity single "The Spirit of the Forest". That summer, he began producing what became Sweet Insanity.

== Style and production ==
The production of Sweet Insanity retained most of the same personnel as that for Brian Wilson. This time, Landy co-produced the album alongside Wilson, and according to biographer Peter Ames Carlin, there was "no interference of the Sire hotshots who had shepherded Brian's first solo album." Andy Paley, who had co-produced Brian Wilson, said that the second solo effort "was even less real Brian than the first one". He recalled that working on Sweet Insanity was "such an unpleasant experience", although "there were good songs", such as "Rainbow Eyes". Critic Matthew Horton characterized the album's production style as "more bombastic and opulent than the subtler shades of Brian Wilson."

"Smart Girls"
"Smart Girls" a hip hop song in which Wilson raps over Beach Boys samples.

Like Brian Wilson, the record included some guest appearances. The Traveling Wilburys' Bob Dylan and Tom Petty, whose bandmate Jeff Lynne had co-produced a track on Brian Wilson, were featured on "The Spirit of Rock and Roll". Matt Dike, known for his recent hits with hip-hop acts Tone-Loc and Young MC, was asked to co-produce "Smart Girls", a rap song. Dike, who had been a major fan of the Beach Boys' late 1960s era, recalled that Wilson had expected the song to make "millions", to which Dike thought to himself, "What are you, fucking nuts?!"

Brian was the album's initial working title. The renaming to Sweet Insanity was meant to be a tongue-in-cheek reference to Wilson's much-publicized personal issues. In Wilson's 2016 memoir, I Am Brian Wilson, it explains that "the title was supposed to be a comment about the way that mental illness could turn into something beautiful, but I wasn't sure I wanted a title like that." In a 1993 interview, Mike Love remarked, "to call a record Sweet Insanity, imagine that. A whole album of Brian’s madness that no one wants to release and still everyone says he's a genius!"

== Rejection and availability ==
I thought some of the stuff was pretty good. It wasn't the best album I ever wrote. We just didn’t think it was good enough. They were just like demos. [...] we thought that maybe people wouldn’t like it, so we junked it.

— Brian Wilson, 2015

Two iterations of Sweet Insanity were presented to Sire Records, in 1990 and 1991, and both mixes were rejected due to the inclusion of "Smart Girls" and Landy's lyrics. According to Sire executive Howard Klein, "If [Sweet Insanity] was pathetic, Eugene Landy's lyrics were full of psychological mumbo jumbo. When Wilson brought the tapes in, I thought it was a joke, but it wasn't. It was awful." Sire then agreed to release Wilson from his contract.

Among the original Sweet Insanity tracks, "Country Feeling" was included on the 1991 charity album For Our Children. A limited-release cassette single of "Smart Girls" was also produced. (Note: Wilson and Landy, acting under the guise of their corporate banner Brains & Genius, produced a cassette single of "Smart Girls" to promote Wilson's 1991 memoir, Wouldn't It Be Nice: My Own Story. An insert that was included in the cassette stated that 250 copies were created and sent as gifts during the previous Christmas.) The rest of the album has since been bootlegged, with CD copies of the album distributed by the bootleg labels Vigotone and Invasion Unltd [sic] in 1993.

In 2004, re-recorded and slightly rewritten versions of "Rainbow Eyes", "Make a Wish", and "Don't Let Her Know She's an Angel" were included on Wilson's album Gettin' In over My Head. The album also included re-recordings of "Save the Day" (retitled "Fairy Tale") and "Let's Stick Together" (retitled "The Waltz"), which were not on Sweet Insanity, but dated from the same era. In 2006, a re-recording of "The Spirit of Rock and Roll" was included on a limited-release CD compilation, Songs from Here & Back.

== Critical reception ==
Professional ratings
Review scores
| Source | Rating |
|---|---|
| AllMusic | 2/5 stars |

Sweet Insanity was critically panned by many listeners who heard the record when it first circulated. An exception was music journalist Bill Holdship, who, in 1991, praised Sweet Insanity as "a wonderful album" and an improvement upon Brian Wilson. Holdship later reported that some fans were angered by the favorable review and had sent him several death threats in response.

In his 2007 book The Greatest Music Never Sold, author Dan Leroy wrote that several of the Sweet Insanity songs suggest that "Wilson's muse was still very much intact and functioning", although "it's fair to say that there is no composition in the Beach Boys' or Brian Wilson's history that has inspired so much enmity as 'Smart Girls.'" In the 2014 book The Greatest Albums You'll Never Hear, contributor Matthew Horton praised Sweet Insanity for having "plentiful merits", despite some "missteps".

Brett Milano of the Boston Phoenix regarded Sweet Insanity as among Wilson's "best post-'60s albums...For the first time since ''Til I Die', he's writing directly about his breakdown and recovery...Landy may have written these lyrics, but it hardly matters; Wilson didn't write the lyrics to Pet Sounds either."

AllMusic reviewer Matthew Greenwald wrote, "Most of the record is overbaked both lyrically and musically, with a feeling of sitting in on a therapy session rather than a recording. Some of it is unlistenable, and the mark of Brian Wilson only surfaces rarely. For diehard collectors and the brave of heart."

== Track listing ==
Per Andrew Doe.

All tracks are written by Brian Wilson, Eugene Landy, and Alexandra Morgan unless noted. Landy and Morgan are no longer credited in publishing databases.

Side one
| No. | Title | Notes | Length |
|---|---|---|---|
| 1. | "Intro" | | 0:16 |
| 2. | "Someone to Love" | | 3:57 |
| 3. | "Water Builds Up" | | 3:18 |
| 4. | "Don't Let Her Know She's an Angel" | | 3:39 |
| 5. | "Do You Have Any Regrets?" | | 3:43 |
| 6. | "Brian" | also known as "Thank You" | 3:21 |
| Total length: | | | 18:14 |

Side two
| No. | Title | Featuring | Length |
|---|---|---|---|
| 1. | "The Spirit of Rock & Roll" (Wilson, Landy, Gary Usher, Tom Kelly) | Bob Dylan and Tom Petty | 3:23 |
| 2. | "Rainbow Eyes" | | 4:18 |
| 3. | "Love Ya" (Wilson, Landy, Morgan, Todd Gold) | | 3:05 |
| 4. | "Make a Wish" | | 2:57 |
| 5. | "Smart Girls" | | 4:09 |
| Total length: | | | 17:52 36:06 |

Extra tracks
| No. | Title | Notes | Length |
|---|---|---|---|
| 12. | "Country Feelin'" | CD bonus | 2:42 |
| 13. | "Hotter" (Wilson, Landy, Morgan, Andy Paley) | Single, B-side | 3:50 |
| Total length: | | | 42:38 |

== Personnel ==
Partial credits.

- Brian Wilson - vocals, producer
- Eugene Landy - producer
- Tom Petty - vocals on "The Spirit of Rock and Roll"
- Bob Dylan - vocals on "The Spirit of Rock and Roll"
- Andy Paley
- Paula Abdul
- "Weird Al" Yankovic
- Matt Dike - co-producer ("Smart Girls")

== See also ==
- The Beach Boys bootleg recordings
- Adult/Child

== Bibliography ==
- Abbott, Kingsley, ed. (1997). Back to the Beach: A Brian Wilson and the Beach Boys Reader (1st ed.). London: Helter Skelter. ISBN 978-1900924023.
- Badman, Keith (2004). The Beach Boys: The Definitive Diary of America's Greatest Band, on Stage and in the Studio. Backbeat Books. ISBN 978-0-87930-818-6.
- Carlin, Peter Ames (2006). Catch a Wave: The Rise, Fall, and Redemption of the Beach Boys' Brian Wilson. Rodale. ISBN 978-1-59486-320-2.
- Dillon, Mark (2012). Fifty Sides of the Beach Boys: The Songs That Tell Their Story. ECW Press. ISBN 978-1-77090-198-8.
- Holdship, Bill (1997) [1991]. "Bittersweet Insanity: The Fight for Brian Wilson's Soul". In Abbott, Kingsley (ed.). Back to the Beach: A Brian Wilson and the Beach Boys Reader (1st ed.). London: Helter Skelter. pp. 205–212. ISBN 978-1900924023.
- Horton, Matthew (2014). "Sweet Insanity". In MacDonald, Bruno (ed.). The Greatest Albums You'll Never Hear: Unreleased Records by the World's Greatest Artists. London. ISBN 978-1844037773.
- Lambert, Philip (2007). Inside the Music of Brian Wilson: the Songs, Sounds, and Influences of the Beach Boys' Founding Genius. Continuum. ISBN 978-0-8264-1876-0.
- LeRoy, Dan (2007). The Greatest Music Never Sold: Secrets of Legendary Lost Albums by David Bowie, Seal, Beastie Boys, Chicago, Mick Jagger and More!. New York: Backbeat Books. ISBN 978-0879309053.
- White, Timothy (1996). The Nearest Faraway Place: Brian Wilson, the Beach Boys, and the Southern Californian Experience. Macmillan. ISBN 0333649370.
- Wilson, Brian; Greenman, Ben (2016). I Am Brian Wilson: A Memoir. Da Capo Press. ISBN 978-0-306-82307-7.
