= Let's Go to Heaven in My Car =

Single by Brian Wilson
- B-side: "Too Much Sugar"
- Released: March 1987
- Recorded: 1986
- Length: 3:38
- Label: Sire
- Songwriters: Brian Wilson, Gary Usher
- Producers: Brian Wilson, Gary Usher

Brian Wilson singles chronology
"Gettin' Hungry" (1967)	"Let's Go to Heaven in My Car" (1987)	"Love and Mercy" (1988)

"Let's Go to Heaven in My Car" is a song by American musician Brian Wilson from the 1987 film Police Academy 4: Citizens on Patrol. It was written by Wilson and Gary Usher.

== Background ==
"Let's Go to Heaven in My Car" was written by Brian Wilson and Gary Usher. It is a reworked version of one of Wilson's unreleased songs, "Water Builds Up", which shares similar verses. Wilson later said that he preferred "Water Builds Up", remarking that "Let's Go to Heaven in My Car" was only good for its title.

== Recording ==
Sire Records producer Andy Paley, who had been recruited as the co-producer of Wilson's first solo album, played on "Let's Go to Heaven in My Car" and another song from around the same period. He remembered of the recording,

I played piano and drums and sang on both [songs]. Brian did tons of vocals and stuff on synthesizers. And Dick Dale was there to. Gary Usher was producing. Brian and Gary were definitely checking me out. Trying to see what I was capable of. Very soon after that, work began on the Sire album.

== Release ==
Released as a single in March 1987, "Let's Go to Heaven in My Car" (backed with "Too Much Sugar") was Wilson's first solo record since 1966. An alternate mix of the song appeared on the Police Academy 4 soundtrack album.

In 2000, the song was included as a bonus track on a reissue of Wilson's first solo album, Brian Wilson (1988).

== Critical reception ==
"Let's Go to Heaven in My Car" was nominated for the Golden Raspberry Award for Worst Original Song for its inclusion in Police Academy 4. Biographer David Leaf wrote, "To this fan, both the 1986 Usher-era demo of 'Let’s Go To Heaven' and the 1990 unreleased recording of 'Water Builds Up' are superior to this single, a result that is unfortunately very typical of much of Brian Wilson’s recording career of the past quarter century."
