= Rio Grande (song) =

1988 song by Brian Wilson

Song by Brian Wilson

from the album Brian Wilson
- Released: July 12, 1988
- Recorded: 1987–1988
- Genre: Progressive pop
- Length: 8:12
- Label: Sire/Reprise
- Songwriters: Brian Wilson, Andy Paley
- Producers: Brian Wilson, Andy Paley, Lenny Waronker

Audio sample
- file; help

"Rio Grande" is a song by American musician Brian Wilson from his 1988 album Brian Wilson. It was written and produced by Wilson and Andy Paley, and co-produced by Lenny Waronker. Its modular set of movements hearkened back to the style that Brian Wilson used during the "Good Vibrations"/Smile era with musique concrète. According to critics such as David Leaf, "Rio Grande" was evidence that Wilson could still create elaborate, pictorial landscapes of music similar to Smile whenever he had the freedom to do so. It is the longest piece of music in the Brian Wilson solo catalogue at eight minutes and 12 seconds.

== Background ==
Waronker and Seymour Stein, the President of Sire Records, encouraged Wilson to make an impressionistic collage that had made Smile an interesting listening experience. Eugene Landy suggested to Brian to make a suite about the development of an individual. However, it was Lenny Waronker who insinuated to Brian to undertake a more complex, revealing, and provisional composition with an Old West theme inspired by the Howard Hawks film Red River and also the movie Rio Grande. A Hawaiian theme was also being considered at the time but was dropped in favor of a Western theme. According to Wilson, "He wanted me to get a little bit into that kind of Smile bag, and I did. Some of it took on characteristics of the Smile album, but that’s all, just characteristics. It wasn’t directly influenced by Smile, just the vibes of it, the basic feeling of it." Waronker wanted to produce with Wilson since 1969, and stated "If I ever get the opportunity to produce Brian, I'd encourage him to do something that combined the vividness of 'Good Vibrations' with the non-commercial gentleness of 'Cool, Cool Water'," a track from the Beach Boys album Sunflower.

Work on "Rio Grande" began on October 1, 1987, which happened at the same time as a major Los Angeles earthquake that resulted in eight deaths and $350 million in property damage. Paley remarked, "Both Brian and the tremors took some adjusting to." A similar concept being worked on during the same period involved "Saturday Morning in the City" and "Saturday Evening in the City" about describing an ordinary Californian suburban weekend but was soon dropped. Early titles before "Rio Grande" was chosen included 'Baby, Child, Adult,' 'Child, Adult, and Parent,' and "Life's Suite." The lyrics of "Life's Suite" (pun intended), written by Landy, were brought in at the last moment and were rejected out of hand by Waronker.

== Content and lyrics ==
"Rio Grande" presents a series of episodic music segments meant to illustrate a trip across an American frontier. According to Paley, "Brian was really into writing this as a survival thing, the idea of a little man against the big men and making it on your own … the misunderstandings that must have happened between travelers on the same trail and how scary that must have been."

Wilson's favorite part of the song was the "Take Me Home" section. He explained that the narrator of the song "has so many obstacles that he just wants to go home. He wants to run away from all that stuff and go back to his home, wherever that might be, [like] in the sky. That’s symbolism, right? God cannot be conceived of, so therefore we give him a literal meaning that he’s in the sky, so that people can understand what is being said."

== Reception ==
Landy acknowledged, "'Rio Grande' is 20% of the album, and it isn't something you can dance to. Lenny should be congratulated for pushing Brian in that direction."

In her review of Brian Wilson, critic Deborah Wilker highlighted "Rio Grande" as "the kind of immensely fulfilling progressive pop with which art-rock bands such as Yes and Genesis formerly toyed, but rarely brought to satisfying completion."
