= Good Vibrations: My Life as a Beach Boy =

2016 memoir by Mike Love

- Author: Mike Love with James S. Hirsch
- Language: English
- Genre: Autobiography, memoir
- Published: Blue Rider Press
- Publication date: September 13, 2016
- Publication place: United States
- Pages: 436

Good Vibrations: My Life as a Beach Boy is an autobiographical memoir by American musician Mike Love, co-founder of the Beach Boys, written with James S. Hirsch. The book was published by Blue Rider Press on September 13, 2016, one month before the release of fellow co-founder Brian Wilson's autobiography, I Am Brian Wilson: A Memoir. Love wrote the book as a response to "many inaccuracies" that had been said about him over the decades. Much of it covers his 1992 lawsuit against Wilson for owed songwriting credits.

== Background ==
In November 2014, Love announced that he had been working on the book and that it would be due in 2016. After the work was completed, he said that the "easiest part of writing this book was just commenting on my actual experiences as a Beach Boy, because there have been many inaccuracies that have been said about me over the years." He says that co-writer James H. Hirsch helped by "read[ing] every book and article that's ever been written about the Beach Boys. It really gave context to telling about all the things that happened in my career."

== Critical response ==
The Los Angeles Times' Sarah Rodman wrote: "To the people who believe that Brian rules and Mike drools, what Love writes will not matter one iota. But for those interested in Love's perspective, My Life as a Beach Boy is a generally solid read." Comparing it to I Am Brian Wilson, journalist James Wolcott wrote that Good Vibrations "is the better read: lively, informative, thumbtacked with crazy specifics, and a decent job of self-exoneration." The Australian's David Free rued that Love's "hyper-confidence makes his book an unusually honest one. Because he thinks he's always right, he leaves nothing out. Indeed his memoir has a panoramic clarity that Wilson's lacks: if you don't know much about the Beach Boys, Love's is the better book to start with."

The New York Times' Janet Maslin accused Love of cherrypicking facts: "Still, its boasts and grudges overpower the writing style. And more than a half-century's worth of inside information about the Beach Boys, who were all the rage until they were ancient history, has undeniable appeal, especially from a new perspective." Journalist David Hepworth said that Love and Wilson's respective books "take themselves preposterously seriously", that neither author "seem[s] to realise just how absurd his life has been", and that Love's book is "so relentless in its efforts to build up his part that you feel that Will Ferrell should consider turning it into a film".

Pitchfork's Stacey Anderson opined that public characterizations of Love are often "overly reductive. Love contributed much to the Beach Boys' success—but he only damages himself by detailing his perceived misfortunes while refusing to explore any real sympathy toward his bandmate of actual disability." She adds that Love's seeming lack of empathy for Wilson is "summarized neatly in the acknowledgements section, where Love thanks neither Wilson nor the original Beach Boys but does praise John Stamos."
