= Smart Girls =

Song by Brian Wilson

from the album Sweet Insanity
- Released: 1991
- Recorded: August 23, 1990
- Studio: Studio Ultimo
- Genre: Surf rap
- Length: 4:09
- Songwriter: Brian Wilson
- Producers: Brian Wilson; Eugene Landy; Matt Dike

Audio sample
- file; help

"Smart Girls" is a song by the American musician Brian Wilson from his unofficial 1990 album Sweet Insanity. It was produced by Wilson, his former psychologist Eugene Landy, and Matt Dike. The publishing credits Wilson as the sole writer, while an original acetate credits Wilson, Landy, and Landy's girlfriend Alexandra Morgan for writing.

== Content ==
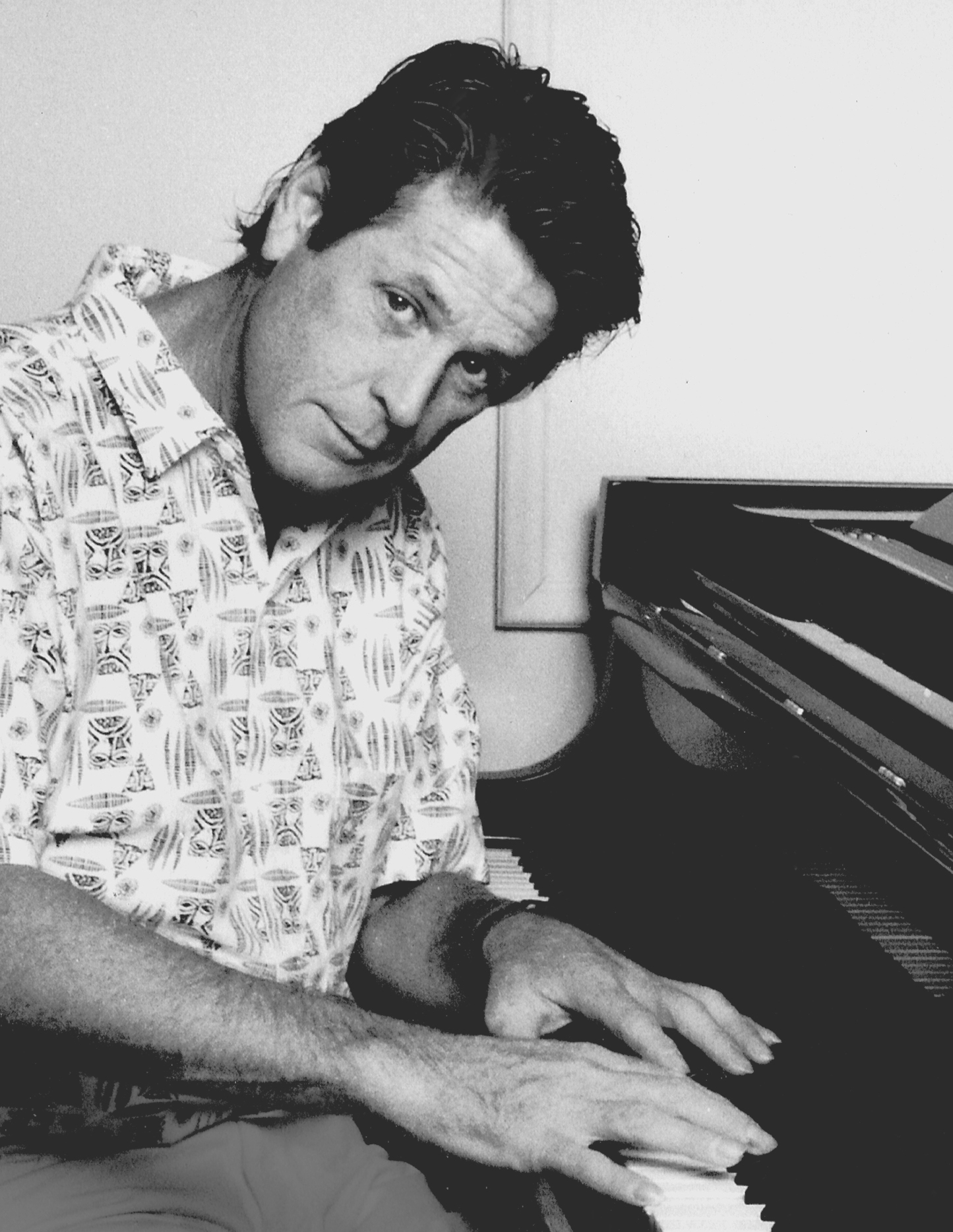
Wilson in 1990.

"Smart Girls" is a hip-hop pastiche containing numerous Beach Boys samples, self-quotations, and autobiographical allusions. The lyrics detail Wilson's infatuation with intelligent women, as he acknowledges that his old Beach Boys songs showed only a superficial appreciation of women.

The song was recorded reportedly at Landy's insistence. Asked in 2015 about "Smart Girls", Wilson said, "Yeah, we were just having a good time. Yeah, it was fun. We were just kidding."

== Release ==
Wilson and Landy, as their business partnership "Brains & Genius", produced a cassette single of "Smart Girls" to promote Wilson's 1991 memoir, Wouldn't It Be Nice: My Own Story (written by numerous ghostwriters under Landy's heavy influence, and which Wilson later disowned). An insert included in the cassette stated that 250 copies were created and sent as gifts during the previous Christmas.

== Critical reception ==
Author/musician Jason Hartley wrote: "What is important was that Wilson was embracing rap when many older rockers thought that rap wasn't real music. As ridiculous as 'Smart Girls' may seem to you today, at the very least, Brian Wilson was on the right side of history."

== See also ==
- "All Dressed Up for School"
- "Hey Little Tomboy"
- "Wipe Out" (The Fat Boys and the Beach Boys version)
