= James S. Hirsch =

American journalist and author

James S. Hirsch is an American journalist and author who has written about sports, race, and American culture. He was a reporter for The New York Times and The Wall Street Journal, and his first book was the best-selling Hurricane: The Miraculous Journey of Rubin Carter.

Hirsch has also written Riot and Remembrance: The Tulsa Race War and Its Legacy, Two Souls Indivisible: The Friendship That Saved Two POWs in Vietnam, and Cheating Destiny: Living with Diabetes. His biography of Willie Mays, released in February 2010, describes how the Negro leagues phenom became an instant sensation with the New York Giants in the 1950s, was the headliner in Major League Baseball's expansion to California, and played an important but underappreciated role in the civil rights movement.

Hirsch, a graduate of the Missouri School of Journalism and the Lyndon B. Johnson School of Public Affairs, lives in the Boston area.

== Bibliography ==
- Hurricane: The Miraculous Journey of Rubin Carter Mariner Books. ISBN 0-618-08728-1
- Riot and Remembrance: The Tulsa Race War and Its Legacy Mariner Books. ISBN 0-618-10813-0
- Two Souls Indivisible: The Friendship That Saved Two POWs in Vietnam Houghton Mifflin. ISBN 0-618-10813-0
- Cheating Destiny: Living with Diabetes, America's Biggest Epidemic Houghton Mifflin. ISBN 0-618-51461-9
- Willie Mays: The Life, The Legend New York: Scribner. ISBN 978-1-4165-4790-7
- Good Vibrations: My Life as a Beach Boy (with Mike Love) ISBN 978-0399176418
