= I Just Wasn't Made for These Times (album) =

Studio album and soundtrack album by Brian Wilson
- Released: August 15, 1995
- Recorded: 1976 ("Still I Dream of It"); 1994 – c. August 1995
- Studio: Ocean Way (Hollywood, CA); The Chomsky Ranch (Los Angeles, CA); Record One (Los Angeles); The Mastering Lab (Hollywood)
- Length: 29:27
- Label: MCA
- Producer: Don Was; Brian Wilson

Brian Wilson chronology
Brian Wilson (1988)	I Just Wasn't Made for These Times (1995)	Orange Crate Art (1995)

Singles from I Just Wasn't Made for These Times
- 1. "Do It Again" / "'Til I Die" Released: 1995

Professional ratings
Review scores
Source	Rating
AllMusic	3.5/5 stars
Christgau's Consumer Guide	(neither)
MusicHound Rock	4/5 stars
The Rolling Stone Album Guide	3.5/5 stars

I Just Wasn't Made for These Times is the second solo album by American musician Brian Wilson and the soundtrack to Don Was' documentary of the same name, released by MCA Records on August 15, 1995. It consists almost entirely of rerecordings of Wilson's past songs. The title is taken from the song of the same name which Wilson wrote in 1966 with collaborator Tony Asher for the Beach Boys' album Pet Sounds.

Wilson commented of the rerecordings in a 1995 interview: “At first, I thought ‘This is gonna be contrived, the songs were all old hat. But then I understood the context of it all, so I felt free to talk without worrying about what I was saying. I got a sense of my self — a sense of worth.

== Track listing ==
All tracks written by Brian Wilson, with additional writers noted.

No.	Title	Writer(s)	Length
1.	"Meant for You" (originally from Friends)	Mike Love	0:50
2.	"This Whole World" (originally from Sunflower)		1:55
3.	"Caroline, No" (originally from Pet Sounds)	Tony Asher	2:39
4.	"Let the Wind Blow" (originally from Wild Honey)	Love	2:44
5.	"Love and Mercy" (originally from Brian Wilson)		3:13
6.	"Do It Again" (featuring Carnie and Wendy Wilson) (originally from 20/20)	Love	2:44
7.	"The Warmth of the Sun" (originally from Shut Down Volume 2)	Love	3:48
8.	"Wonderful" (originally from Smiley Smile)	Van Dyke Parks	2:14
9.	"Still I Dream of It" (1976 home demo)		3:35
10.	"Melt Away" (originally from Brian Wilson)		2:58
11.	"'Til I Die" (originally from Surf’s Up)		2:47
Total length:			29:27

Notes

- Van Dyke Parks was originally uncredited as a writer on "Wonderful"
- Eugene Landy originally received writing credits on "Love and Mercy" and "Melt Away"

== Personnel ==
From liner notes.

- Brian Wilson – vocals, piano
- Carnie Wilson – background vocals on "Do It Again"
- Wendy Wilson – background vocals on "Do It Again"
- Jim Keltner – drums
- James "Hutch" Hutchinson – bass
- Benmont Tench – piano, organ
- Mark Goldenberg – guitar
- Waddy Wachtel – guitar
- Dave McMurray – saxophone, flute
- Sweet Pea Atkinson – background vocals
- Sir Harry Bowens – background vocals
- Donald Ray Mitchell – background vocals
- Jeff Pescetto – background vocals, background vocal conductor
- Andrew Gold – background vocals, background vocal conductor
- Kip Lennon – background vocals

Production and technical staff

- Don Was – producer (except "Still I Dream of It")
- Brian Wilson – producer
- Rik Pekkonen – engineer/recording, mixing
- Dan Bosworth – engineer/recording, assistant engineer
- Rail Rogut – mix assistant
- Doug Sax – mastering
- Gavin Lursson – mastering assistant
- Jane Oppenheimer – "chief of staff"
- Carrie McConkey ("for The Marsha Burn Co.") – production coordinator
- Vartan – art direction
- Don Engel – design
- Forest Fein – design
- Caroline Grayshock – photography

Recording studios

- Recorded at Ocean Way, Hollywood, CA
- Additional recording done at The Chomsky Ranch, Los Angeles, CA
- Mixed at Record One, Los Angeles, CA
- Mastered at The Mastering Lab, Hollywood, CA

== See also ==
- Andy Paley sessions
