= Cows in the Pasture =

Unreleased studio album by Fred Vail

Studio album by Fred Vail and Brian Wilson
- Recorded: April 1970, 2024
- Studio: Wally Heider Recording, Hollywood
- Genre: Country and western
- Producer: Brian Wilson (original production; also executive producer, 2024 overdubs); Sam Parker (additional production, 2024 overdubs)

Cows in the Pasture is an upcoming country and western album recorded in 1970 by former Beach Boys talent manager and promoter Fred Vail and produced by Brian Wilson. The album is now in the works to be completed, along with a documentary which will trace Vail's life story and the resurrection of the country record.

== Background ==
In the early months of 1970, Brian Wilson held a meeting with Fred Vail, at the time the manager of Wilson's band the Beach Boys, in a Los Angeles hotel room. Wilson proposed the idea of recording a country music album, with Vail on lead vocals and Wilson overseeing production. The proposal, even by Wilson's standards at the time, was perceived as unconventional, primarily due to Vail's lack of formal singing experience.

Five recording sessions unfolded at Wally Heider Studios in Hollywood, California, between April 4 to April 17, 1970. These sessions coincided with the Beach Boys' recording of Sunflower nearby in Hollywood. Throughout these recording sessions, Wilson and Vail collaborated to lay down the foundational tracks, complete with scratch vocals, for a total of 13 songs. Musicians such as James Burton on guitar, Glen D. Hardin on piano, and Red Rhodes on steel guitar contributed to the project.

Halfway through the recording process, before Vail could finalize the vocals, the project was abandoned for unknown reasons. The master tapes were subsequently shelved for over five decades. This unfinished album eventually gained significance in Beach Boys lore, with fans colloquially naming the previously untitled project Cows in the Pasture.

== Completion ==
Circa 2014, the Beach Boys' management contacted Fred Vail to inform him that they had discovered five rolls of two-inch tape with his and Brian Wilson's names on them. Vail requested that they be sent to him rather than being disposed of. Around the same time, Vail befriended concert producer Sam Parker, a Beach Boys fan who was eager to hear Vail's stories about his time with the band. After learning that Vail had the Cows in the Pasture tapes in his garage, Parker decided to finish the album and tell Vail's story in the form of a documentary.

The plan was to finish the tracks with new vocals by Vail and an assortment of guest singers, including Wilson. A camera crew has been present at the new studio sessions, with the footage to be turned into a documentary on Vail that will also be produced by Parker and executive produced by Wilson. Some of the recordings are planned to be released by 2026, with the full album and documentary to come later.

== Fred Vail ==
Frederick Vail (born March 24, 1944) has held various roles including concert promoter and co-manager for the Beach Boys. Vail began his career in Sacramento, California, commencing as a radio announcer and teenage news announcer at the age of 12. During his high school years, he spearheaded the committee responsible for orchestrating the arrival of various bands at school dances.

Among these musical talents was the Beach Boys, who, at the time, were gaining traction on the charts but limited their performances mainly to the Los Angeles area. Vail successfully secured the band for an event, marking the beginning of a prosperous collaboration. His involvement in promoting and booking the Beach Boys continued to play a crucial role over the ensuing years.

His roles at Capitol Records and RCA Records as a promotion and marketing manager gave him the opportunity to move to Nashville in 1974. In 1980, Vail founded Treasure Isle Recorders, Inc., the first Nashville studio to become all-digital, remaining busy over the years due to the spacious tracking rooms, which many engineers and musicians claim to be among the best acoustics they gave encountered. Artists such as Dolly Parton, Johnny Cash, the Beach Boys, and Waylon Jennings have recorded in the studio.

Vail's friendship with the Beach Boys spanned over 60 years. He came up with the concept of the Beach Boys Concert album and arranged the group's 1983 White House concert. Vail's journey with the band also included moments such as witnessing the mastering of Pet Sounds in the studio.

Reflecting on his interactions with the band, Vail shared, "A lot of times when I'd pick the Beach Boys up I'd have country stations on, and I'd sing along sometimes and they'd be teasing me. And then they'd put on the pop music stations and I'd put it back on the country stations. We were just fooling around. So they knew I sang and liked country music."

== Track listing ==
Per Badman:

1. "Bethany Ann"
2. "(There's) Always Something There to Remind Me"
3. "Kittens Kids & Kites"
4. "Lucky Billy"
5. "One Woman Won't Hold Me"
6. "If You're Not Lovin'"
7. "Cows in the Pasture" Instrumental
8. "All for the Love of the Girl"
9. "Only the Lonely"
10. "Carolina in My Mind"
11. "My Way of Life"
12. "(Now and Then There's) A Fool Such as I"
13. "You Pass Me By/I Can't Help It If I'm Still in Love with You"

== Personnel ==
Original 1970 sessions

Per Badman:

- Brian Wilson – production
- Fred Vail – vocals
- James Burton – guitar
- Buddy Emmons – steel guitar
- Glen D. Hardin – piano
- Red Rhodes – steel guitar
- Keith Allison – bass guitar (Fender Precision Bass)
- Gordon Terry – fiddle
- Jay Dee Maness – steel guitar
- Dennis St. John – drums
- Freddy Weller – acoustic guitar
- Gib Guilbeau – electric and bottleneck guitar
- Red Wooten – double bass

2024 overdubs

Partial credits from the official Cows in the Pasture website.

- Fred Vail – vocals
- Brian Wilson – vocals, executive producer
- Sam Parker – production

== See also ==
- The Beach Boys bootleg recordings
- Stars and Stripes Vol. 1, a Beach Boys covers album by country musicians
