= I Am Brian Wilson =

2016 autobiographical memoir

I Am Brian Wilson: A Memoir
- Author: Brian Wilson, Ben Greenman
- Language: English
- Genre: Autobiography, memoir
- Published: Da Capo Press
- Publication date: October 11, 2016
- Publication place: United States
- Pages: 320
- ISBN: 978-0306823060

I Am Brian Wilson: A Memoir is the second autobiographical memoir of American musician Brian Wilson, written by journalist Ben Greenman through several months of interviews with Wilson. It was intended to supplant Wouldn't It Be Nice: My Own Story, Wilson's disowned autobiography from 1991. I Am Brian Wilson was published by Da Capo Press on October 11, 2016, one month after the release of Mike Love's autobiography: Good Vibrations: My Life as a Beach Boy.

== Background ==
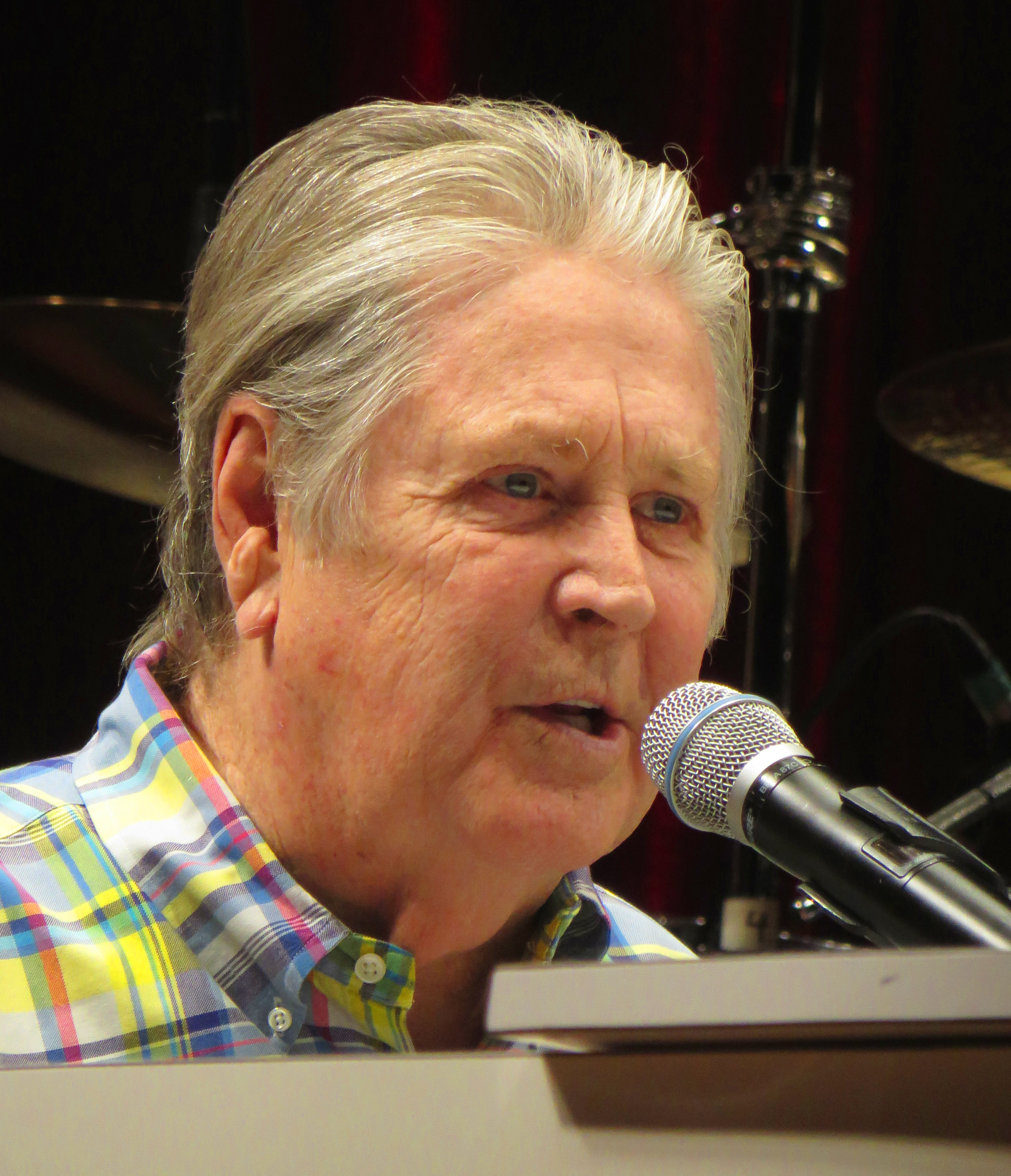
Wilson performing in 2015

The memoir was announced in April 2013, reported to be written with journalist Jason Fine, published by Coronet Books, and given a 2015 release date. While Wilson's website stated that he "will describe for the first time the epic highs and lows of his life", The Guardian noted that Wouldn't It Be Nice: My Own Story had covered many of the same topics mentioned by the site. However, the 1991 book is considered "controversial" in Wilson lore, and predates his solo resurgence of the 2000s.

In June 2015, Wilson reported: "One guy crapped out on me, so I’m doing it with somebody else. It has to be done." In February 2016, it was reported that the book was "years in the making and [has] already seen at least one co-author hired and fired". Wilson said that the book was about "three-quarters" finished and that it was being written with help from friend Ray Lawlor. He likened the writing process to therapy, saying: "There are a lot of memories that go along with my book. I have to take the good memories with the bad memories."

The book was ultimately completed with New York-based writer Ben Greenman. According to Wilson, the process involved many telephone interviews over the course of eight months, each lasting about 40 minutes. Greenman then put together the book. When asked how he dealt with his inability to recollect some events, Wilson responded: "Well, the book needed to be factual. We did the movie [2015's Love & Mercy] first, which was factual—but it had parts of it that weren't actually as factual—but doing it helped my memory. So that helped with writing the book, which is almost all factual. I hope people can relate to it because none of it's fiction, as wild as some of it seems. It's fact!"

== Legitimacy ==
Journalist David Hepworth also wrote that "one senses" it was "guided by Wilson's wife and manager, Melinda". Earlier in 2014, the project was met with skepticism by former collaborator Van Dyke Parks, who was approached for questioning by Fine's assistant via Twitter, responding, "Doesn't sound 'auto' to me!" When asked about negative comments Wilson made in the book, Love responded: "He's not in charge of his life, like I am mine. His every move is orchestrated and a lot of things he's purported to say, there's not tape of it. But, I don't like to put undue pressure on him, either, because I know he has a lot of issues. Out of compassion, I don't respond to everything that is purportedly said by him." As of November 2016, Love has not read Wilson's book.

== Critical response ==
Forbes' Brad Auerbach calls the book "a wonderful insight into a troubled genius ... his voice definitely comes through. ... Like many autobiographies, Wilson follows a generally linear approach, but he often skips around a straight chronological approach. This works well, as his mind connects sounds and visions across decades." The Wall Street Journal's David Kirby wrote that "Wilson’s poker-faced acceptance [is] a reminder to take life as it comes. Part of the charm of his account is the way he drops little moments into the story with no preamble and then moves on with no follow-through." The New York Times' Alan Light reviewed: "At its best, I Am Brian Wilson has an odd, unpredictable rhythm, ... it does offer some fascinating glimpses under the hood."

Comparing it to Love's book, Telegraph's Helen Brown characterizes I Am Brian Wilson as having "more sadness ... and more moments of magic." She surmised that it "must have been torture" for Greenman to "drag anything out of Wilson ... [who] admits to memory problems and to making things up to 'test' people. ... Whatever Greenman’s pain, the torture was probably greater for Wilson, who prefers to evade his traumatic past when questioned and speaks mostly in banalities – when he speaks at all."

Hepworth criticized the authors of both books for their lack of self-awareness, and Wilson's book specifically for having a tendency to "perfect[ly] recall ... every compliment he has ever been paid by a well-known musician."

== See also ==
- "Brian Wilson is a genius"
