= Wouldn't It Be Nice: My Own Story =

1991 book by Brian Wilson

- Author: Brian Wilson, Todd Gold
- Genre: Autobiography, memoir
- Published: October 21, 1991 (HarperCollins)
- Pages: 398
- ISBN: 978-0-06018-313-4

Wouldn't It Be Nice: My Own Story is the first memoir by American musician Brian Wilson, written with celebrity journalist Todd Gold and published by HarperCollins in 1991. The book was heavily criticized for the implausibility of Wilson being its actual author, and it inspired multiple defamation lawsuits from his family members and associates.

Wilson later disowned the book. In court proceedings, he testified that he had been interviewed and skimmed through a rough draft before it was published. Wilson's then-therapist and business partner Eugene Landy was also closely involved with the writing. Gold disputed reports of Landy's involvement, although he acknowledged that portions of the book were paraphrased from other literature. He maintained that Wilson granted his approval to the chapters as they were being written and provided his own corrections.

== Background and research ==
Gold told The Washington Post that he used notes prepared by writer Henry Edwards during interviews for a similar, unfinished book project in 1987. He provided further details of Wilson's involvement in a 1991 interview,

I had to learn not to always rely on him for every anecdote, but if I could do research and then bring a historical fact to him and ask him to embellish it he could do that. ... When he absolutely didn't remember [a detail] and it was important to have something about it in the book, things were paraphrased from other material. Or from other outside interviews ... In the end, Brian was given chapters as they were finished – three or four at a time and asked to approve them or correct them ... And he did. ... Landy was never ever around when I interviewed Brian and neither of them were ever around when I was at my computer working on the book.

Wilson stated under oath that he was interviewed for about "thirty to forty hours" and that he had skimmed through a draft of the book before it was published. His psychologist-turned-business partner Eugene Landy said that he was not involved with the writing, but court documents proved that Landy was a close partner in the writing and production process.

== Authenticity and plagiarism ==
The book's authorship and authenticity was "seriously challenged" by Wilson's past biographers. Responding to accusations of plagiarism, Gold asserted that "any celebrity book relies on extensive culling of magazine articles and past interviews and recycling", and that "everything was paraphrased to the best of our ability as told through Brian's eyes."

In several articles published by Billboard in 1991, writers including David Leaf, Timothy White and Neal McCabe accused the book of plagiarizing earlier texts on Wilson and the Beach Boys written by White, Jules Siegel, Paul Williams and Tom Nolan. According to biographer Peter Ames Carlin, "the stories being related had been lifted nearly word for word from earlier biographies, only with the pronouns changed to reflect Brian's first-person perspective. In other sections the narrative read like depositions for their various court cases, while others ripped the Beach Boys for various personal and professional shortcomings." Musicologist Philip Lambert wrote: "The book is plagued by factual misstatements, language and opinions that are implausibly Brian's, and text that defies credulity".

Lambert argued that, despite its flaws, Wouldn't It Be Nice should not be completely disregarded. He explained that while the book may have been corrupted by motivations in self-interest and legal maneuverings, it "may still provide some nuggets of truth about Brian's day-to-day existence while under Landy's care." Lambert concluded that the biography "can be useful ... if accessed through the proper filters. I don't accept the book's text at face value, but if it's consistent with other sources and rings true, I'm willing to consider it a qualified authority."

== Reviews ==
The New York Times noted that the book was suspiciously published as Wilson was in the midst of numerous lawsuits, but that his "co-author, Todd Gold, a writer at People magazine, helps give the story its brisk, anecdotal pace and pop-psychological facility." Journalist Nick Kent observed that "the most disturbing aspect of the text was the way Brian's story was suddenly hijacked in the middle and turned into an unsolicited testimonial to the miraculous healing powers and all-round good guy qualities of flat-out genius Eugene Landy." David Felton of Rolling Stone wrote "the autobiography reads like some slick parody of the end of Psycho, with the psychiatrist telling the police: 'Brian was never all Brian, but he was often only Landy. Now the Landy half has taken over. Probably for all time.'"

== Lawsuits ==
Mike Love did not read Wouldn't It Be Nice but filed a defamation suit against HarperCollins regarding his representation in the book. HarperCollins settled the suit for $1.5 million. Love then issued a press release that included sworn deposition quotes from Wilson stating that some parts of the book were "absolute bullshit", "absolutely fiction" and "all garbage". According to Love, the suit allowed his lawyer access to interview transcripts in which Wilson confirmed "that I had been the inspiration of the group and that I had written many of the songs" that were the subject of Love's 1992 lawsuit for songwriting credits. Other defamation lawsuits were filed by Brother Records, Carl Wilson and the Wilsons' mother Audree. Their lawyers argued that HarperCollins was aware that Brian's statements in the book were either manipulated or written by Landy.

== See also ==
- Sweet Insanity
