= Brian Wilson: I Just Wasn't Made for These Times =

- Theatrical release poster
- Directed by: Don Was
- Written by: Don Was
- Produced by: Don Was; Jonathon Ker
- Starring: Brian Wilson
- Cinematography: Wyatt Troll
- Edited by: Helen Lowe
- Distributed by: Miramax
- Release date: January 25, 1995
- Running time: 70 minutes
- Country: United States
- Language: English
- Box office: $56,744 (USA)

Brian Wilson: I Just Wasn't Made for These Times is a 1995 biographical musical film directed by Don Was, centered on Brian Wilson of the Beach Boys. Through interviews with Brian and the Wilson family, the documentary examines the ups and downs of Wilson's life, including the early years of the Beach Boys, his years of substance abuse, and his long road to recovery. A soundtrack, I Just Wasn't Made for These Times, accompanied its release.

Its name derives from the Beach Boys' song "I Just Wasn't Made for These Times", released on Pet Sounds (1966). According to Was, he created the documentary to enlighten "non-musicians" of the significance of Wilson's work and to explain why the phrase "Brian Wilson is a genius" had become "holy gospel" among musicians.

For the 2014 biopic Love and Mercy, director Bill Pohlad cast John Cusack as Wilson based on the real Wilson's mannerisms and appearance in I Just Wasn't Made for These Times. Cusack later recommended the documentary as a "companion piece" to the biopic.

== Cast ==
- Brian Wilson
- Tony Asher
- Hal Blaine
- John Cale
- David Crosby
- Daniel Harrison
- Daniel Hutton
- Al Jardine
- David Leaf
- Melinda Ledbetter
- Thurston Moore
- Graham Nash
- Van Dyke Parks
- Tom Petty
- Linda Ronstadt
- Lenny Waronker
- Audree Wilson
- Carl Wilson
- Carnie Wilson
- Wendy Wilson
- Marilyn Wilson-Rutherford
