= Eugene Landy =

American psychologist (1934–2006)

- Born: Eugene Ellsworth Landy; November 26, 1934; Pittsburgh, Pennsylvania, U.S.
- Died: March 22, 2006 (aged 71); Honolulu, Hawaii, U.S.
- Other name: Gene Landy
- Education: California State University, Los Angeles (BA, 1964); University of Oklahoma (PhD, 1968)
- Occupations: Psychologist, therapist, writer, record producer, businessman
- Organizations: Foundation for the Rechanneling of Emotions and Education (1972–?); Brains & Genius (1989–1991)
- Known for: 24-hour therapy and exploitation of Brian Wilson
- Notable work: The Underground Dictionary (author); Brian Wilson (executive producer); Sweet Insanity (co-producer)
- Partner: Alexandra Morgan (1975–2006)

Eugene Ellsworth Landy (November 26, 1934 – March 22, 2006) was an American psychologist known for his controversial 24-hour therapy program and treatment of celebrity clients. Landy's regimen involved supervising and micromanaging his client's life with a team of counselors and doctors. His most notable patient was the Beach Boys' Brian Wilson, with whom he formed a business and creative partnership in the 1980s.

Born in Pittsburgh, Pennsylvania, Landy aspired to show business as a teenager, working odd jobs as a radio producer, and was an early manager to guitarist George Benson. During the 1960s, Landy studied psychology, earning his doctorate at the University of Oklahoma. After moving to Los Angeles, he treated many celebrity clients, including musician Alice Cooper and actors Richard Harris, Rod Steiger, Maureen McCormick, and Gig Young.

Brian Wilson became a patient of Landy's program in 1975. Landy was discharged within a year due to his burdensome fees. In 1982, Landy was re-employed as Wilson's therapist, subsequently becoming his executive producer, business manager, co-songwriter, and business adviser. Landy co-wrote and co-produced Wilson's first two solo projects, Brian Wilson (1988) and the unreleased Sweet Insanity (1990), and allegedly ghostwrote portions of Wilson's first memoir Wouldn't It Be Nice: My Own Story (1991).

In 1989, the state of California revoked Landy's professional license amidst accusations of ethical violations and patient misconduct. Although Landy ceased to be Wilson's psychologist, Landy continued to act as Wilson's business partner until a 1992 restraining order barred Landy from contacting the musician. Landy then continued his practice with licensure in New Mexico and Hawaii until his death from lung cancer at the age of 71. His treatment of Wilson was dramatized in the 2014 biopic Love & Mercy, in which Landy is portrayed by Paul Giamatti.

== Background ==
Eugene Ellsworth Landy was born on November 26, 1934, in Pittsburgh, Pennsylvania, the only child of Jules C. Landy, a medical doctor and psychology professor, and Frieda Mae Gordon Landy, also a psychology professor. At the age of five, Eugene was revealed to have an IQ of 150 after being tested at the University of Pittsburgh.

Landy dropped out of school in the sixth grade, later claiming to be dyslexic. At age 16, he pursued a career in show business, producing a nationally syndicated radio show, and discovering 10-year-old George Benson. Landy briefly served as Benson's manager and worked odd jobs as a radio producer, promoting records and producing a single for Frankie Avalon. Benson later stated, "My people developed a distrust for [Landy] when he made them sign a power of attorney that they didn't understand, and he got all my mail and all my checks."

Honoring his parents' wishes, Landy resumed his formal education at Los Angeles City College, where he earned an Associate of Arts degree in chemistry. After falling ill with dysentery while attending medical school at the National Autonomous University of Mexico, he switched to psychology. He earned a bachelor's degree in psychology from California State University, Los Angeles in 1964 and a master's degree in the discipline from the University of Oklahoma in 1967, completing his training with a PhD from the latter institution in 1968.

== Early career and development of methods ==
The success of 24-hour therapy rests on the extent to which the therapeutic team can exert control over every aspect of the patient's life. [The therapy would] totally disrupt the privacy of their patient's lives, gaining complete control over every aspect of their physical, personal, social and sexual environments. [The goal is to] teach them how to develop a strong sense of self-sufficiency and control over their lives.

— Eugene Landy, Handbook of Innovative Psychotherapies, 1981

After completing his studies, Landy worked for the Peace Corps, eventually moving to Los Angeles to work as a drug counselor at Harbor Hospital and as a popular part-time instructor at San Fernando Valley State College. Landy began developing ideas for his 24-hour treatment program while engaging in postdoctoral work in Rancho Santa Fe. It was there that he practiced "marathon therapy", in which a therapist takes control of a group of people for a day or more. In 1968, he worked briefly as an intern at Gateways Hospital in Echo Park, Los Angeles, where he developed his methods further, experimenting with treatment on teenage drug abusers with varying degrees of success. He attributed his failures to having too little control over their nighttime activities; he tried evening rap groups and made himself available at all hours for talking therapies for their nocturnal anxiety attacks. Landy went on to call his new system milieu therapy.

While serving the hospital, Landy became cultured in the language used by its teenagers. In 1971, he authored a book on hippie jargon called The Underground Dictionary, published by Simon & Schuster.

Around 1972, Landy founded a Beverly Hills clinic, the Foundation for the Rechanneling of Emotions and Education (FREE). Interns employed at the clinic used Landy's approach on a partial basis. In the early 1970s, he also started penetrating Hollywood social circles, becoming a consultant on various television shows, including The Bob Newhart Show. He soon began treating many celebrity clients, earning $200 an hour (~$1,425 in 2022 terms).

Some of Landy's patients included Alice Cooper; Richard Harris; Rod Steiger; and Gig Young, who died in an apparent murder-suicide along with his wife in 1978. In a 1976 interview with Rolling Stone, Landy claimed that he had treated others, but that he was in no position to explain his background. He added, "I've treated a tremendous number of people in show business; for some reason I seem to be able to relate to them. I think I have a nice reputation that says I'm unorthodox by orthodox standards but basically unique by unorthodox standards." Unusually, he had his own press kit.

In 1988, psychiatrist and Landy colleague Sol Samuels described Landy as "a maverick in the field of psychology. He's done things that no other psychologist has done in treating the psychotic and the drug addict. ... What he was doing really was translating the hospital environment to the home environment. I think he got some remarkable results – with people who can afford it." Arnold Horowitz, who was an assistant to Landy in the 1970s, stated that Landy used methods that were based "upon very very heavily reality confrontation on a very consistent basis. ... Gene, in addition to being eloquent at times ... is ... dramatic."

== First treatment of Brian Wilson (1975–1976) ==
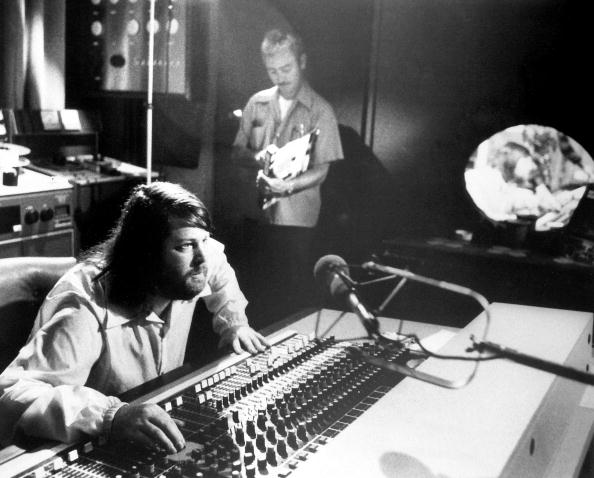
Brian Wilson producing the Beach Boys' album 15 Big Ones in 1976

Landy was initially hired to treat Brian Wilson by Wilson's then-wife Marilyn in October 1975. According to Marilyn, she had "tried to find doctors who could deal with" her husband for several years, but "Brian's ability to 'put on' these professionals made it difficult to find someone who could deal with him on his own level." During the previous spring and summer, she had employed Wilson's cousin, basketball player Stan Love, to supervise Wilson's daily activities and reverse his physical decline. Psychiatrists and therapists were then found for Wilson, but he refused to attend sessions. After hearing about Landy from a friend, Marilyn met with him to discuss the situation. Landy told her that Brian was an "undiagnosed and untreated schizophrenic." Marilyn said that, during one of Landy's visits to their home, "Brian just walked in the room and said, 'Something's wrong with me. I need your help,' and that started it all."

Wilson publicly rebelled against the program, saying that the only reason that he went along with it was so that he would not be committed to a psychiatric facility. Under Landy's program, he was forced to maintain a routine of exercise and productivity, as well as limit his meetings with friends that were deemed as negative influences. In Landy's own words,

I had to be crazier than Brian. There is only room enough for one crazy person in Brian's head, and that's got to be me. I have to be the ultimate power in this situation. ... I said he had to get out of bed and start living a normal life, and he said, "Make me." How do you make a guy get out of bed after so long? Explain it to him first? No. You throw water on him first. That's just what I did. I warned him, and then threw water on him and he got up.

Beach Boys road manager Rick Nelson later claimed that Landy had attempted to exert unwelcome artistic control over the group. During the recording of the band's album 15 Big Ones (1976), group meetings were supervised by Landy, and discussions over each song for the record were reported to last for up to eight hours. Another report suggested that Landy had asked for a percentage of the band's income. At Landy's insistence, Wilson appeared on Saturday Night Live, choosing to perform a solo piano rendition of "Good Vibrations" which received mixed feedback. Landy stood off-camera holding signs for Wilson that read "smile". He said that critics missed the point of this exercise, explaining that Wilson's performance "was a terrible thing" as a one-shot, but if he continued making appearances then he would have gradually overcome his stage fright.

Landy had initially charged a monthly fee of $10,000, which he gradually raised to $18,000. Steve Love, Wilson's cousin and band manager, fired Landy in December 1976 when Landy raised his fees to $20,000 (equivalent to $113,000 in 2025). By this time, Marilyn had become disenchanted with the doctor and his requests for additional compensation. She recalled confronting Landy at his office with her husband. "Brian said, 'You son of a bitch!' You have to understand that I have never seen Brian get physical, ever, ever. I saw him take his fist and start to punch this man, and I started screaming. Landy said, "No, no, no, let him do it, let him do it! ... he needs to take his anger out on me...' That was a therapeutic session, if you can believe it."

Landy remembered 15 Big Ones as "the only major success" the Beach Boys had in recent years; "Brian and I did that together. Right after that, I had to leave the situation. ... I was interested in making Brian a whole human being; they [the Beach Boys management] were interested in getting another album done in time for 1977." In 1977, Wilson was asked if Landy had too much control; he said, "I thought so, but there was nothing I could do about it and I eventually gave in to it. ... [He had] control of my life legally through the commitment of my wife. ... He definitely helped me. It cost over a hundred thousand dollars – he charged a hell of a lot per month." Wilson then reported that Landy was replaced with a different doctor.

== Second treatment of Brian Wilson (1982–1991) ==
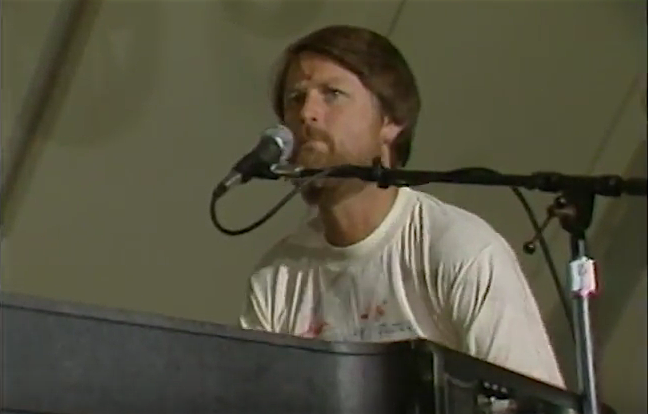
Wilson performing with the Beach Boys in 1983

In 1982, Wilson was brought back to Landy's care after overdosing on a combination of alcohol, cocaine, and other psychoactive drugs. Landy monitored Wilson's drug intake and used the psychiatrist Sol Samuels to prescribe Wilson medication. Landy's assistant Kevin Leslie stood with Wilson at every moment, earning Leslie the nickname "Surf Nazi". Leslie also gave Wilson medication at Landy's direction. Initially, Leslie was paid salary by Landy, but was eventually paid directly by Wilson. In 1988, Samuels took credit with performing the "actual supervision of the therapy ... giving the medication and the occasional psychotherapy as he needs it. What Gene has been doing is hiring the people to be with him, and so forth, much as a parent would do if asked to get some help in the house."

In the mid-1980s, Landy stated of Wilson, "I influence all of his thinking. I'm practically a member of the band ... [We're] partners in life." Wilson later responded to popular allegations, "People say that Dr. Landy runs my life, but the truth is, I'm in charge." Landy echoed: "He's got a car phone in his car. If he wants to call somebody, he calls somebody. ... He can go anywhere, on his own, anytime he wants." A Rolling Stone journalist who spent one week with Wilson and Landy reported: "With the exception of taking a brief drive by himself to the market to pick up groceries, Brian appeared to be incapable of making a move without Landy's okay. During one interview session, the Landy line seemed to ring every thirty minutes. Yet Brian appears to be a willing participant in the program."

Even though the Beach Boys had hired Landy, part of the regimen involved cutting Wilson's contact from the group, as Landy reasoned: "You can't deal with people who only want to use you." Wilson said that "Dr. Landy doesn't like me to be in touch with my family too much. He thinks it's unhealthy." For example, Brian remembered participating in an interview with his brother Carl Wilson, "and the interviewer asked Carl what it was between him and me. He goes, 'Well, Brian and I don't have to talk to each other. We're just Beach Boys, but we don't need to be friends.' And that's true. Although, whenever I think about him, I feel rotten."

In 1986, Wilson met his future wife and manager Melinda Ledbetter, a Cadillac saleswoman and former model, while browsing through a car dealership. Six months after meeting Wilson, she had reported Landy to the state's attorney general, who informed her that nothing could be done without the cooperation of Wilson's family. Ledbetter felt that the family had been at their "rope's end" with Wilson, and that they did not know what to do to help him. She said that three years into their relationship, Landy ordered Wilson to sever ties with her.

=== Music and business associations ===
Between 1983 and 1986, Landy charged about $430,000 annually, forcing Wilson's family members to devote some publishing rights to his fee. Landy received 25% of the copyright to all of Wilson's songs, regardless of whether he contributed to them or not, which band manager Tom Hulett explained was an incentive for Landy to reignite Wilson's drive. "It was sort of like, 'Gee, there's nothing coming in now, if you can go make this person well to go create some income ...'" Landy expressed similar views. "Saying that [I would share in future songwriting royalties] in '84 was like me telling you, 'I'll pay you a million dollars if you can get up and fly around the room.'" This arrangement was revoked in 1985, with Landy only receiving rights with a percentage equal to his writing contributions. Landy reported that he never received any money, since Wilson had not published any material before the pact was voided. Afterward, Wilson paid Landy a salary of about $300,000 a year for advice on creative decisions.

Brian Wilson – "Smart Girls" (1991)
Landy co-produced the unreleased track "Smart Girls". In 2015, Wilson remembered of the song: "we were just having a good time. ... it was fun."

In late 1987, Landy and Wilson became creative partners in a company called Brains and Genius, a business venture where each member would contribute equally and share any profits from recordings, films, soundtracks, or books. Landy was then credited as co-writer and executive producer for Wilson's debut solo album, Brian Wilson, released in 1988. Co-producer Russ Titelman disparaged Landy's role in the album's creation, calling him disruptive and "anti-creative". Wilson's cousin and bandmate Mike Love denied Landy's claims that the Beach Boys were preventing Wilson from participating on their recordings, and believed that the reason Landy encouraged Wilson to pursue a solo career "was to destroy us. Then he would be the sole custodian of Brian's career and legacy." Landy maintained that his songwriting collaborations on Brian Wilson earned him less than $50,000.

In an October 1991 Billboard article, Landy falsely claimed to have "cut" (produced) the 1965 hit "Eve of Destruction". This prompted the record's co-producer P.F. Sloan to pen a letter to Billboard that refuted Landy's claim. Sloan later surmised that Landy had made the claim in order to gain credibility and appease members of the medical community who were questioning why Landy felt that he was an appropriate songwriting collaborator for Wilson.

For the publishing of Wilson's autobiographic memoir, Wouldn't It Be Nice: My Own Story, Landy stood to earn 30% of its proceeds. The book glorifies Landy and its contents were challenged for plagiarism. Landy denied accusations that he was involved as a ghostwriter. Wilson later distanced himself from the book. In a 1995 court case, Wilson's lawyers argued that HarperCollins were aware that Wilson's statements in the book were either manipulated or written by Landy.

=== State intervention ===
Action was taken against Landy's professional practice as a result of the Beach Boys' and Wilson family's struggles for control. A former nurse and girlfriend of Wilson's brought Landy to the state's attention in 1984. The state was then aided by journals written by songwriter Gary Usher during a ten-month collaboration with Wilson. These journals depicted Wilson as a virtual captive dominated by Landy, who was determined to fulfill his show business ambitions through Wilson. By this time, Wilson had become Landy's only patient.

In February 1988, the State of California Board of Medical Quality charged Landy with ethical and license code violations stemming from the improper prescription of drugs and various unethical personal and professional relationships with patients, citing one case of sexual misconduct with a female patient, along with Wilson's psychological dependency on Landy. Landy denied the allegations, but later admitted to one of the seven charges which accused him of wrongfully prescribing drugs to Wilson. Landy surrendered his psychological license, complying with an agreement made with the state of California, and was not allowed applications for reinstatement for the next two years.

[Wilson] still has an oral drive. He would still overeat and overdose if you let him. He has total freedom in every other way.

— Wilson's psychiatrist Sol Samuels, 1988

An August 1988 board meeting with the Beach Boys had Landy promising that Brian would reconnect with the group, which Love says: "was a ruse to get us to write a letter in his defense against the California authorities. We never wrote the letter, and Brian's public behavior continued to unsettle." Landy and his colleagues said that his treatment of Wilson ended in February 1988 at the request of the state attorney general's office, but the deputy attorney who drafted the complaint reported that he was not aware of any such request, nor was the office advised that they sever Landy's relationship with Wilson. Co-producers of Wilson's solo album said they witnessed no changes, and Landy's assistants remained with Wilson. Sol Samuels said this was because Landy had little direct involvement with Wilson's treatment, and that it was instead the people Landy hired who continued to regulate Wilson's medication.

=== Conservatorship hearings ===
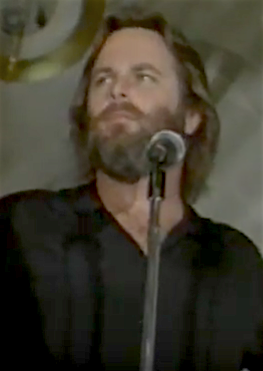
Brian's then-girlfriend (and later wife) Melinda sought family help to protect Brian from Landy, but it still took three years of meetings with Brian's brother Carl and his lawyers before Carl acted. (pictured 1983)

Peter Reum, a therapist who met Wilson while attending a Beach Boys fan convention in 1990, was alarmed by Wilson's demeanor and speculated that he might have tardive dyskinesia, a neurological condition brought on by prolonged usage of antipsychotic medication. Reum phoned noted Beach Boys biographer David Leaf, who then reported Reum's observations to Carl Wilson. It was then discovered that Landy had been named as a chief beneficiary in a 1989 revision of Brian's will, collecting 70%, with the remainder split between his girlfriend and Brian's two daughters. This discovery was made by Kay Gilmer, a publicist employed by Landy in March 1990. She phoned Gary Usher to explain why his messages were not being returned, to which Usher warned: "If Landy knows that you're calling me, he'd kill you. He'd literally kill you." Gilmer left her job two weeks later, taking expired drug bottles as well as names, phone numbers, and bank account information that she later turned over to the California Board of Medical Quality Assurance.

Aided by Gilmer's findings, Stan Love filed unsuccessfully for conservatorship on May 17, 1990. A press conference with Stan at the lectern featured an unexpected appearance from Brian. While reading from a piece of paper, Brian was given a microphone and said: "I have heard of the charges made by Stan Love, and I think they are outrageous, which means they are out of the ballpark ... I feel great." In a later interview from 1991, Brian acknowledged the revision of his will and repeatedly stated, "We might change that".

Audree, Carl, Carnie, and Wendy Wilson contested Landy's control of Brian, pursuing legal action on May 7, 1991. Brian responded in an interview, "They probably want control of me, but they will not get it, they will not get it. I say let sleeping dogs lie. If the formula works, don't goof with it. That's one of my major philosophies in life. It's been working." The ruling was finalized on February 3, 1992, when Landy was barred by court order from contacting Brian, leaving his affairs to the hands of conservator Jerome S. Billet. In December 1992, Landy was fined $1,000 for violating the court order when he visited Brian in June for his birthday.

Landy estimated that, from 1983 to 1991, his fees had cost Wilson approximately $3 million. In 1991, Wilson told reporters that his prescribed medications included Cogentin, Eskalith, Xanax, Navane, and Serentil.

=== Love & Mercy ===
Landy's treatment of Wilson in the 1980s was dramatized in the 2014 biographical film Love & Mercy, in which Landy is portrayed by Paul Giamatti. These events are told from the point of view of Wilson's then-girlfriend Melinda Ledbetter. Screenwriter Oren Moverman stated that virtually everything in the 1980s portions was sourced from conversations he had with Ledbetter. He felt that Landy was the most difficult character to write for, "even though many things that he says in the movie I actually have recording of, in real life he was a cartoon and in real life he was so over the top." Giamatti said he prepared for the role by meeting Landy's early career acquaintances and listening to hours of tapes where "he'd just keep talking and talking, in these completely huge paragraphs. They were brilliant-sounding, but if you dug into them they didn't make much sense."

Landy's son Evan disputed the film's accuracy, believing that his father was unfairly portrayed. Mike Love commented that Evan's account was "very interesting because you get an intimate look at someone who was with Brian every day for a few years." Although he had not watched the film, he also said that it overstated Ledbetter's role in stopping the treatment. Both Brian Wilson and Melinda Ledbetter have attested to the accuracy of the film's portrayal of Eugene Landy, with Brian Wilson stating "[Giamatti] was very scary as Landy—he even got his voice right." Ledbetter said: "After I first saw the film, I had to just drive around for a couple of hours to clear my head, then I remembered that what Landy did to Brian was even worse. You don't get a sense of it in the movie, but it happened on a daily basis, for years."

== Personal life ==
Landy's first three marriages ended in divorce. Margalit Fox, obituarist for The New York Times, identified longtime domestic partner Alexandra Morgan as his fourth wife and survivor. Morgan is also listed as a collaborator on Sweet Insanity and in other public-facing comments by Wilson from then.

He had at least one son, Evan (born 1961/1962), from his second marriage.

== Death ==
After the 1990s, Landy continued a psychotherapeutic practice with licensure in New Mexico and Hawaii until his death. He died, aged 71, on March 22, 2006, in Honolulu, Hawaii, of pneumonia complicated by lung cancer.

Asked what his reaction to Landy's death had been, Wilson responded: "I was devastated." Wilson's daughter Carnie quoted her father saying, "Dr. Landy died today. I know a lot of people didn't like him, but I loved him."

== Legacy ==
I don't regret it. I loved the guy—he saved me. Exercise saved me. There is no drug in the world like it. He pushed me beyond my limits and stopped me being fearful of the world.

— Brian Wilson discussing Landy in a 2002 interview

In 2015, Wilson reflected, "I thought he was my friend, but he was a very fucked-up man," and also, "I still feel that there was benefit. I try to overlook the bad stuff, and be thankful for what he taught me."

Music producer Don Was commented in 1995 that Wilson had been "so different from his public image as a drug burnout or of someone catatonic and propped up by a greedy psychologist. ... I knew Landy. I was around for the tail end of it, and I saw some gray in there; he wasn't just this evil guy who took over Brian."

Mike Love said in a 2004 interview, "He was very tough and egregious and scandalously expensive with Brian's money. But I have to give credit for saving Brian's life. ... He was the only guy we knew who could handle Brian because Brian was a monumental case."

== Bibliography ==
- Badman, Keith (2004). The Beach Boys: The Definitive Diary of America's Greatest Band, on Stage and in the Studio. Backbeat Books. ISBN 978-0-87930-818-6.
- Carlin, Peter Ames (2006). Catch a Wave: The Rise, Fall, and Redemption of the Beach Boys' Brian Wilson. Rodale. ISBN 978-1-59486-320-2.
- Corsini, Raymond J. (1981). Handbook of Innovative Psychotherapies. New York: Wiley. ISBN 978-0-471-06229-5.
- Dillon, Mark (2012). Fifty Sides of the Beach Boys: The Songs That Tell Their Story. ECW Press. ISBN 978-1-77090-198-8.
- Gaines, Steven (1986). Heroes and Villains: The True Story of The Beach Boys. New York: Da Capo Press. ISBN 0-306-80647-9.
- Granata, Charles L. (2003). Wouldn't It Be Nice: Brian Wilson and the Making of the Beach Boys' Pet Sounds. A Cappella Books. ISBN 9781556525070.
- Love, Mike (2016). Good Vibrations: My Life as a Beach Boy. Penguin Publishing Group. ISBN 978-0-698-40886-9.
- White, Timothy (1996). The Nearest Faraway Place: Brian Wilson, the Beach Boys, and the Southern Californian Experience. Macmillan. ISBN 0333649370.
