= List of unreleased songs recorded by the Beach Boys =

The Beach Boys recorded a myriad of songs, instrumentals, and alternate versions of tracks that have been withheld from release. Some tracks circulate on bootlegs; others have been lost since their creation. This list is ordered chronologically by recording date. Live recordings are included if there is no studio equivalent.

== 1962–1964 ==
1962

- "Beginning of the End": Written by Roger Christian and Gary Usher. In early April 1962, Brian Wilson and Usher recorded demos of four songs at Western Recorders with instrumental and vocal backing by the Beach Boys. Group member David Marks was not present during the session. Lead vocal by Brian.
- "My Only Alibi": Written by Gary Usher. Recorded in early April 1962 during the Wilson-Usher demo session at Western. The song features a lead vocal by Usher, backing vocals by Brian and Carl Wilson, and instrumentation by the Beach Boys.
- "One Way Road to Love": Written by Gary Usher. Recorded in early April 1962 during the Wilson-Usher demo session at Western. The song features a lead vocal by Usher, backing vocals by Brian and Carl, and instrumentation by the Beach Boys.
- "Visions": Written by Brian Wilson and Gary Usher. Recorded in early April 1962 during the Wilson-Usher demo session at Western. The song features a lead vocal by Brian and instrumentation by the Beach Boys. Later recorded by Rachel and the Revolvers and retitled "Number One".

1963

- "Pink Champagne": An instrumental composition written by Al Jardine and recorded in February 1963. Jardine copyrighted the piece on February 28, 1963. Murry Wilson later recorded the composition for his album The Many Moods of Murry Wilson under the title "Italia".
- "Chopsticks Boogie": Written by Brian Wilson and Jan Berry. Recorded around April–June 1963.
- "Rockin' Roadster": Written by Brian Wilson and Roger Christian. Recorded around June–September 1963.
- "Malibu Sunset": Written by Brian Wilson, Gary Usher, and Roger Christian. Recorded around May–August 1963.

1964

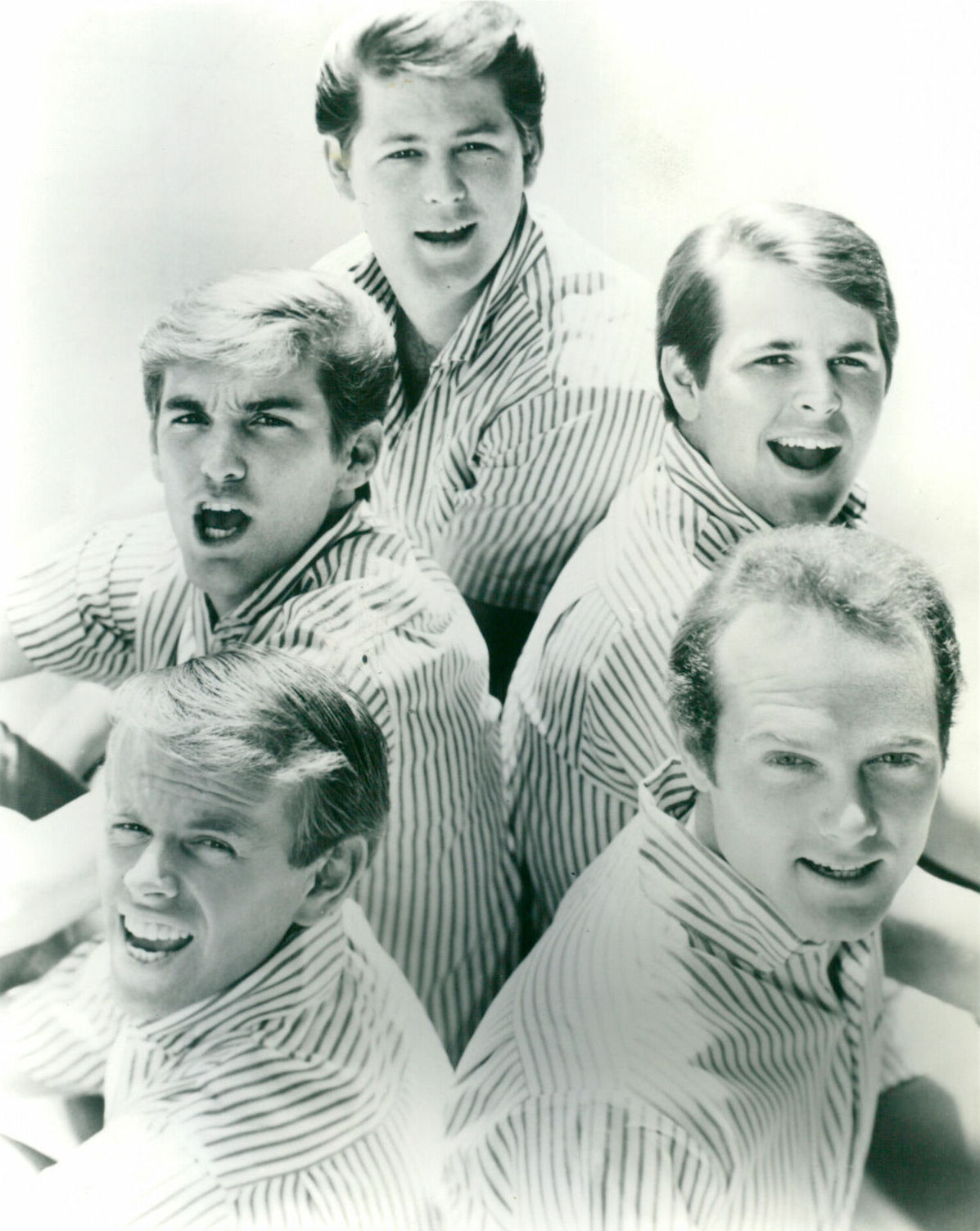
The Beach Boys in 1964

- "Sandy Baby": Written by Brian Wilson and Russ Titelman and recorded in 1964. The song is an early version of "Sherry She Needs Me"; no vocal was recorded.

== 1965–1969 ==
1965

- "How Deep Is the Ocean?": Written by Irving Berlin and recorded on October 15, 1965.
- "Stella by Starlight": Written by Victor Young and recorded on October 15, 1965.

1966

- Alternate version of "Heroes and Villains": In 2013, a version incorporating "I'm in Great Shape" surfaced on an acetate. Missing tapes, presumed lost or erased, include the reels for sessions held on May 11, December 13, December 19, and December 28, 1966, as well as January 20, January 31, February 24, February 26, and March 15, 1967.
- Alternate version of "Look": Recorded on October 13, 1966 with vocals. This tape is missing, presumed lost or erased.

1967

- Alternate version of "Surf's Up": Recorded on January 23, 1967.
- "Crack the Whip" and "When I Get Mad (I Just Play My Drums)": Written by Brian Wilson and recorded around February–March 1967. Brian produced these tracks for photographer Jasper Dailey.
- Alternate version of "Tones": Recorded between March 13 and April 13, 1967. A version with vocals was recorded; the tape is missing, presumed lost or erased.
- "Good Time Mama": Attributed to Brian Wilson and recorded on June 25–26, 1967. In 2007, Alan Boyd stated that a tape with the label "Good Time Mama" could not be found in the band's archives.
- "Sunflower Maiden": Written by Brian Wilson and Van Dyke Parks and recorded in 1967. Written for the band Redwood, along with "Darlin'" and "Time to Get Alone". As of 2006, the recording remains lost.

1969

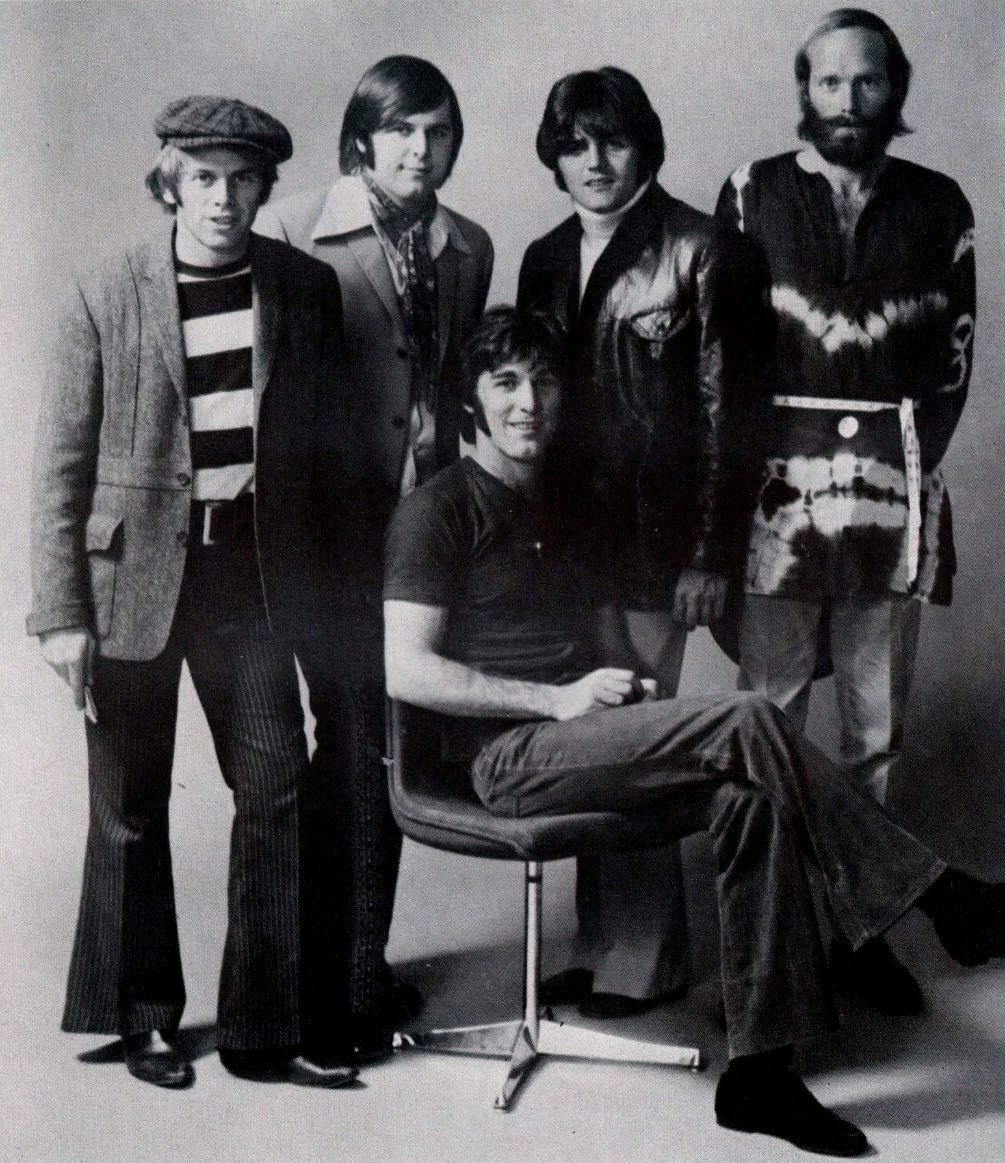
The Beach Boys in 1969

- "What Can the Matter Be": Unknown writer; recorded between February 24 and May 24, 1969.
- "Raspberries, Strawberries": Written by Will Holt and recorded on November 11, 1969. A Kingston Trio cover, the tape of this rendition was reworked as "At My Window".

== 1970–1973 ==
- "Song to God": Written by Brian Wilson. Reported to have existed by Stanley Shapiro, a friend of the Beach Boys that had written songs with Dennis. According to Shapiro, Dennis had asked engineer Stephen Desper to set up the tape on a reel-to-reel before Brian ripped it off the playback and yelled "Don't you ever touch that again! That's between me and God!" Asked in 2016, Desper wrote on a message board, "Never did Dennis and I hear such a song, nor did Brian come barreling into the studio." He described Shapiro's recollection as "replete with imagined gestures and simply put not true." As of 2026, the tape has not surfaced.

1970

- Alternate version of "A Day in the Life of a Tree": A version with Dennis on lead vocals. As of 2014, the tape has not surfaced.

1971

- "Change Partners": Written by Stephen Stills; a cover version recorded in December 1971.
- "Beatrice from Baltimore": Written by Brian Wilson and Tandyn Almer and recorded between December 6, 1971 and January 31, 1972. Possibly Carl sings lead vocal. Later evolved into "You Need a Mess of Help to Stand Alone".

1972

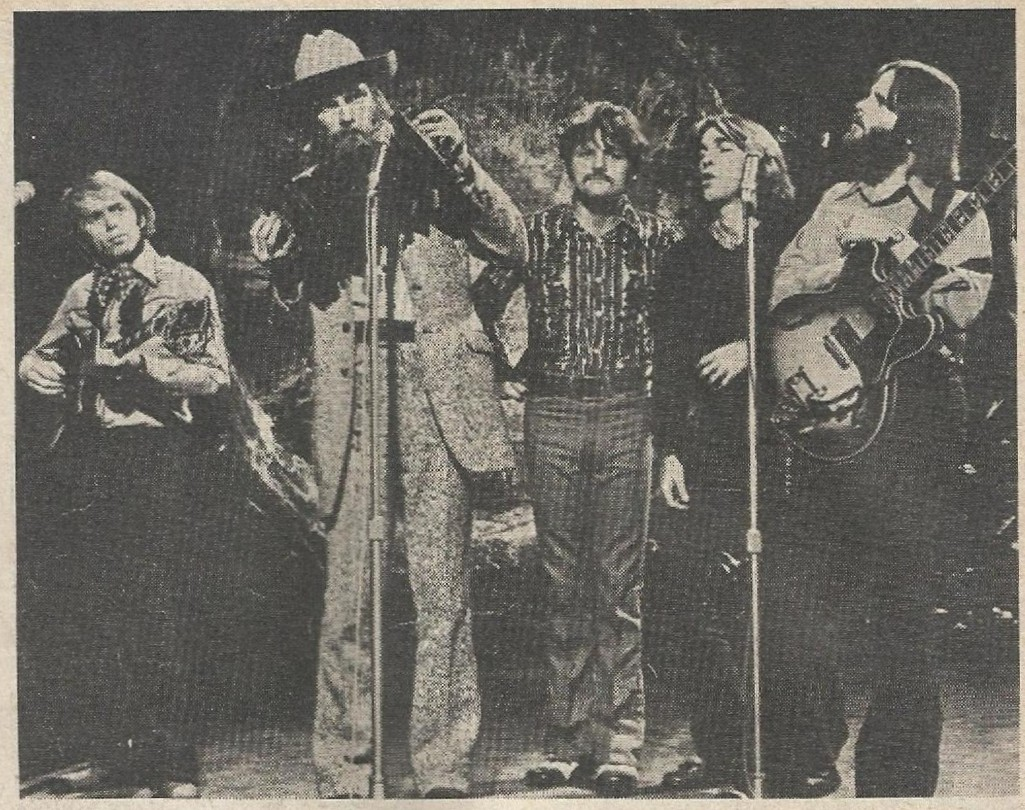
The Beach Boys performing in 1972

- "Burlesque": Written by Brian Wilson and Jack Rieley and recorded in 1972. A lyric is "Tantalation and hot glowing skin/Sun's 'bout to rest." Possibly Brian on lead vocal. As of 2014, no tape has surfaced.
- "Is Jack Rieley Really Superman?": Written by Brian Wilson and recorded in 1972. According to journalist Ben Edmonds, Brian wrote the song as a satire on Jack Rieley, who falsely claimed to have won a Pulitzer Prize. As of 2014, no tape has surfaced.
- "House of Lies": Written by Ricky Fataar and Blondie Chaplin; recorded in mid-1972, with lead vocal by Fataar and Chaplin.
- "I've Got Love": Written by Fataar and Chaplin; recorded in mid-1972, with lead vocal by Fataar and Chaplin.
- "Loretta Laredo": Written by Fataar and Chaplin; recorded in mid-1972, with lead vocal by Fataar and Chaplin.
- "I've Got a Friend": Written by Dennis Wilson; recorded live in early 1972.

1973

- Alternate version of "Child of Winter (Christmas Song)": A version with Carl and Dennis on lead vocals.
- "Dr. Tom": Written by Al Jardine and recorded on March 12, 1973. Adaptation of the folk standard "Tom Dooley", with Jardine singing a partial vocal.
- "Canyon Summer": Written by Al Jardine and recorded in May 1973. Copyrighted by Jardine on May 29, 1973. Jingle written for the Coppertone sun-tan lotion company.

== 1974–1976 ==
1974

- "Is This Really Love?": Attributed to Brian Wilson; recorded on June 10, 1974.
- "Just an Imitation": Written by Brian Wilson and recorded between May and September 1974. Written about Murry, who died one year earlier. As of 2014, no tape has surfaced. May feature Brian on lead vocal.
- "Why Don't You Try Me?": Unknown author; recorded between May and September 1974.
- "Earthquake Time": Written by Mike Love and recorded between October and November 1974.
- "You're Riding High On the Music": Written by Brian Wilson and Kalinich and recorded in December 1974.

1975

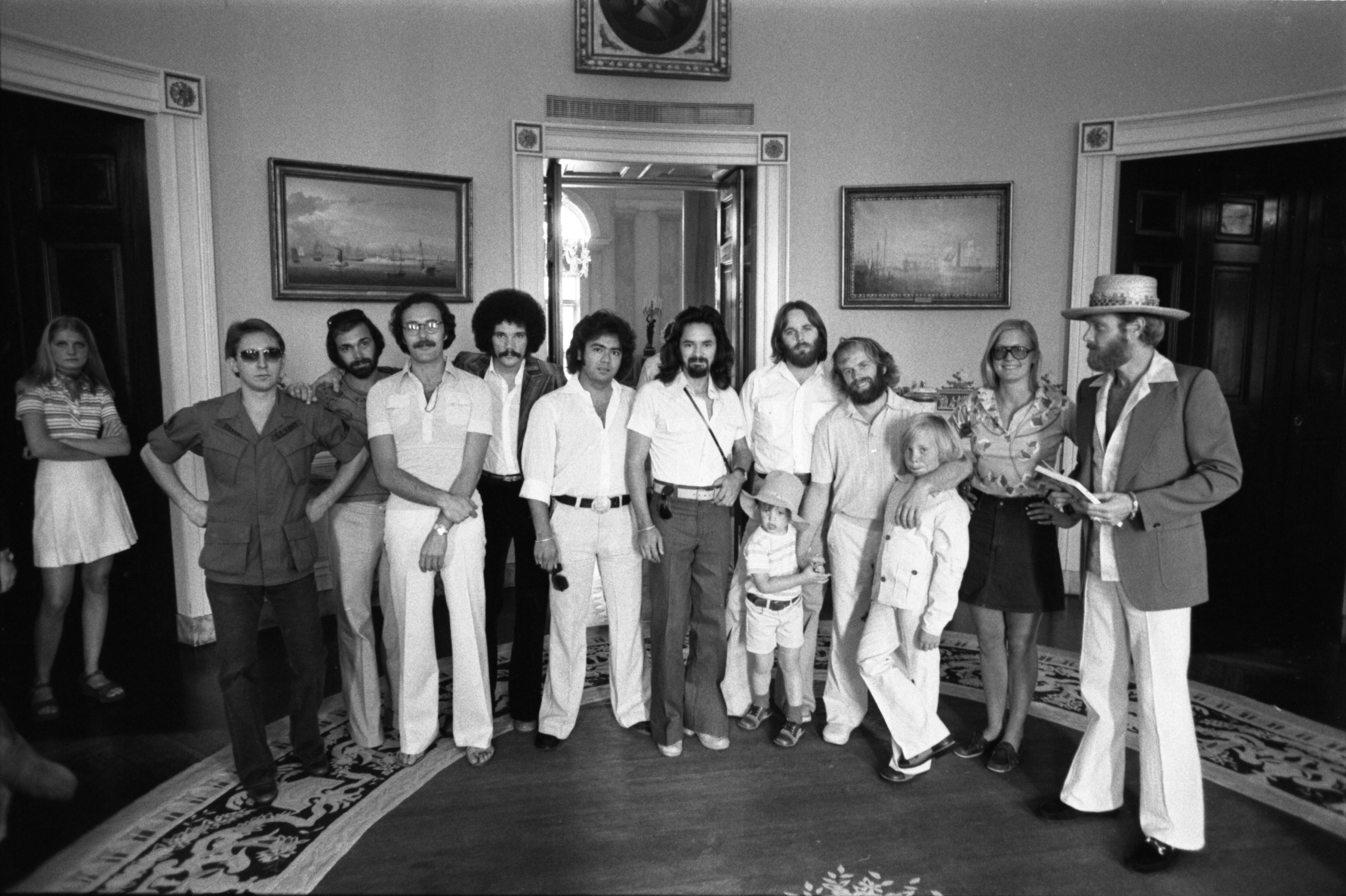
The Beach Boys visiting the White House in 1975

- "Don't Let Me Go": Written by Carl Wilson and Mike Love.
- "Our Life, Our Love, Our Land": Written by Mike Love.
- "Feelin' Stronger Every Day": Written by Peter Cetera and James Pankow and recorded between May and June 1975. Chicago song performed live, with lead vocals by Love and James Pankow.

1976

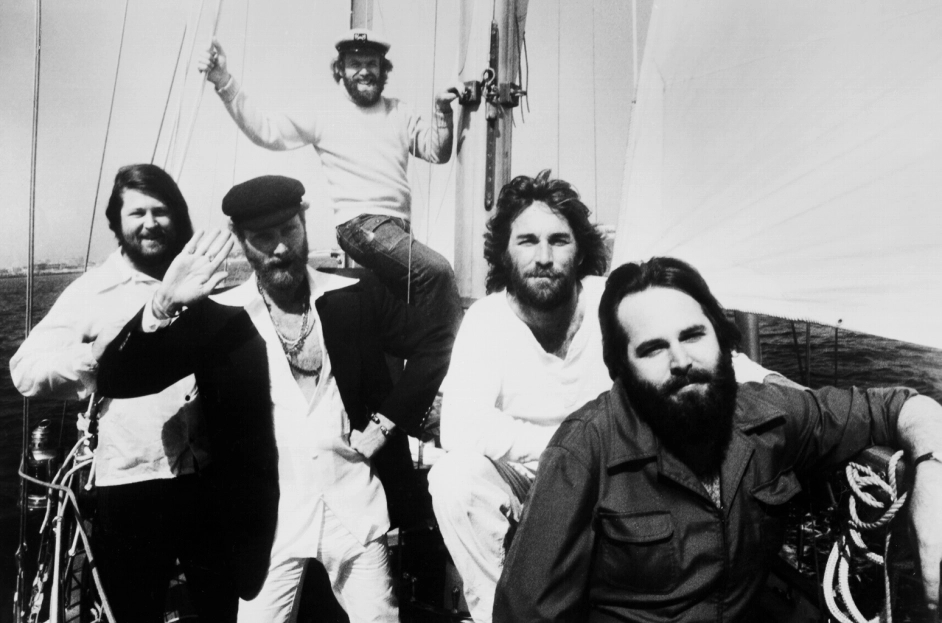
The Beach Boys in 1976

- "11th Bar Blues": Written by Brian Wilson and recorded in 1976 with lead vocal by Mike Love.
- "Gold Rush": Written by Al Jardine and recorded between January 30 and May 15, 1976.
- "Lisa": Written by Mike Love and recorded between January 30 and May 15, 1976 with lead vocal by Love.
- "Glow Crescent Glow": Written by Mike Love; recorded between January 30 and May 15, 1976, with an additional session in October–November 1978.
- "Secret Love": Written by Sammy Fain, Paul Francis Webster; recorded between January 30 and May 15, 1976.
- "Michael Row the Boat Ashore": Traditional folk song; recorded between April 16–29, 1976 with lead vocal by Love.
- "Let's Dance": Written by Jim Lee and recorded on April 27, 1976.

== 1977–1979 ==
1977

- "Mike, Come Back to L.A.": Written by Brian Wilson and recorded in October–November 1977; no lead vocal recorded. Evolved into "Some of Your Love".
- "Xmas Carol Medley": Recorded in October–November 1977. Christmas medley featuring the Beach Boys and their children singing as a group. The songs are "God Rest Ye Merry Gentlemen", "O Come All Ye Faithful", "Hark The Herald Angels Sing", and "We Wish You A Merry Christmas".
- "How's About a Little Bit of Your Sweet Lovin'?": Written by Brian Wilson, Mike Love, Diane Rovell, Ron Altbach; recorded on November 15, 1977 – November 29, 1979. A version was released by Celebration on their eponymous second album.
- "Beach Burlesque": Unknown author; recorded on November 17, 1977. An M.I.U. Album outtake that may be the same song as "Burlesque".
- "Go and Get That Girl": Written by Ed Tuleja and Ron Altbach; recorded on November 17–21, 1977, with lead vocal by Carl. Intended for release on Merry Christmas from the Beach Boys in 1978. A slightly different version was released by Celebration on their eponymous second album with a different backing track vocals by Dave Robinson.
- "Alone on Christmas Day": Written by Mike Love and Ron Altbach; recorded on November 17–23, 1977, with lead vocal by Love. Intended for release on Merry Christmas. Love re-recorded the song in 2015 and then again for his 2018 solo Christmas album Reason for the Season.
- "Sad, Sad Christmas": Written by Mike Love and recorded on November 23, 1977, with lead vocal by Love.

1978

- "I Really Love You": Written by Brian Wilson and recorded on April 21, 1978, with lead vocal by Brian.
- "Ride Arabian, Ride": Written by Al Jardine and recorded on May 11, 1978. Instrumental.
- "Rubles": Written by Al Jardine and recorded on May 11, 1978, with lead vocal by Jardine.
- "Basketball Rock": Written by Brian Wilson and recorded on May 13, 1978. Instrumental.
- "Bowling": Written by Brian Wilson and recorded on May 13, 1978. Instrumental.
- "Lookin' Down the Coast/Monterey": Written by Al Jardine and recorded on July 27, 1978, with lead vocals by Brian and Jardine. Intended to comprise a trilogy of songs which included "Santa Ana Winds". A re-recording of both songs, with the abbreviated title of "Lookin' Down the Coast", was included on Jardine's A Postcard from California album.
- "Calendar Girl": Written by Neil Sedaka and Howard Greenfield; recorded in late 1978 with lead vocals by Love.
- "A Little Somethin": Unknown author; recorded in late 1978 with lead vocals by Brian Wilson and Rocky Pamplin.
- "I'm Begging You Please": Written by Brian Wilson and recorded around June – October 6, 1978. Piano/vocal demo with lead vocal by Brian. A basic track was recorded. In 2008, Alan Boyd could not confirm if vocals were also tracked.
- "Drip Drop": Written by Leiber and Stoller; recorded on October 19, 1978, with lead vocal by Brian.

1979

- "California Beach": Written by Al Jardine and Mike Love; recorded in early 1979 with lead vocal by Love. A version appears on Love's 2019 album 12 Sides of Summer.
- "Skatetown U.S.A.": Written by Al Jardine and Mike Love; recorded in early 1979 with lead vocal by Love. Later reworked as "California Beach".
- "Little Girl": Written by Phil Spector, Ellie Greenwich, and Jeff Barry; recorded in early 1979 with lead vocal by Carl. Intended for Keepin' the Summer Alive, it was cut at a refurbished Western Studio 3 with Brian as producer. "Little Girl" was later adapted into an original song and renamed "Sunshine". Bruce Johnston explained: "Well, 'Sunshine' was originally called 'Little Girl'. And I can't remember who recorded it, probably a Phil Spector record, and so we cut this track and then we decided to write a new song to the track, so we took part of the old song, 'Smoky Places', and whatever Mike and Brian came up with, recorded on the existing track, didn't have enough room because the song was too short, so we tape-copied the track a few times, put 21 splices in the 24-track tape and stretched the song out and came up with 'Sunshine'."
- "Jamaica Farewell": Written by Harry Belafonte; recorded on July 23, 1979, without a lead vocal. Produced by Brian at the refurbished Western 3 studio. Not to be confused with a version by California Music, recorded in 1976 with Brian on organ.
- "Stranded in the Jungle": Written by The Jay Hawks; recorded on July 24, 1979, without vocals. Produced by Brian Wilson at Western 3 studio.
- "Johnny B. Goode": Written by Chuck Berry and recorded on October 15 – November 13, 1979. Keepin' the Summer Alive outtake, and one of only two songs from the album's sessions with Dennis drumming.
- "Surfer Suzie": Written by Ed Carter; recorded between October 10 and December 14, 1979 with lead vocal by Jardine. Keepin' the Summer Alive outtake recorded at Western.
- "Smoky Places": Written by the Corsairs (or A. Spector); recorded on October 18, 1979, with lead vocal by Brian. Later reworked as the Keepin' the Summer Alive track "Sunshine".
- "Boys and Girls": Written by Brian Wilson and recorded on October 19, 1979 – November 18, 1980. Keepin' the Summer Alive outtake, recorded at Western.
- "I'll Always Love You": Written by Barry Mann; recorded on November 19, 1979 – January 1980 with lead vocal by Carl. Keepin' the Summer Alive outtake.
- "Starbaby": Written by Mike Love and recorded on November 29, 1979, with lead vocal by Love. Keepin' the Summer Alive outtake. A version was released by Celebration with lead vocals by Paul Fauerso on their eponymous second album.

== 1980–1982 ==
1980

- "Song Within a Song": Written by Brian Wilson and recorded on May 21, 1980. Re-recording of "My Solution" in medley with "Shortenin' Bread".
- "River Deep – Mountain High": Written by Ellie Greenwich, Jeff Barry, and Phil Spector; recorded in July 1980 with lead vocal by Brian.
- "Be My Baby": Written by Ellie Greenwich, Jeff Barry, and Phil Spector; recorded in July 1980 with lead vocal by Mike Love. Overdubbed for release on Love's 1981 album Looking Back with Love.
- "Greenback Dollar": Written by Hoyt Axton and Kennard Ramsey.
- "I'm a Man": Written by Brian Wilson.
- "Fly": Unknown author; recorded on October 31, 1980.
- "Up Again": Unknown author; recorded on November 18, 1980.
- "Candlesticks": Unknown author; recorded on November 18, 1980.

1981

- "Oh Lord": Written by Brian Wilson and recorded in January 1981. One of several songs recorded by Brian during the so-called Cocaine Sessions at Garby Leon's beach house. Later "reportedly attempted" during July 1984 sessions for the band's 1985 self-titled album.
- "Stevie": Credited to Brian Wilson, Dennis Wilson, and Garby Leon or Brian Wilson alone. Written about Stevie Nicks of Fleetwood Mac. A cover was recorded by Saint Etienne and released on the tribute album Caroline Now!
- "I Ran (All the Way Home)": Unknown author; recorded in early 1981 with lead vocal by Love.
- "Sweetie": Written by Brian Wilson and recorded in early 1981. Lead vocal by Brian, Love, and Jardine. Solo demo recorded by Brian in 1986. Evolved into "Love Ya" which was intended for Brian's rejected solo album Sweet Insanity. In 2006, was reported to still exist in the tape vaults.

1982

- "City Blues": Written by Brian Wilson and Dennis Wilson; recorded in November 1982, with lead vocal by Brian.
- "I Feel So Fine": Written by Brian Wilson and recorded in November 1982, with lead vocal by Brian.
- "I Said a Prayer": Written by Brian Wilson and recorded in November 1982, with lead vocal by Brian.
- "Oh Lord": Written by Brian Wilson and recorded in November 1982, with lead vocal by Brian.

== 1983–2012 ==
1980s

- "The Boogie's Back in Town": Written by Brian Wilson and recorded in November 1983 with lead vocal by Brian. Live recording.
- "Buzz-Buzz-Buzz": Written by the Hollywood Flames and recorded in June 1984 – November 1984. Live recording; lead vocal by Jardine.
- "Down by the Pier": Unknown author; recorded in June 1984 – November 1984 with lead vocal by Carl.
- "Water Builds Up": Written by Brian Wilson and recorded in July 1984.
- "At the Hop": Written by Artie Singer, John Medora, and David White; recorded in October–November 1984 with lead vocal by Mike Love.
- "And I Always Will": Written by Al Jardine and recorded in October–November 1984. Later re-recorded by Jardine for his debut solo album, A Postcard from California (2010).
- "Rings": Written by Brian Wilson and recorded in early 1986 with lead vocal by Brian.
- "Walking on Water": Written by Brian Wilson and recorded in early 1986 with lead vocal by Brian.
- "Wouldn't That Be Cool": Unknown author; recorded in early 1986 with lead vocal by Brian.

1990s

- "Groovin'": Written by Felix Cavaliere and David Brigati; recorded in early 1992. Basic track recorded without vocal.
- "Grace of My Heart": Written by Brian Wilson and Mike Love; recorded on March 3, 1995.
- "Turn on Your Love Light": Written by Brian Wilson and Andy Paley; recorded on March 3, 1995.
- "Dancin' the Night Away": Written by Brian Wilson and Andy Paley; recorded in November 1995 with incomplete vocal.

2011−2012

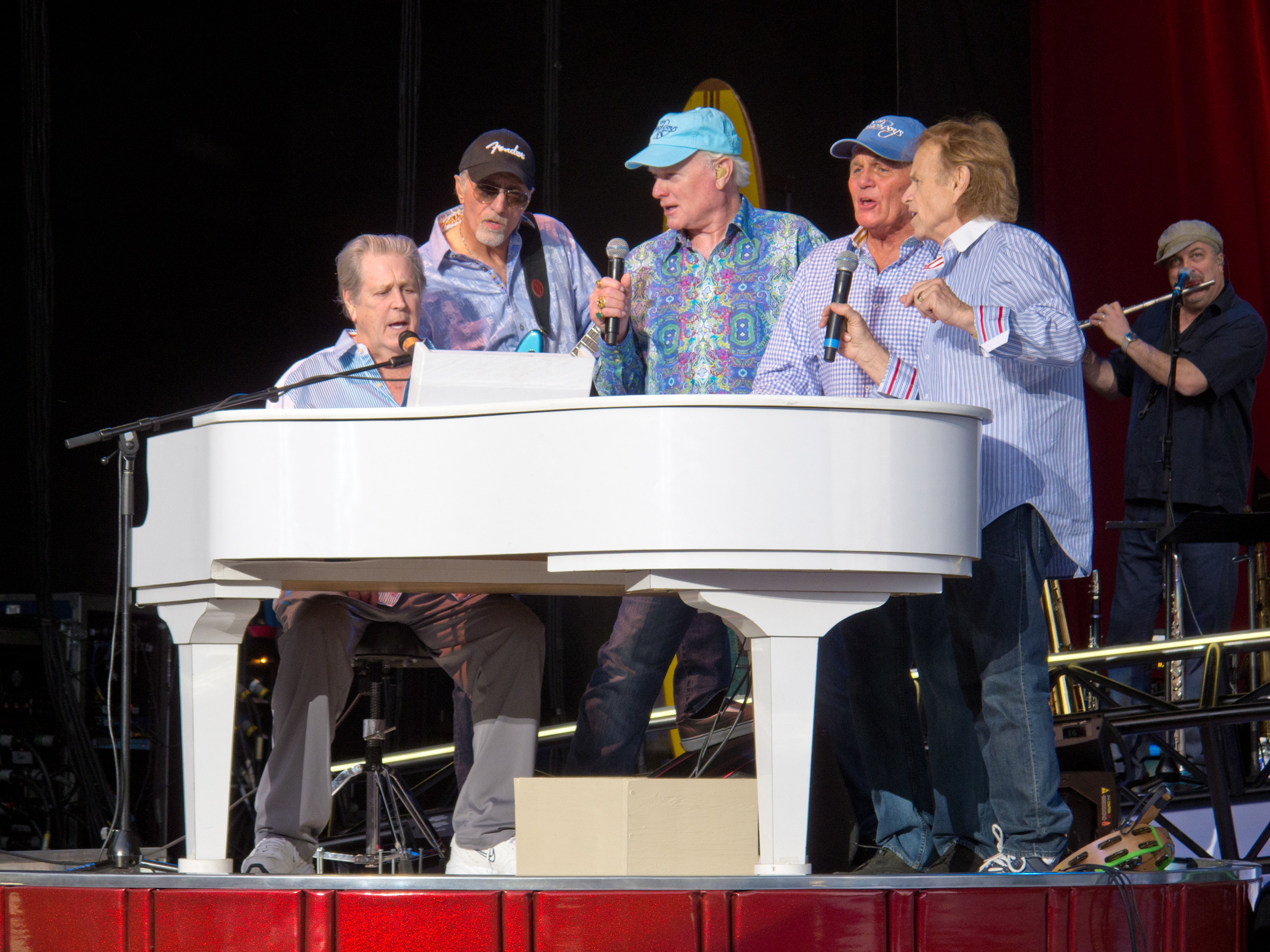
The Beach Boys in 2012

- "Waves of Love": Written by Al Jardine and Larry Dvoskin. That's Why God Made the Radio outtake with lead vocals by Carl Wilson. Completed by Al Jardine for the 2012 reissue of his solo album A Postcard from California (2010).
- "I'd Go Anywhere": Written by Brian Wilson and Joe Thomas. Song intended to bridge the tracks "Strange World" and "From There to Back Again". It was left unfinished.
- Alternate version of "She Believes in Love Again": Written by Bruce Johnston and recorded in 2012.

== Brian Wilson solo recordings ==
1960s

- "Everybody's Running Wild": Written by Roger Christian, Gary Usher, and Brian Wilson; recording date uncertain, circa 1963.

1970s

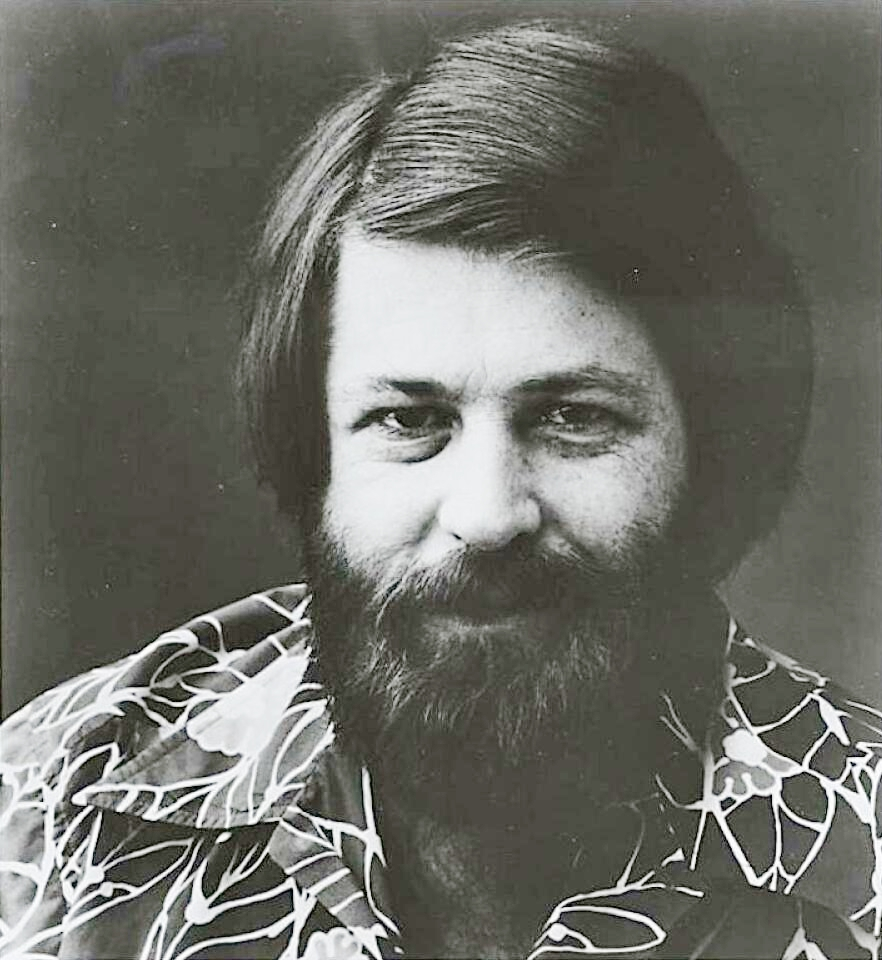
Brian Wilson in 1979

- "Symphony of Frogs": Unknown writer; recorded on June 1970 with production by Brian Wilson and intended for Stephen Kalinich.
- "Silly Walls": Written by Brian Wilson and David Sandler and recorded in November 1971. Intended for American Spring.
- "Funky Fever": Written by Brian Wilson and Sandler and recorded on February 28, 1972.
- "Grateful Are We for Little Children": Written by Brian Wilson and Stephen Kalinich; recorded in 1975. Evolved into "Saturday Morning in the City".
- "Come to the Sunshine": Written by Van Dyke Parks and recorded in October 1975. Intended for inclusion on the Beach Boys' next album (which became 15 Big Ones) but left off due to a dispute. As of 2004, the recording could not be located in the band's tape library.
- "Baby (I Could Be So Good at Lovin' You)": Written by Cliff Richard; recorded on November 16, 1977 during an American Spring session.

1983–1985

- "You (the First Time)": Written by Brian Wilson and Eugene Landy; recorded in late 1983.
- "Give Me Your Love": Written by Brian Wilson; recorded between 1985 and 1991.
- "A Bad Time Soon Forgotten": Written by Brian Wilson; recorded in August 1985.
- "I've Been Through This One Before": Written by Brian Wilson and Eugene Landy; recorded in August 1985.
- "Lost Song": Written by Brian Wilson and Eugene Landy; recorded in August 1985.
- "What's Wrong with Starting Over?": Written by Brian Wilson and Eugene Landy; recorded in August 1985.
- "Wondering What You're Up to Now": Written by Brian Wilson and Eugene Landy; recorded in August 1985.

1986

- "I Sleep Alone": Written by Brian Wilson and Eugene Landy; recorded in 1986.
- "Miller Time": Written by Brian Wilson and Eugene Landy; recorded in 1986.
- "Christine": Written by Brian Wilson; recorded on June 14, 1986. The song was reworked as "Living Doll" in 1987 and released under the Beach Boys name as a flexidisc packaged with the California Dream Barbie doll.
- "Heavenly Bodies": Written by Brian Wilson and Gary Usher; recorded between July 17 and August 18, 1986.
- "I'm Tired": Written by Brian Wilson; recorded between August 1 and 18, 1986.
- "The Spirit of Rock and Roll": Written by Brian Wilson, Gary Usher and Tom Kelly. Recorded on August 19 – December 11, 1986. In 2006, Brian recorded a new version of the song, which appeared on the Beach Boys' compilation album Songs from Here & Back.
- "I'm Broke": Written by Brian Wilson and Eugene Landy; recorded on June 2, 13, and 14 and September 17, 1986 (version 1); a second version was recorded on August 15, 1992 and appeared on the Brian Wilson: Long Promised Road soundtrack album.
- "A Little Love": Written by Brian Wilson and Gary Usher; recorded between August 25 and 30, 1986.
- "Magic": Written by Brian Wilson and Gary Usher; recorded between September 4 and 13 and October 8, 1986, with an additional session on January 29, 1987.
- "Christmas Time": Written by Brian Wilson; recorded on September 25, 1986.
- "All Over Me": Written by Brian Wilson and Gary Usher; recorded between September 29 and 30, 1986.
- "Black Widow": Written by Brian Wilson and Eugene Landy; recorded in late 1986.
- "Magnetic Attraction": Written by Brian Wilson, Gary Usher, and Tom Kelly; recorded between October 3 and 22, 1986. Kelly is not listed as co-writer in the publishing entry on ASCAP's website.
- "I've Got You Right Where You Want Me": Written by Brian Wilson; recorded on October 3, 1986.
- "Still I Dream of You": Written by Brian Wilson and Gary Usher; recorded on October 5, 1986.
- "Just Say No": Written by Brian Wilson; recorded between November 6 and 16, 1986.

1987–1988

- "Love Ya": Written by Brian Wilson, Todd Gold, Eugene Landy, and Alexandra Morgan; recorded in 1987.
- "Heavenly Lover": Written by Brian Wilson and Andy Paley; recorded in 1987–88.
- "Tiger's Eye": Written by Brian Wilson and Andy Paley; recorded in 1987–88.
- "Saturday Evening in the City": Written by Brian Wilson, Andy Paley, and Eugene Landy; recorded between May 22 and June 5, 1987 (version 1); a second version was recorded on August 27, 1994.
- "Carl & Gina": Written by Brian Wilson; recorded in late 1987.
- "Hotter": Written by Brian Wilson, Andy Paley, Eugene Landy, and Alexandra Morgan; recorded in late 1987.
- "Doin' Time on Planet Earth": Written by Brian Wilson and Eugene Landy; recorded in 1988. The song was recorded for the film of the same name, but was not used and later reworked into "Being With the One You Love".

1990–1991

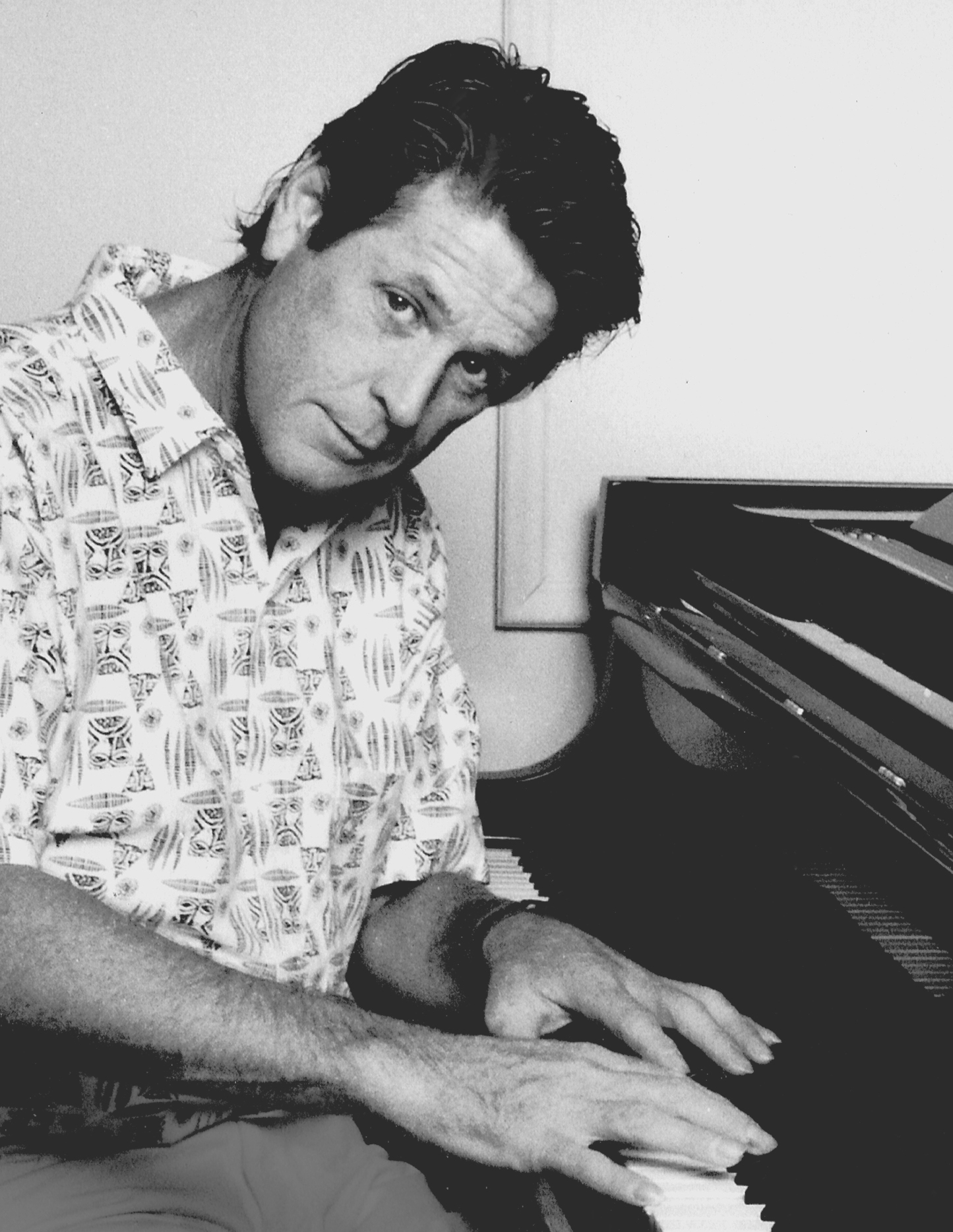
Wilson in 1990

- "Brian": Written by Brian Wilson and Eugene Landy; recorded in 1990–91.
- "Concert Tonite": Written by Brian Wilson and Eugene Landy; recorded in 1990–91.
- "Do You Have Any Regrets?": Written by Brian Wilson and Eugene Landy; recorded in 1990–91. A cover was later recorded by Darian Sahanaja.
- "Let's Stick Together": Written by Brian Wilson and Eugene Landy; recorded in 1990–91.
- Sweet Insanity version of "Make a Wish": Written by Brian Wilson and Eugene Landy; recorded in 1990–91. Wilson re-recorded the track for his 2004 album Gettin' In over My Head.
- "Save the Day": Written by Brian Wilson, David Foster, Eugene Landy, and Alexandra Morgan; recorded in 1990–91.
- "Smart Girls": Written by Brian Wilson and Eugene Landy; recorded in 1990–91.
- "Someone to Love": Written by Brian Wilson and Eugene Landy; recorded in 1990–91.

1992–1996

- "Proud Mary": Written by John Fogerty; recorded on April 6, May 29, September 4, and in December 1992 (version 1); a second version was recorded in December 1993.
- "God Did It": Written by Brian Wilson and Andy Paley; recorded on May 22, 1993, with lead vocal by Andy Paley.
- "Chain Reaction of Love": Written by Brian Wilson and Andy Paley; recorded in June 1993.
- "Right Before Your Eyes": Written by Brian Wilson and Peter Asher; recorded in 1993.
- "Rock and Roll Express": Written by Brian Wilson and Peter Asher; recorded in 1993.
- "Off My Chest": Written by Brian Wilson and Andy Paley; recorded in 1994.
- "Elbow 1963" (also known as "Elbow (1963)"): Written by Brian Wilson and Andy Paley; recorded on November 14, 1994, with lead vocal by Andy Paley.
- "Mary Anne": Written by Brian Wilson and Andy Paley; recorded on March 6, 1995.
- "Marketplace": Written by Brian Wilson and Andy Paley; recorded on March 10, 1995.
- "I'm Psyched": Written by Brian Wilson and Andy Paley; recorded on August 28, 1995.
- "In the Wink of an Eye": Written by Brian Wilson and Andy Paley; recorded in November 1995.
- "What Rock and Roll Can Do": Written by Brian Wilson and Andy Paley; recorded in November 1995.
- "Everything's Alright with the World": Written by Brian Wilson and Andy Paley; recorded in November 1995.
- "Frankie Avalon": Written by Brian Wilson and Andy Paley; recorded in November 1995.
- Alternate version of "Must Be a Miracle": Written by Brian Wilson and Andy Paley; recorded on November 7–8, 1995.
- "Case for a Song": Written by Brian Wilson and Peter Asher; recording date uncertain, circa 1996.
- "No Sad Story": Written by Brian Wilson, Peter Asher, Book, Paskowitz, and Perdichizzi; recording date uncertain, circa 1996.

2000s–2010s

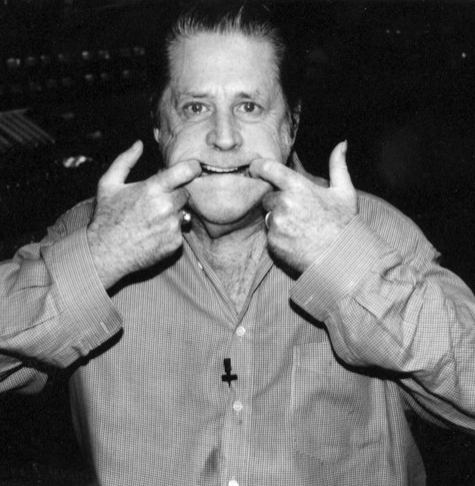
Wilson in 2005

- "Mr. Tambourine Man": Written by Bob Dylan; recorded in March 2007, produced by David Leaf.
- "Why Don't They Let Us Fall in Love?": Written by Phil Spector, Jeff Barry, and Ellie Greenwich; recorded in April 2007, with lead vocal by Jeff Foskett.
- "Chapel of Love": Written by Phil Spector, Jeff Barry, and Ellie Greenwich; recorded in February 2008, with lead vocal by Andy Paley.
- "Day Turns into Night": Attributed to Brian Wilson; recorded in February 2008.
- "Indian Lake": Written by Tony Romeo; recorded in February 2008, with lead vocal by Andy Paley.
- "Gimme Some Lovin'": Written by Spencer Davis, Muff Winwood, and Steve Winwood; recorded in April 2008, with lead vocal by Jeff Foskett.
- "Misty": Written by Erroll Garner; recorded in April 2008.
- "Downtown": Written by Tony Hatch; recorded in October 2008, with lead vocal by Gary Griffin.
- "Secretly": Attributed to Brian Wilson; recorded in September 2008.
- "You've Lost That Lovin' Feelin'": Written by Phil Spector, Jeff Barry, and Ellie Greenwich; recorded in March 2008, with lead vocal by Jeff Foskett.
- "Glow Worm": Attributed to Brian Wilson; recorded in January 2009.
- "Danny Boy": Traditional; recorded in 2013.
- "Metropolis": Written by Brian Wilson and Jeff Beck; recorded on September 5, 2013. The recording is an instrumental.
- "Special Love": Written by Brian Wilson and Joe Thomas; recorded in 2014.
- "Sharing a New Day": Written by Brian Wilson and Joe Thomas; recorded in 2014.

=== Brian Wilson productions ===
1962

- "Recreation": Written by Brian Wilson, Bob Norberg, and Cheryl Pomeroy and recorded on September 4, 1962. Non-Beach Boys production. The song was recorded at the same session as Rachel and the Revolvers' "The Revo-Lution" and "Number One", and the Bob & Sheri track "Humpty Dumpty".

1963

- "Hot Harp": Written by Brian Wilson and recorded on August 5, 1963. Brian produced the track for the Survivors, a group consisting of Bob Norberg and his friends Rich Alarian and Dave Nowlen. The recording is an instrumental. James B. Murphy suggests this track may feature Mike Love's sister Maureen on harp.
- "Wich Stand": Written by Brian Wilson and recorded on August 5, 1963. Brian produced the track for the Survivors. According to Murphy, the song was named after the drive-in restaurant of the same name. The recording has a lead vocal by Nowlen and background vocals by Brian, Norberg and Alarian. Capitol Records rejected the song for release as it sounded "too much like the Beach Boys".
- "Girlie": Written by Brian Wilson and recorded on August 5, 1963. Brian produced the track for the Survivors. Keith Badman claims the recording features Mike Love's sister Maureen on harp.
- "A Joyride Cruise": Written by Brian Wilson and recorded in August 1963. Brian produced the track for the Survivors. The recording was never completed.

1964

- "Boys Will Be Boys": Written by Brian Wilson and recorded in January 1964. Brian produced the track for the Honeys; no vocals were recorded.
- "What'll I Wear to School Today?": Written by Brian Wilson and Roger Christian and recorded in January 1964. Brian produced the song for the singer Sharon Marie. The group later reworked it as "All Dressed Up for School".

== Dennis Wilson solo recordings ==
1968−1969

- "Tale of Man": Written by Dennis Wilson and Stephen Kalinich and recorded in 1968.
- "Dennis' Piano Interlude": An untitled piano interlude written by Dennis Wilson and recorded on December 23, 1969. The recording is a demo related to "(Wouldn't It Be Nice to) Live Again".

1971−1975

- Alternate version of "Sea Cruise": Written by Huey "Piano" Smith; recorded in 1971.
- "Slow Song": Written by Dennis Wilson; recorded in 1972.
- "Baseball Tapes": Written by Dennis Wilson; recorded in 1974.
- "Miller Drive": Written by Dennis Wilson and Gerry Beckley; recorded in 1974.
- "Dennis' Symphony": Written by Dennis Wilson; recorded on February 22, 1974. The recording is an instrumental.
- "Don't Want Much, Just a Country or Two, Maybe a Planet Before It's Through": Written by Dennis Wilson and Stephen Kalinich; recorded in 1975.
- "Helen Keller": Written by Dennis Wilson and Stephen Kalinich; recorded in 1975.
- "Mabel Sittin' on a Kitchen Table": Written by Dennis Wilson and Stephen Kalinich; recorded in 1975.
- "Our Love Remains": Written by Dennis Wilson and Stephen Kalinich; recorded in 1975.
- "Writing Poems": Written by Dennis Wilson and Stephen Kalinich; recorded in 1975.
- "Slow Booze": Written by Dennis Wilson and Gregg Jakobson; recorded on February 12, 1975.

1976−1978

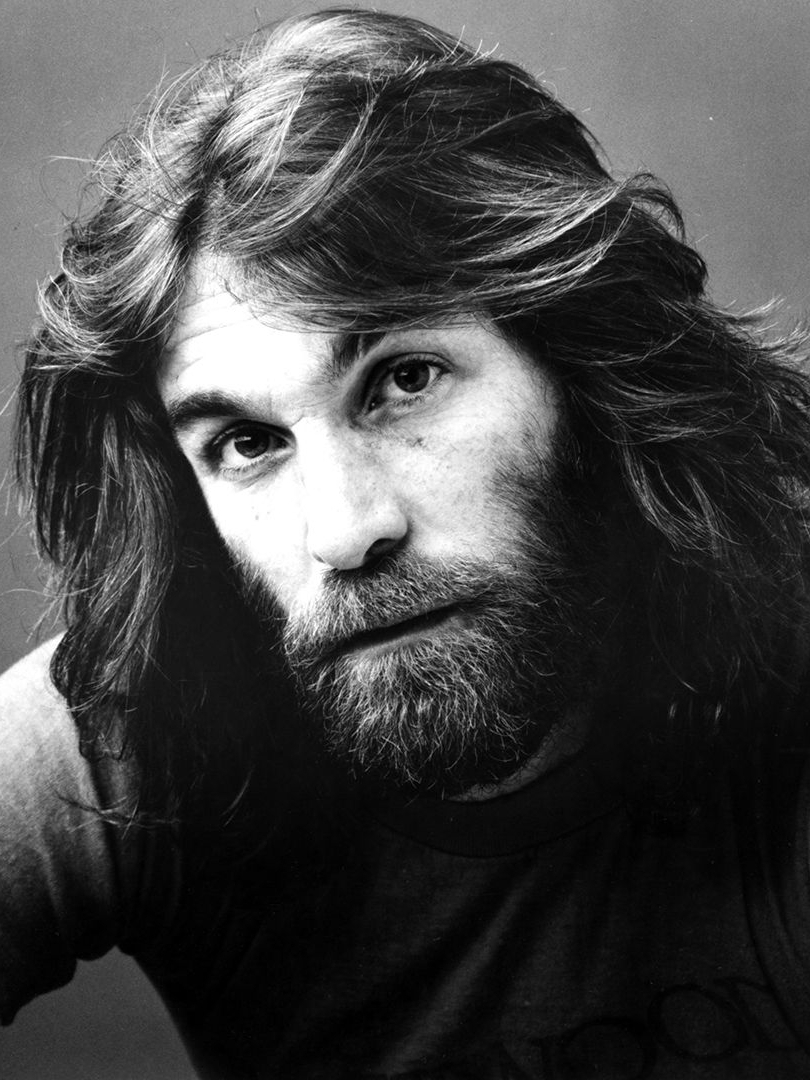
Dennis Wilson in 1977

- "Life Symphony": Written by Dennis Wilson and Stephen Kalinich; recorded in 1976.
- "Flowers Come in the Spring": Written by Dennis Wilson; recorded between September 1976 and spring 1977.
- "I Didn't Mean to Make You Worry": Written by Dennis Wilson; recorded between September 1976 and spring 1977.
- "Taking Off": Written by Dennis Wilson and Gregg Jakobson; recorded between September 1976 and spring 1977.
- "Crying": Written by Dennis Wilson; recorded in 1977.
- "Fever": Written by Dennis Wilson; recorded in 1977.
- "Here Comes the Sun": Written by George Harrison; a cover version recorded in 1977.
- "I Don't Know": Written by Dennis Wilson; recorded in 1977.
- "Oh Darling": Written by Dennis Wilson; recorded on May 12, 1977.
- "Something New": Written by Dennis Wilson; recorded on October 18, 1977.
- "Baby Blue Eyes": Written by Dennis Wilson, Gregg Jakobson, and Karen Lamm–Wilson; recorded in summer 1978.
- "I Gotta Get Out of Her Seat": Written by Dennis Wilson; recorded in July 1978.
- "La Plena de Amor": Written by Carli Muñoz; recorded in 1978.
- "Lord, Let Me Out of Here": Written by Dennis Wilson; recorded on July 15 and August 30, 1978.
- "Shu-Ru-Bop" (also known as "Shootabout"): Written by Carli Muñoz; recorded in 1978.

1980s

- "Labor Day": Written by Dennis Wilson; recorded on March 9, 1982, with lead vocal by Dennis.

== Al Jardine solo recordings ==
1970s−1980s

- "Poly Peptide": Written by Al Jardine; recording date uncertain, circa 1979.
- "Peace Is Breaking Out All Over": Written by Al Jardine and Shaeffer; recorded in fall 1988, produced by Scott Mathews.

1990s−2000s

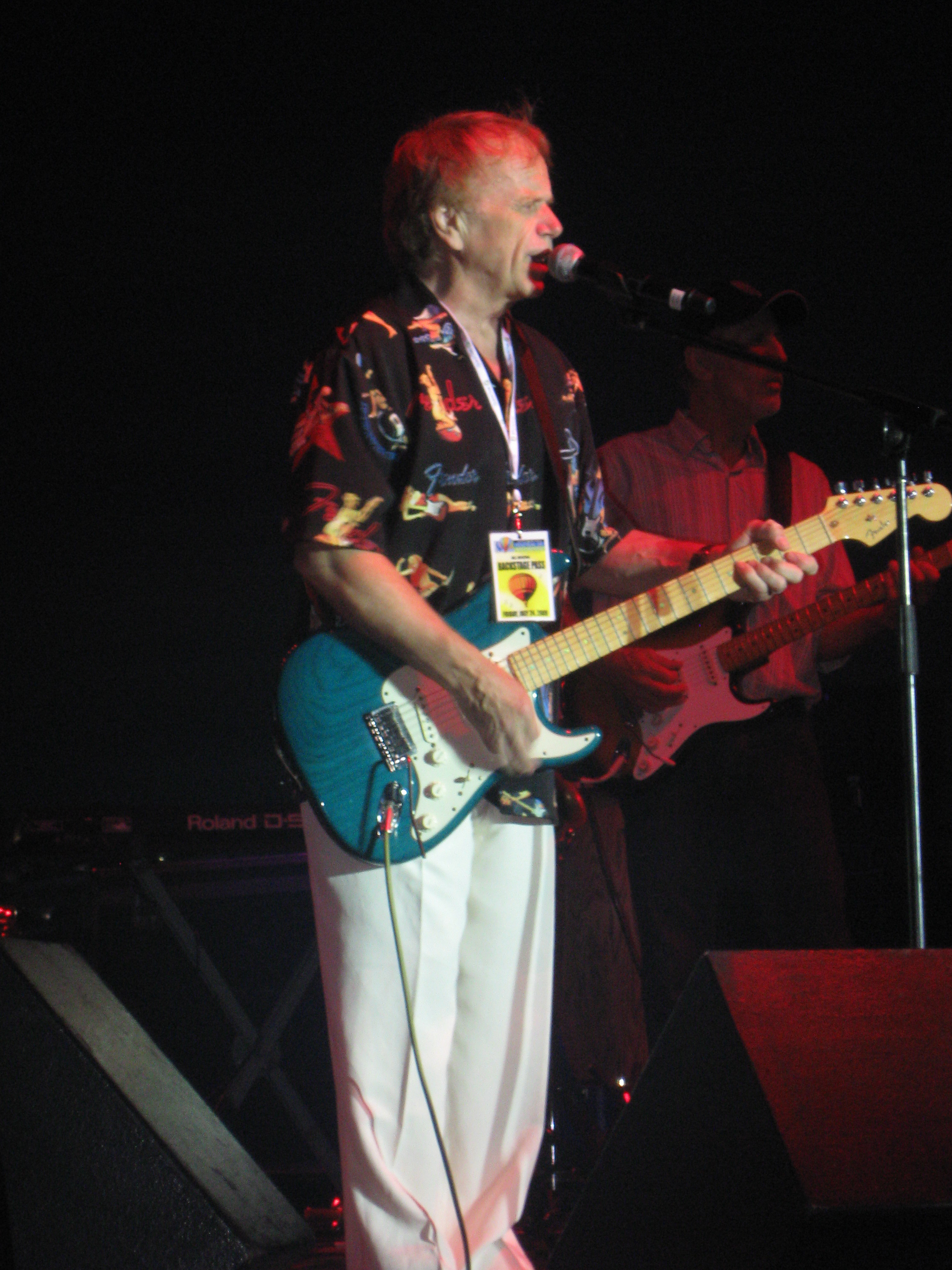
Al Jardine in 2009

- "Good Good Feelings": Written by Al Jardine and Larry Dvoskin; recorded in May–June 1994, with lead vocal by Matt Jardine.
- "A Pirate Looks at Fifty": Written by Jimmy Buffett and Al Jardine; recorded in spring–summer 1998.
- "Beauty Day": Written by Adam Jardine; recorded in spring–summer 1998.
- "Shooting Star": Written by Adam Jardine; recorded in spring–summer 1998.
- "Tell Me": Written by Adam Jardine; recorded in spring–summer 1998.
- "Wishing You Were Here": Unknown writer; recorded in spring–summer 2000.
- "Life's a Wave": Written by Al Jardine, Larry Dvoskin, and Brown; recorded in April 2009.

== Mike Love solo recordings ==
1976–1977

- "TM Siddhi Program": Written by Mike Love and recorded in November 1977.
- "Jailbait": Written by Mike Love; recorded in 1977.
- "Shooting Star": Written by Mike Love; recorded in 1977.
- "Chief Joseph": Attributed to Mike Love; recorded on November 21, 1977.

1978

- "Baby I'm a Changed Man": Written by Mike Love; recorded in October–November 1978.
- "Beth on the Mesa": Written by Mike Love; recorded in October–November 1978.
- "Brand New Start": Written by Mike Love; recorded in October–November 1978.
- "Dallas": Written by Mike Love; recorded in October–November 1978.
- "Daybreak": Written by Mike Love; recorded in October–November 1978. A later recording of the song appeared on the Beach Boys' album That's Why God Made the Radio as "Daybreak Over the Ocean".
- Alternate version of "Everyone's in Love with You": Written by Mike Love; recorded in October–November 1978.
- "Everything I Touch Turns into Tears": Written by Mike Love; recorded in October–November 1978.
- "First Love": Written by Paul Fauerso; recorded in October–November 1978.
- "Hey! Good Lookin'": Written by Hank Williams; a cover version recorded in October–November 1978.
- "I Don't Wanna Know": Written by Mike Love; recorded in October–November 1978.
- "Little Darlin'" (also known as "Tricia"): Written by Mike Love; recorded in October–November 1978. Love wrote the song as a tribute to his girlfriend who died from injuries sustained in a car accident. Carl Wilson performed backing vocals. The song is referred to as "Trisha" in Love's 2016 biography Good Vibrations: My Life as a Beach Boy.
- "Little Leela": Attributed to Mike Love; recorded in October–November 1978.
- "My Side of the Bed": Written by Mike Love and Peter Cetera; recorded in October–November 1978.
- "The Right Kind of Love": Written by Mike Love; recorded in October–November 1978.
- "Rock 'n' Roll Country Bride": Written by Mike Love; recorded in October–November 1978.
- "Some Sweet Day": Written by Mike Love; recorded in October–November 1978.
- "Today I Started Lovin' You Again": Written by Merle Haggard and Bonnie Owens; a cover version recorded in October–November 1978.
- "Too Cruel": Written by Mike Love; recorded in October–November 1978.
- "Viggie": Written by Mike Love; recorded in October–November 1978.
- "Wrinkles": Written by Mike Love; recorded in October–November 1978.
- "You're Looking Better": Written by Mike Love; recorded in October–November 1978.

1980s

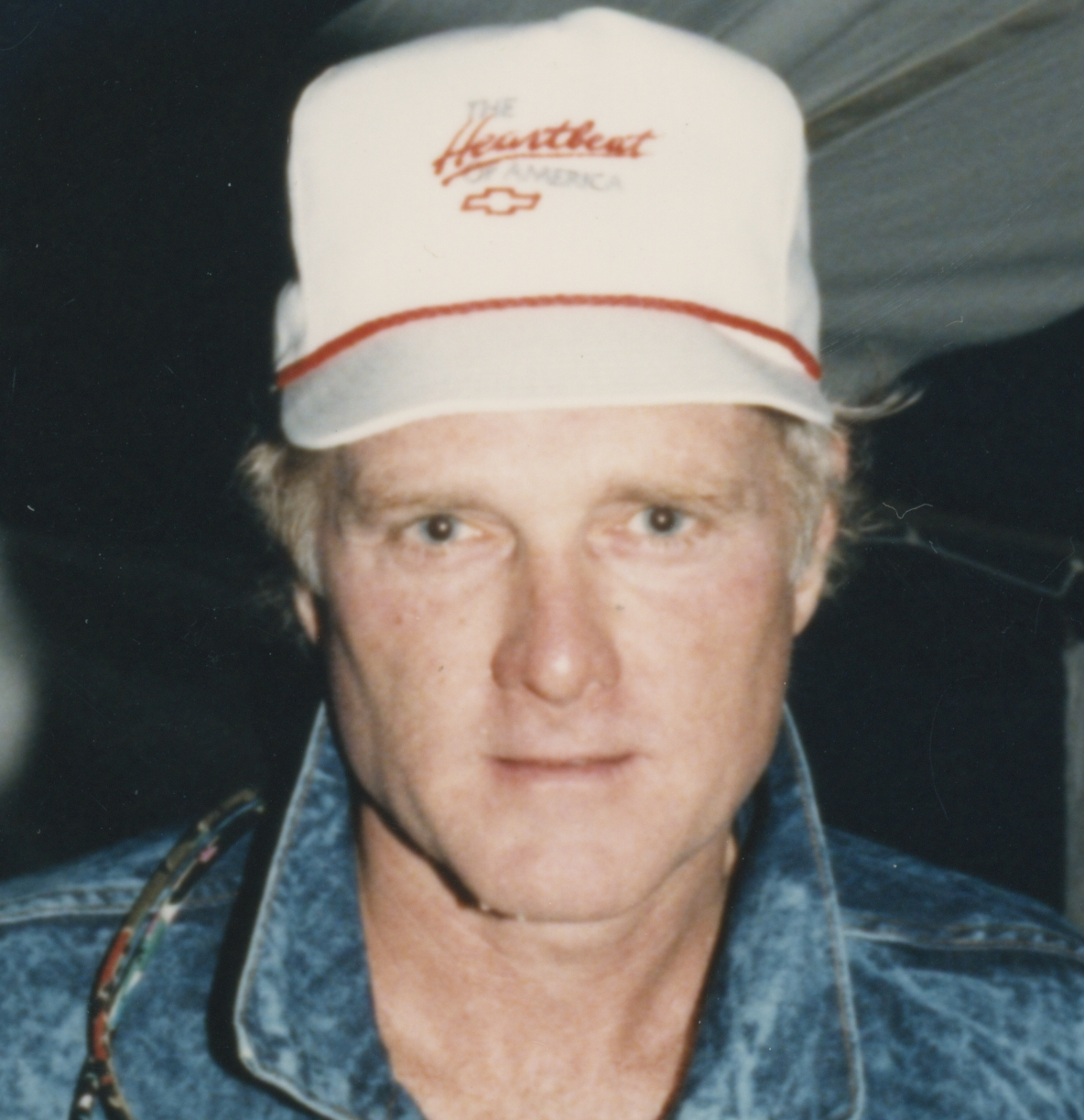
Mike Love in the late 1980s

- "Bucks": Written by Mike Love; recorded on May 3, 1980.
- "Children of the Night": Written by Mike Love; recorded in May 1980.
- "Oh, Those Girls": Written by David Andez and Pieter Sweval; recorded in 1981.
- "Rescue Me": Written by Raynard Miller and Carl Smith; recorded in the early 1980s.
- "American Girls": Written by Adrian Baker; recorded in February 1982.
- "Fun is Free": Unknown writer; recorded in January 1982.
- "Good Time Summertime Girls": Written by Adrian Baker; recorded in January 1982.
- "Sun City": Written by Adrian Baker; recorded in February 1982.
- "Hot Summer Lovers": Unknown writer; recorded in the early 1980s; no lead vocal was recorded.
- "Let's Dance": Written by Jim Lee; recorded in the early 1980s.
- "Dancing on a Saturday Night": Unknown writer; recorded in December 1983.
- "Summertime City": Written by Adrian Baker; recorded in December 1983.

1990s

- "Girls of the World": Written by Adrian Baker; recorded in 1991.
- "Cosmic Consciousness": Written by Paul Fauerso; recorded in 1991–93.
- "The Gift of Peace": Written by Paul Fauerso; recorded in 1991–93.
- "Lucky Number": Written by Paul Fauerso; recorded in 1991–93.
- "M.I.U. is Creating Heaven on Earth": Written by Paul Fauerso; recorded in 1991–93.
- "T.M. Center": Written by Mike Love; recorded in 1991–93.
- "We Need Support": Written by Paul Fauerso; recorded in 1991–93.
- "The World is My Family": Written by Paul Fauerso and Mike Love; recorded in 1991–93.

2000s−2010s

- "Anything for You": Written by Mike Love; recording date uncertain, mid-2000s.
- "Big Sur": Written by Mike Love; recorded in 2015–16.

== Bibliography ==
- Badman, Keith (2004). The Beach Boys: The Definitive Diary of America's Greatest Band, on Stage and in the Studio. Backbeat Books. ISBN 978-0-87930-818-6.
- Lambert, Philip (2007). Inside the Music of Brian Wilson: The Songs, Sounds, and Influences of the Beach Boys' Founding Genius. Bloomsbury Publishing. ISBN 978-1-4411-0748-0.
- Leaf, David (1978). The Beach Boys and the California Myth. Grosset & Dunlap. ISBN 978-0-448-14626-3.
- Murphy, James B. (2015). Becoming the Beach Boys, 1961-1963. McFarland & Company, Inc. ISBN 978-0-7864-7365-6.
- Priore, Domenic (2005). Smile: The Story of Brian Wilson's Lost Masterpiece. London: Sanctuary. ISBN 1860746276.
