= Merry Christmas from the Beach Boys =

Unreleased studio album by the Beach Boys

Studio album (unreleased) by The Beach Boys
- Recorded: 1970–1977
- Genre: Christmas
- Length: 33:38
- Producers: Brian Wilson, Al Jardine, Ron Altbach, Dennis Wilson, Terry Jacks

The Beach Boys recording chronology
Adult/Child (1977)	Merry Christmas from the Beach Boys (1977)	M.I.U. Album (1978)

Merry Christmas from the Beach Boys is an unreleased studio album by American rock band the Beach Boys. Planned for issue in November/December 1978, the content was a mixture of original songs penned by the group and traditional standards, similar to their 1964 release The Beach Boys' Christmas Album.

The album was produced by Brian Wilson during the same sessions as M.I.U. Album (1978), but ultimately rejected by Warner Bros. Records who were reportedly "highly skeptical" that Wilson was anywhere on it. Some of its recordings were later released on the 1998 compilation Ultimate Christmas.

== Recording ==
Merry Christmas from the Beach Boys was mostly recorded between November and December 1977 at the Maharishi International University in Iowa. Exceptions are "Seasons in the Sun", "Santa's On His Way", "Michael Rowed the Boat Ashore", "Child of Winter (Christmas Song)" and "Christmas Time Is Here Again", all of which were variously recorded between 1970 and 1976. Other songs worked on during these sessions were alternate versions of tracks included on M.I.U. Album. These include that album's "Belles of Paris" ("Bells of Christmas") and "Kona Coast" ("Melekalikimaka" or "Kona Christmas").

== Track listing ==
Track sequencing adapted from Andrew Doe.

Side one
No.	Title	Writer(s)	Producer(s)	Length
1.	"Christmas Time Is Here Again"	Buddy Holly, Norman Petty, Jerry Allison, Al Jardine	Brian Wilson	3:05
2.	"Child of Winter (Christmas Song)"	Brian Wilson, Stephen Kalinich	B. Wilson	2:51
3.	"Winter Symphony"	B. Wilson	B. Wilson	3:02
4.	"Michael Row the Boat Ashore"	traditional	B. Wilson	3:40
5.	"Seasons in the Sun"	Jacques Brel, Rod McKuen	Terry Jacks	3:21
6.	"Morning Christmas"	Dennis Wilson	Dennis Wilson	3:26

Side two
No.	Title	Writer(s)	Producer(s)	Length
1.	"Alone on Christmas Day"	Love, Ron Altbach	Al Jardine and Ron Altbach	2:52
2.	"Go and Get That Girl"	Ed Tuleja, Ron Altbach	Jardine and Altbach	3:15
3.	"Santa's On His Way"	B. Wilson, Jardine, Love	B. Wilson	3:25
4.	"I Saw Mommy Kissing Santa Claus"	Tommie Connor	B. Wilson	2:24
5.	"Xmas Carol Medley": "God Rest Ye Merry Gentlemen"; "O Come All Ye Faithful"; "Hark the Herald Angels Sing"; "We Wish You a Merry Christmas"		Jardine and Altbach	2:26

== Personnel ==
Credits sourced from Craig Slowinski, John Brode, Will Crerar, Joshilyn Hoisington, David Beard and Brad Elliott. This list does not include complete personnel credits for "Michael Row the Boat Ashore".

The Beach Boys

- Al Jardine - lead (1, 11) and backing vocals (1, 3–5, 7, 9–11), banjo (9), piano (10?)
- Mike Love - lead (2, 4, 7, 9, 11) and backing vocals (1, 4, 5, 7–11)
- Brian Wilson - lead (2, 3, 11) and backing vocals (1–4, 7, 9–11), piano (3, 10?), Hammond organ (9), electric harpsichord (1), keyboards (2), bass guitar (9), bass drum (9), tambourine (9), tubular bells (2), handclaps (9)
- Carl Wilson - lead (5, 8, 11) and backing vocals (1, 2, 4, 5, 9–11), electric guitar (2, 9)
- Dennis Wilson - lead (6) and backing vocals (2, 6), piano (6), celeste (6), Hammond organ (6), Minimoog (6), bass harmonica (6), drums (1, 2, 6), tubular bells (6)

Touring Band

- Michael Andreas - saxophone (7, 8, 11), flute (3)
- Ron Altbach - backing vocals (7, 8), piano (7, 8), electric piano (3), trombone (3, 7, 8, 11)
- Lance Buller - trumpet (3, 7, 8, 11)
- Ed Carter - 12-string electric guitar (8), electric guitar (8), bass guitar (7, 8)
- Gary Griffin - ARP Omni (3)
- John Foss - trumpet (3, 7, 8, 11), piccolo trumpet (3)
- Rusty Ford - bass guitar (3)
- Mike Kowalski - drums (3), congas (3), cabasa (7), tubular bells (7), tambourine (8)
- Bobby Figueroa - drums (7, 8)
- Charlie McCarthy - flutes (3), saxophone (7, 8, 11)
- Rod Novak - saxophone (7, 8)

Guests

- Marilyn Rovell, Diane Rovell - lead vocals (11)
- Carnie Wilson, Wendy Wilson - lead vocals (10, 11), sleigh bells (2)
- Jonah Wilson, Justyn Wilson, Hayleigh Love, Christian Love, Matt Jardine, Adam Jardine - lead vocals (10, 11)
- Gary Puckett - backing vocals (7, 8), acoustic guitar (7, 8)
- Bruce Johnston - backing vocals (5)
- Daryl Dragon - tack piano (9)
- Terry Jacks - Hammond organ (5), Rocksichord (5)
- Marisa Conover, Susan Murphy, Baron Stewart - backing vocals (6)
- Stephen Kalinich - kazoo (2)

Additional Musicians

- Jay Graydon - electric guitars (1)
- Frank Marocco - accordion (1)
- Ray Pohlman - bass guitar (1)
- Julius Wechter - sleigh bells (1), vibraphone (1)
- Steve Douglas - tenor saxophones (1)
- Jay Migliori - baritone saxophones (1)
- Mike Deasy - electric guitars (5)
- Lyle Ritz - bass guitar (5)
- Earl Palmer - drums (5)
- Virgil Evans - trumpets (5)
- Ed Tuleja - electric guitar (7, 8)
- unknown - lead vocals (11), flutes (6), clarinets (6), bass clarinets (6), French horn (3)

== See also ==
- M.I.U. Album
- Ultimate Christmas
- The Beach Boys bootleg recordings
- List of unreleased songs recorded by the Beach Boys
