= Bells of Christmas =

Bells of Christmas

- Bells of Christmas, album by BZN 1989
- "Bells of Christmas", The Beach Boys M.I.U. Album
