= A Very Murray Christmas =

2015 film directed by Sofia Coppola

- Release poster
- Written by: Sofia Coppola; Mitch Glazer; Bill Murray
- Directed by: Sofia Coppola
- Starring: Bill Murray
- Music by: Paul Shaffer; (musical director)
- Country of origin: United States
- Original language: English

Production
- Producers: Lilly Burns; John Skidmore
- Cinematography: John Tanzer
- Editor: Sarah Flack
- Running time: 56 minutes
- Production company: American Zoetrope

Original release
- Network: Netflix
- Release: December 4, 2015

A Very Murray Christmas is a 2015 American Christmas musical comedy film directed by Sofia Coppola and co-written by Bill Murray, Mitch Glazer, and Coppola. The film features an ensemble cast including Murray, George Clooney, Paul Shaffer, Amy Poehler, Julie White, Dimitri Dimitrov, Michael Cera, Chris Rock, David Johansen, Maya Rudolph, Jason Schwartzman, Jenny Lewis, Rashida Jones, and Miley Cyrus and was released on December 4, 2015, on Netflix.

== Plot ==
On Christmas Eve, Bill Murray waits in his suite at the Carlyle Hotel, gradually realizing that a massive snowstorm has caused most of the guests for his live Christmas special to cancel. As time runs out, his two producers, Liz (Amy Poehler), and Bev (Julie White), coerce him into going on with the show, as he is financially on the hook if he cancels. With minimal crew, Murray goes live; but in the middle of singing a song, he begins to weep and then flees the studio. While trying to leave the hotel, he sees Chris Rock, whom he forces into performing "Do You Hear What I Hear?" with him. During a power outage, Rock flees, and the producers inform Murray that as the power outage is considered an Act of God, the special can now be cancelled.

Filled with relief, Murray goes to the Carlyle bar, where he sings a song with an anonymous waitress (Jenny Lewis). After they hear the chefs shouting, they go to investigate, and realize that the French chefs (Phoenix) are overwhelmed, as the fridges have stopped working and the food is about to go bad. Murray encourages them to bring the food to the bar, so that the few patrons can eat it all. On his way back to the bar, he passes a weeping bride (Rashida Jones), who informs him that her wedding was called off due to the cold, and who is also upset because she has fought with her fiancé, Elliot (Jason Schwartzman).

The French chefs sing "Alone on Christmas Day", followed by the lounge singer (Maya Rudolph) performing "Christmas (Baby Please Come Home)". Afterwards, the bride comes out wheeling a cake, and asks Murray about his theory of love. He asks Elliot and the bride to look at one another and think of the exact instant they knew they were in love with each other. The couple sing "I Saw the Light", and become re-engaged. At 12:01 am the remaining guests at the hotel wish each other a merry Christmas, and then sing "Fairytale of New York" together. At the end of the song, Murray, who had been drinking heavily, passes out.

While unconscious, Murray dreams that he awakens on a beautiful set in the middle of his Christmas special. In his dream, he is joined by George Clooney and Miley Cyrus. As Clooney prepares martinis, Cyrus and Murray sing "Sleigh Ride" together. After a few more musical numbers between himself, Cyrus, and Clooney (most notably, a version of Albert King's "Santa Claus Needs Some Loving"), Murray reawakens in his suite at the Carlyle, where he realizes it is still Christmas.

== Cast ==
- Bill Murray as himself
- Michael Cera as Jackie the Talent Agent
- George Clooney as himself
- Miley Cyrus as herself
- Dimitri Dimitrov as himself
- David Johansen as the Bartender
- Jenny Lewis as The Waitress
- Rashida Jones as The Bride
- Amy Poehler as Liz
- Chris Rock as himself
- Maya Rudolph as Lounge Singer
- Jason Schwartzman as Elliott
- Paul Shaffer as himself
- Julie White as Bev
- Phoenix as The Chefs

== Songs ==
- "The Christmas Blues" – Bill Murray
- "Let It Snow, Let It Snow, Let It Snow" – Murray, Amy Poehler and Julie White
- "Jingle Bells" – Murray
- "Do You Hear What I Hear?" – Murray and Chris Rock
- "Baby, It's Cold Outside" – Jenny Lewis and Murray
- "The Twelve Days of Christmas" – Dmitri Dimitrov
- "O Tannenbaum" – David Johansen
- "Good King Wenceslas" – Lewis
- "Alone on Christmas Day" – Phoenix, Jason Schwartzman, Murray, and Johansen
- "Christmas (Baby Please Come Home)" – Maya Rudolph
- "I Saw the Light" – Schwartzman, Rashida Jones, Rudolph, Johansen, and Murray
- "Fairytale of New York" – The cast
- "Sleigh Ride" – Murray and Miley Cyrus
- "Silent Night" – Cyrus
- "Santa Claus Wants Some Lovin'" – Murray and George Clooney
- "Let It Snow, Let It Snow, Let It Snow" (reprise) – Murray, Cyrus and Clooney
- "We Wish You a Merry Christmas" – Murray

== Production ==
In October 2014, the film was announced as a Christmas special with Bill Murray to star and Sofia Coppola set to write and direct.

In May 2015, the film was picked up by Netflix and was announced as a homage to classic variety shows and would be written by Murray, Mitch Glazer, and Coppola, and directed by Coppola. It was executive produced by Coppola, Glazer, Roman Coppola, and Tony Hernandez with Shaffer as the special's musical director and onscreen accompanist.

The film is set at the Carlyle Hotel and its Bemelmans Bar.

Initially, rapper Rick Ross was scheduled to sing "Santa Claus Wants Some Lovin'" with Murray, but when Ross became unavailable, George Clooney filled in. Also, Cyrus' acoustic version of "Silent Night" was a last-minute addition.

== Reception ==
The special received positive reviews from critics. On review aggregator website Rotten Tomatoes, the film has a 68% rating based on 50 reviews, with an average rating of 6.3/10. The site's consensus states: "A Very Murray Christmas preaches effectively to the converted with a parade of superstar guests and hummable songs that - combined with the host's trademark presence - adds up to a unique holiday experience." Metacritic reports a 68 out of 100 rating based on 18 critics, indicating "generally favorable" reviews.

=== Accolades ===
Award	Date of ceremony	Category	Recipient(s)	Result	Ref.
Directors Guild of America Awards	February 6, 2016	Outstanding Directing – Variety Specials	Sofia Coppola	Nominated	
Primetime Emmy Awards	September 18, 2016	Outstanding Television Movie	A Very Murray Christmas	Nominated	
Primetime Creative Arts Emmy Awards	September 10–11, 2016	Outstanding Music Direction	Paul Shaffer	Nominated	
Producers Guild of America Awards	January 23, 2016	Outstanding Producer of Long-Form Television	Sofia Coppola, Roman Coppola, Mitch Glazer, Tony Hernandez, Bill Murray, Michael Zakin	Nominated	
Screen Actors Guild Awards	January 30, 2016	Outstanding Performance by a Male Actor in a Miniseries or Television Movie	Bill Murray	Nominated	

== See also ==
- List of Christmas films
