= Mayham =

- The Sopranos episode
- Episode no.: Season 6 Episode 3
- Directed by: Jack Bender
- Written by: Matthew Weiner
- Cinematography by: Phil Abraham
- Production code: 603
- Original air date: March 26, 2006
- Running time: 56 minutes

Guest appearance
- Steve Buscemi as Man

Episode chronology
← Previous "Join the Club"	Next → "The Fleshy Part of the Thigh"
- The Sopranos season 6

"Mayham" is the 68th episode of the HBO original series The Sopranos and the third of the show's sixth season. Written by Matthew Weiner and directed by Jack Bender, it originally aired on March 26, 2006.

== Starring ==
- James Gandolfini as Tony Soprano / Kevin Finnerty
- Lorraine Bracco as Dr. Jennifer Melfi
- Edie Falco as Carmela Soprano
- Michael Imperioli as Christopher Moltisanti
- Dominic Chianese as Corrado Soprano, Jr. *
- Steven Van Zandt as Silvio Dante
- Tony Sirico as Paulie Gualtieri
- Robert Iler as Anthony Soprano, Jr.
- Jamie-Lynn Sigler as Meadow Soprano
- Aida Turturro as Janice Soprano Baccalieri
- Steven R. Schirripa as Bobby Baccalieri
- Frank Vincent as Phil Leotardo
- John Ventimiglia as Artie Bucco
- Ray Abruzzo as Little Carmine Lupertazzi
- Joseph R. Gannascoli as Vito Spatafore
- Dan Grimaldi as Patsy Parisi

* = credit only

=== Guest starring ===
- Tom Aldredge as Hugh De Angelis
- Sharon Angela as Rosalie Aprile
- Elizabeth Bracco as Marie Spatafore
- Steve Buscemi as Man
- Carl Capotorto as Little Paulie Germani
- Max Casella as Benny Fazio
- Timothy Daly as J.T. Dolan
- Tony Darrow as Larry Boy Barese
- Will Janowitz as Finn DeTrolio
- Bill Kurtis as himself
- James Vincent Romano as Cary DiBartolo
- Suzanne Shepherd as Mary De Angelis
- Paul Schulze as Father Phil Intintola
- Maureen Van Zandt as Gabriella Dante
- Ed Vassalo as Tom Giglione
- Danielle Di Vecchio as Barbara Soprano Giglione
- Lenny Venito as James "Murmur" Zancone
- Geraldine LiBrandi as Patty Leotardo
- Henry O as Monk #1
- Ho Chow as Monk #2
- Simon Sinn as Monk #3
- Luis Ruiz as Superintendent
- Angel Fajardo as Colombian #1
- Chris Colombo as Colombian #2
- Wendy Hammers as Fake Carmela (voice)
- Ron Leibman as Dr. Lior Plepler
- William DeMeo as Jason Molinaro
- Edward Watts as Bartender
- C. S. Lee as Dr. Ba
- Matthew Stocke as EMT
- Anjali Bhimani as Dr. Budraja
- David Francis Calderazzo as Nick Spangnelli

== Synopsis ==
Paulie and a member of his crew burglarize an apartment belonging to Colombian drug dealers in Newark. The apartment is not empty as expected and a firefight ensues, leading to the deaths of the building superintendent and two of the drug dealers. There is a huge score, but it contributes to rising tensions within the Soprano family: Silvio, now acting boss, makes rulings on how the money, and Eugene's former Roseville bookmaking revenue, should be split. None of the parties involved like his decisions. A reluctant boss, Silvio is later hospitalized after an asthma attack. In case Tony does not recover, Paulie and Vito delay paying the cut they owe to Carmela.

Vito quietly starts a campaign to position himself as a potential new leader, maintaining a cordial relationship with the Lupertazzi acting boss Phil Leotardo, who is a second cousin of Vito's wife Marie. He happens to be in the hospital when Meadow's fiancé Finn DeTrolio turns up, making a threatening pass at him.

Christopher and Bobby confront A.J. when he attempts to buy a gun, intending to take revenge on Junior. Carmela sees a news report about Tony being shot, in which A.J. remarks that it is weird growing up in their family. She yells at her son, cruelly telling him he is a "cross to bear", causing A.J. to storm out in anger and hurt, Hugh scolding her, and Carmela then sobs in her room. The next day, Carmela tells Dr. Melfi that while she knew what Tony was when she married him, their kids "don't decide who they're born to."

Chris' passion for the movie industry is reborn. He has Benny Fazio and Murmur rough up screenwriter J.T. Dolan, and orders him to write a script for a slasher mob film he wants to produce. Chris later arranges a meeting with potential investors, the chief adviser and partner being Little Carmine. J.T. comes up with the title, Cleaver, and explains the premise to the investors, including Silvio, Vito and Larry Boy Barese, but they seem confused about its plot. Nevertheless, Chris assures them the film is a guaranteed success.

Although only family members are allowed to see Tony, Silvio and Paulie are smuggled in by Carmela and Meadow. Alone with Tony, Paulie treats his unconscious boss to a tedious and discontented monologue about his current life. Tony's heart rate escalates steadily, but Paulie does not notice it until he goes into cardiac arrest. Hospital staff rush in.

Tony's dream sequence from the previous episode has continued.

At his hotel room, Tony receives a summons from the Buddhist monks addressed to Kevin Finnerty, and he begins to question his identity. He seeks answers from the bartender and the monks but finds none. Tony is disturbed by muffled sounds from an adjoining room at his hotel (originating from Paulie in the hospital) and bangs angrily on the wall for quiet. Having found a flier for the Finnerty family reunion in his briefcase, he is greeted outside the venue by a man who looks like his cousin Tony Blundetto. The man tries to get Tony to enter the light-festooned house, assuring him that "everyone's here" and that he is "coming home"; but he also tells Tony that he must first let go of his "business" and hand over his briefcase. Tony hesitates, saying that he has lost his real briefcase, which contained "his whole life inside". A figure resembling Livia stands by the doorway. A voice calls out from the woods behind Tony, pleading, "don't go, Daddy" (originating from Meadow in the hospital). As Tony approaches the house, he is enveloped by white light.

Tony awakes in the hospital, asking, "I'm dead, right?" Later, heavily sedated and still hardly able to talk, Tony listens to an excited Christopher explaining his movie venture to him; he says he left a position for Tony to become a major investor. Christopher then notices an Ojibwe saying taped onto the wall: "Sometimes I go about in pity for myself, and all the while, a great wind carries me across the sky." With Tony now conscious, Paulie and Vito anxiously rush to get their cuts to Carmela. They hand over the cash and she is grateful, but as they are leaving in the elevator, she turns around and sees them looking sour.

== First appearances ==
- Marie Spatafore: Vito Spatafore's wife
- Patty Leotardo: Phil Leotardo's wife

== Deceased ==
- Building Superintendent: inadvertently shot by Colombian #1
- Colombian #1: shot by Cary DiBartolo and Paulie
- Colombian #2: shot by Cary DiBartolo and then stabbed by Paulie

== Production ==
- Ray Abruzzo (Little Carmine) is now promoted to the main cast and billed in the opening credits but only in the episodes in which he appears.
- Lorraine Bracco's sister Elizabeth joins the show playing the character of Marie, the wife of Vito Spatafore.
- Steve Buscemi, whose character Tony B was killed off in season 5, played a different, unnamed character in Tony Soprano's dream.

== Music ==
- In the first scene, as Paulie is parked, "Smoky Places" by The Corsairs is playing.
- "Donde Estan Las Gatas" by Daddy Yankee and Nicky Jam is playing in the Colombians' office when Paulie enters.
- An acoustic version of Heart's "These Dreams" plays in the supermarket when Carmela and Dr. Melfi run into each other.
- Sheryl Crow's rendition of "The First Cut Is the Deepest" is playing on Tony's stereo during his coma.
- "Oh! What It Seemed To Be" by Frank Sinatra is playing on the stereo while Carmela talks to the nurse and Meadow is asleep on the chair.
- The mariachi music played in the country house when Tony Blundetto is welcoming Tony Soprano is "La Feria de las Flores" by Mariachi Vargas de Tecalitlán.
- "When You Dance" by The Turbans is playing in the last scene while Christopher is talking to Tony in his hospital room.
- A rendition by The Mystics of "Somewhere Over the Rainbow" is being played while Carmela is wetting Tony's lips.
- The instrumental piece played over the end credits is "The Deadly Nightshade" by Daniel Lanois.
- Series creator David Chase has stated that he originally wished to end the episode with the Beatles song "I'll Follow the Sun", but decided against it due to high licensing fees.

== Reception ==
On its premiere, "Mayham" had nearly 8.93 million viewers, with a 4.1 Nielsen rating and 9 share among adults 18 to 49. This episode marked two straight weeks of declining viewership for season six.

Television Without Pity graded "Mayham" with an A. Lisa Schwarzbaum of Entertainment Weekly praised the "story pacing" and "great comic subplots". For The Star-Ledger, Alan Sepinwall found some comedic moments otherwise rare for the show: Silvio in the restroom and Tony dreaming about hearing Paulie's rants from another hotel room. TV Squad found "a little more action" in contrast to previous episode "Join the Club".
