= Reason for the Season =

Studio album by Mike Love
- Released: October 26, 2018
- Genre: Christmas, pop rock
- Length: 38:19
- Label: BMG
- Producer: Michael Lloyd, Scott Totten

Mike Love chronology
Unleash the Love (2017)	Reason for the Season (2018)	12 Sides of Summer (2019)

Reason for the Season is the third solo studio album by American musician Mike Love, co-founder of The Beach Boys. It was released on October 26, 2018. The album contains traditional Christmas carols, new songs, and re-recordings of "Little St. Nick" (from The Beach Boys' Christmas Album) and "Alone on Christmas Day", an unreleased song recorded by The Beach Boys in 1977. The album was released on compact disc and clear vinyl with red and green splatter.

The album was primarily recorded in Love's home studio on Lake Tahoe in the Sierra Nevada Mountains. It features Love's children — Ambha, Brian, Christian and Hayleigh — who provide choral voices on five tracks, and his sister Maureen as the harpist on "O Holy Night". It also features a guest appearance by Hanson on "Finally It's Christmas", the title track to their 2017 Christmas album. Earlier in 2018, Love collaborated with Hanson on a re-recording of The Beach Boys' "It's OK". Hanson also recorded "Little St. Nick" for their 1997 Christmas album, Snowed In.

The cover photo of the Aurora Borealis was taken by Brian Love off an island in Norway. The back cover features a photo of Mike Love as a child playing with Lionel Trains under a Christmas tree.

Love released music videos for the title track and "Finally It's Christmas".

The album reached #4 on Billboard's Holiday Album Chart and #6 on the Independent Albums Chart. Kevin Coffey of the Omaha World-Herald included it in his list of the best new Christmas music of 2018.

Love and Bruce Johnston’s Beach Boys touring band performed tracks from this album during their 2018, 2019, 2021 & 2022 holiday tours.

== Track listing ==
No.	Title	Writer(s)	Length
1.	"Celestial Celebration"	Grant Michaels; Mike Love; Sam Hollander	2:38
2.	"Finally, It's Christmas" (featuring Hanson)	Isaac Hanson; Zac Hanson; Taylor Hanson	3:34
3.	"Little St. Nick"	Love; Brian Wilson	2:09
4.	"Must Be Christmas" (with Ambha Love & Christian Love)	Hollander; Kevin Griffin	3:39
5.	"Jingle Bell Rock"	James Boothe; Joseph Beal	2:18
6.	"Alone on Christmas Day"	Love; Ron Altbach	4:05
7.	"Reason for the Season"	Hollander; Love; Michaels	3:08
8.	"Do You Hear What I Hear" (with All Love)	Noël Regney; Gloria Shayne Baker	3:37
9.	"Away in a Manger" (with All Love)	Traditional	2:33
10.	"Bring a Torch" (feat. Hayleigh Love & Brian Love)	Public Domain	3:04
11.	"O Come All Ye Faithful" (with All Love)	Traditional	3:19
12.	"O Holy Night" (with All Love)	Traditional	4:15

== Personnel ==
- Mike Love – vocals
- Bruce Johnston – backing vocals
- Scott Totten – guitar, percussion, backing vocals, producer
- Jeffrey Foskett – rhythm guitar, vocals
- John Cowsill – drums
- Brian Eichenberger – bass guitar, backing vocals
- Tim Bonhomme – keyboards, piano
- Randy Leago – saxophone, flute
- Keith Hubacher – bass guitar
- Pete Min – 12-string guitar
- Jebin Bruni – keyboards
- Maureen Love – harp
- Kaveh Rastegar – drums
- Michael Lloyd – bass guitar, drums, guitar, harp, backing vocals, producer
- Abe Rounds – drums
- Josh Edmondson – guitar
- Christian Love – lead and backing vocals
- Brian Love – lead and backing vocals
- Hayleigh Love – lead and backing vocals
- Ambha Love – lead and backing vocals
- Hanson – backing vocals on "Finally It's Christmas"
- Matthew Jordan – arrangements, backing vocals, keyboards
