= The Corsairs =

American doo wop ensemble

The Corsairs were an American doo wop ensemble from La Grange, North Carolina.

The group consisted of the three Uzzell brothers, Moses, Jay, James and their cousin, George Wooten. Initially they performed as The Gleems, and toured the East Coast, where they were overheard by Abner Spector. Changing their name in 1961 to The Corsairs, they released their first single, "Time Waits" b/w "It Won't Be a Sin" on Smash Records. Switching to Tuff Records they released "Smoky Places", which became a nationwide hit after being picked up for national distribution by Chess Records, hitting number 10 R&B and number 12 on the Billboard Hot 100 in 1962. The follow-up, "I'll Take You Home", peaked at number 62, and they continued releasing singles until 1964, none of which managed to hit the charts.

"Smoky Places" was used in the 1994 movie, There Goes My Baby, and in the 2006 Sopranos episode "Mayham."

Jay Uzzell (born Jay Dee Uzzell) died on February 1, 2009.

Moses Uzzell Sr. (born Moses Linberg Uzzell) died on May 11, 2013, at age 80.

James Uzzell (born Deacon James Lee Uzzell on December 1, 1937 in Lenoir County, North Carolina) died on September 10, 2014, at age 76.

== Members ==
- Jay Uzzell
- James Uzzell
- Moses Uzzell Sr.
- George Wooten

== Singles ==
- "Time Waits" b/w "It Won't Be a Sin" (1961)
- "Smoky Places" b/w "Thinkin'" (1961, Pop number 12, R&B number 10)
- "I'll Take You Home" b/w "Sittin' on Your Doorstep" (1962, Pop number 62)
- "Dancing Shadows" b/w "While" (1962)
- "At the Stroke of Midnight" b/w "Listen to My Little Heart" (1962)
- "Stormy" b/w "It's Almost Sunday Morning" (1963)
- "Save a Little Monkey" b/w "Save a Little Monkey (Instrumental)" (1963)
- "The Change in You" b/w "On the Spanish Side" (1964, as Landy McNeil & the Corsairs)
