= M.I.U. Album =

1978 album by the Beach Boys

Studio album by the Beach Boys
- Released: September 25, 1978
- Recorded: October 1976 ("Hey Little Tomboy"); November 1977 – June 1978
- Studios: Maharishi International University (Fairfield); Brother (Santa Monica); Wally Heider (Hollywood); Kaye-Smith (Seattle)
- Genre: Easy listening
- Length: 32:19
- Label: Brother/Reprise
- Producers: Al Jardine; Ron Altbach

The Beach Boys chronology
| The Beach Boys Love You (1977) | M.I.U. Album (1978) | L.A. (Light Album) (1979) |

Singles from M.I.U. Album
- 1. "Peggy Sue" b/w "Hey Little Tomboy" Released: August 28, 1978

M.I.U. Album is the 22nd studio album by the American rock band the Beach Boys, released on September 25, 1978 by Brother/Reprise. Characterized for its easy-listening sound, the album was produced by Al Jardine and touring member Ron Altbach during one of the most acrimonious periods in the band's history. It sold poorly, peaking at number 151 in the U.S., and was met with confused reactions from critics and fans.

Created to fulfill contractual obligations to Reprise after shelving Adult/Child, a completed album intended as Brian Wilson's follow-up to Love You, M.I.U. Album was largely recorded in late 1977 at its namesake: Maharishi International University in Fairfield, Iowa. Only Jardine, Brian, and Mike Love appear consistently throughout the album, with Carl and Dennis Wilson's contributions confined to a pair of tracks. Brian was credited as "executive producer". It additionally includes two reworked Love You outtakes, "Hey Little Tomboy" and "My Diane", as well as cover versions of the 1950s hits "Peggy Sue" and "Come Go with Me".

In 1981, "Come Go with Me" reached number 18 when it was issued as a single from the compilation Ten Years of Harmony. In 1998, several songs that were intended for the unreleased album Merry Christmas from the Beach Boys, which was produced during the M.I.U. sessions, were released on the compilation Ultimate Christmas.

== Background ==
At the beginning of 1977, the Beach Boys had enjoyed their most lucrative concert tours ever, with the band playing in packed stadiums and earning up to $150,000 per show. Early that year, Brian Wilson produced Adult/Child, which would have been their final record on Reprise, a subsidiary of Warner Bros. It was largely recorded by Brian with Dennis and Carl while Al Jardine and Mike Love were preoccupied elsewhere. In Love's case, he had been ensconced at a six-month Transcendental Meditation retreat, called "the TM-Sidhi program", in Vittel, France and Leysin, Switzerland, where he studied levitation under Maharishi Mahesh Yogi. (Note: Mike's stay at the program lasted from January to June 1977.)

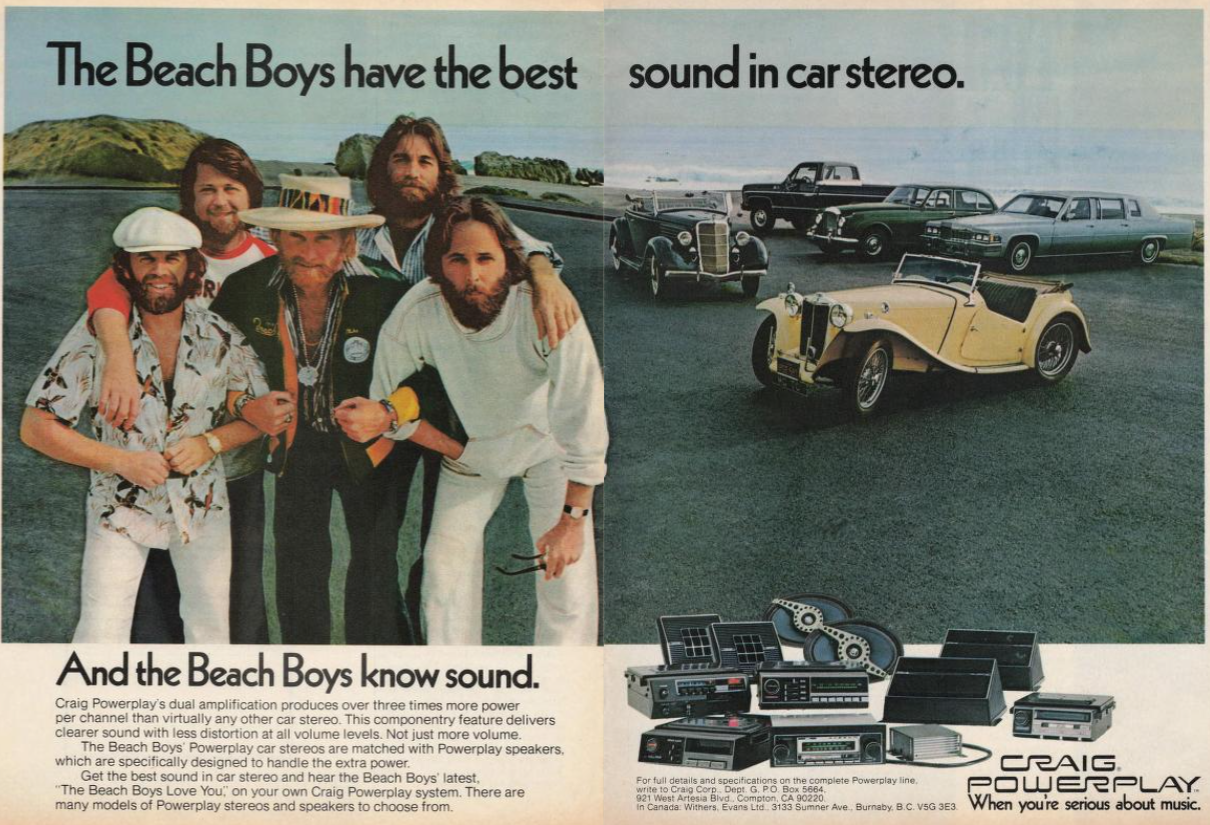
The group pictured in a 1977 car stereo ad promoting The Beach Boys Love You

Concurrently, the band were the subject of a record company bidding war, as their contract with Warner had been set to expire soon. Band manager and business advisor Stephen Love arranged for the Beach Boys to sign an $8 million deal with CBS Records on March 1. Biographer Steven Gaines writes that Warner "knew of the CBS deal" and were "so disgusted with the band at this point" that the label refused to promote the group's forthcoming album, The Beach Boys Love You. Within weeks of the CBS contract, Stephen was effectively fired by the band, with one of the alleged reasons being that Mike had not permitted Stephen to sign on his behalf while in Switzerland. (Note: Gaines writes, "Insiders say this change in Mike's attitude occurred when he realized that the CBS contract did not have the special riders he wanted that would have allowed him to record solo albums under their label. Meanwhile, Dennis, through his friend James Guercio, was getting a $100,000 advance from CBS to record his own solo album.") The release of Adult/Child was vetoed due to its content and the commercial failure of Love You, issued in April.

Stephen's replacement was entertainment business owner Henry Lazarus, who arranged a major European tour for the Beach Boys starting in June. (Note: Part of the CBS deal required the group to play a certain number of concerts in the U.S., Europe, Australia and Japan.) The tour was cancelled prematurely, as Lazarus had failed to complete the necessary paperwork. This resulted in the group being sued by many of the concert promoters, with losses of $200,000 in preliminary expenses and $550,000 in potential revenue. In August, Mike and Jardine persuaded Stephen to return as the group's manager, a decision that Carl and Dennis had strongly opposed. On September 1, the internal wrangling came to a head after a show at Central Park, when the band effectively split into two camps: Dennis and Carl on one side, Mike and Jardine on the other, with Brian remaining neutral. By then, the two opposing contingents within the group – known among their associates as the "free-livers" and the "meditators" – were traveling in different planes, using different hotels, and rarely speaking to each other. (Note: According to Love, "[T]he terms 'smokers' and 'nonsmokers' were also used.")

On September 2, Mike, Jardine, and Brian met with Stephen at their hotel in New York and signed the documents necessary to officially appoint him as the Beach Boys' manager. The next day, after completing the final date of a northeastern tour, a confrontation between the "free-livers" and the "meditators" broke out on an airport tarmac during a stopover in Newark. Dennis subsequently declared to a bystanding Rolling Stone journalist that he had left the band. In a follow-up interview, Love denied that the group had broken up, but Dennis maintained, "I can assure you that the group broke up and you witnessed it." However, the group were still legally obligated to deliver one more album to Warner. Two weeks later, on September 17, the band members, their lawyers, and their wives reconvened at Brian's house, where they negotiated a settlement resulting in Mike gaining control of Brian's vote in the group, allowing Mike and Jardine to outvote Carl and Dennis on any matter.

== Style and production ==
=== Iowa sessions ===
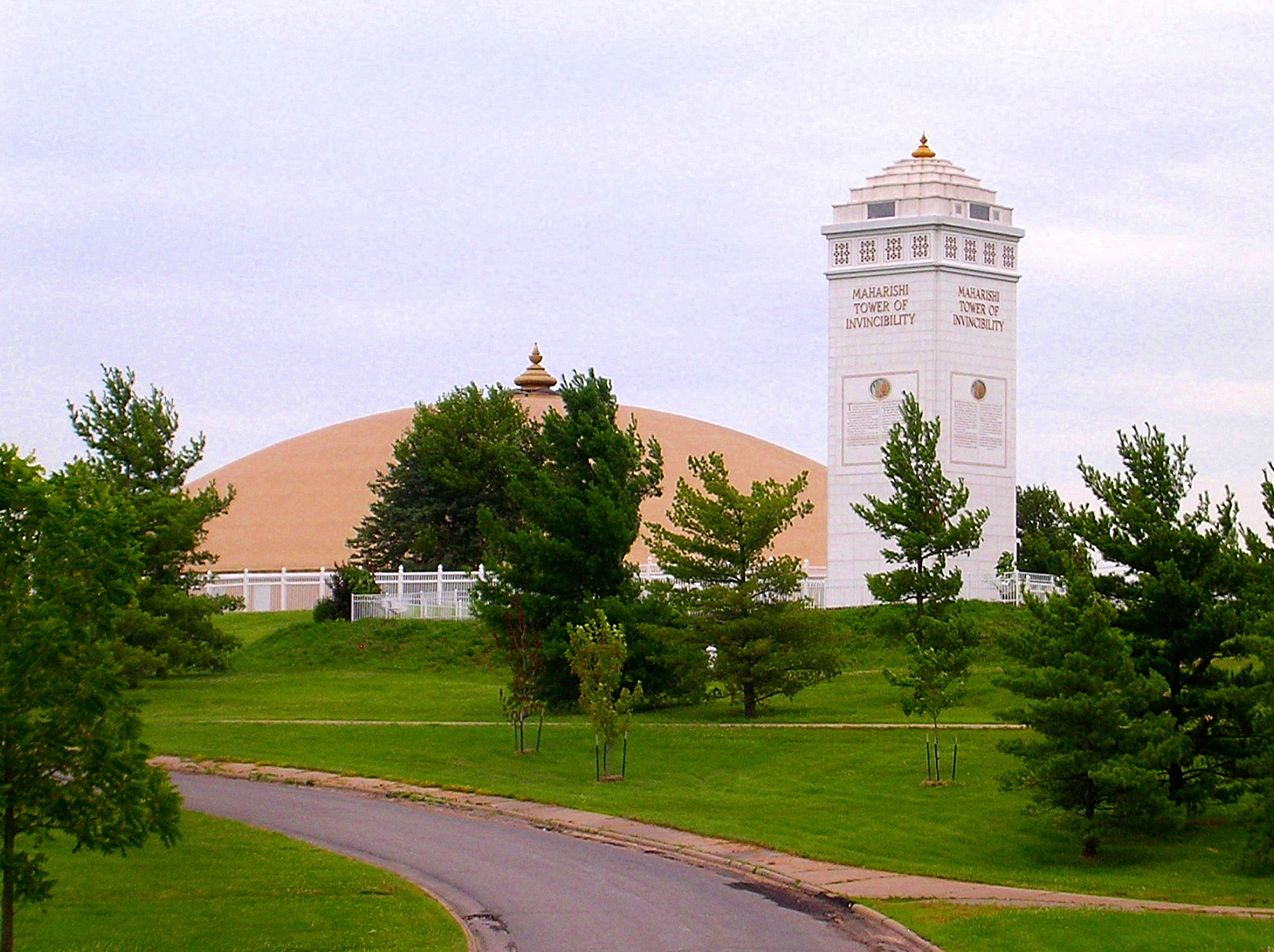
Maharishi International University in Fairfield, Iowa, where most of M.I.U. Album was recorded

To satisfy the terms of their contracts with Warner and CBS, the Beach Boys intended to record two albums – one for Warner and the other for CBS – at Maharishi International University in Fairfield, Iowa. Mike chose this venue to keep members of the band away from their drug suppliers in Los Angeles. (Note: Love later wrote, "By the winter of '77, we had grown increasingly concerned about Carl and believed that a healthier environment might pull him out of his spiral. We thought it'd be good for Dennis as well. If nothing else, we figured there were fewer temptations in the middle of Iowa.") At MIU, the group and their family members took residence in the university's circular dorm rooms, and attended meditation classes and meetings. The recording sessions lasted from November 7 to December 4, 1977. AFM documentation indicates that Carl visited on two days, while Dennis, who was busy promoting his solo album Pacific Ocean Blue, played drums on an early session for "She's Got Rhythm".

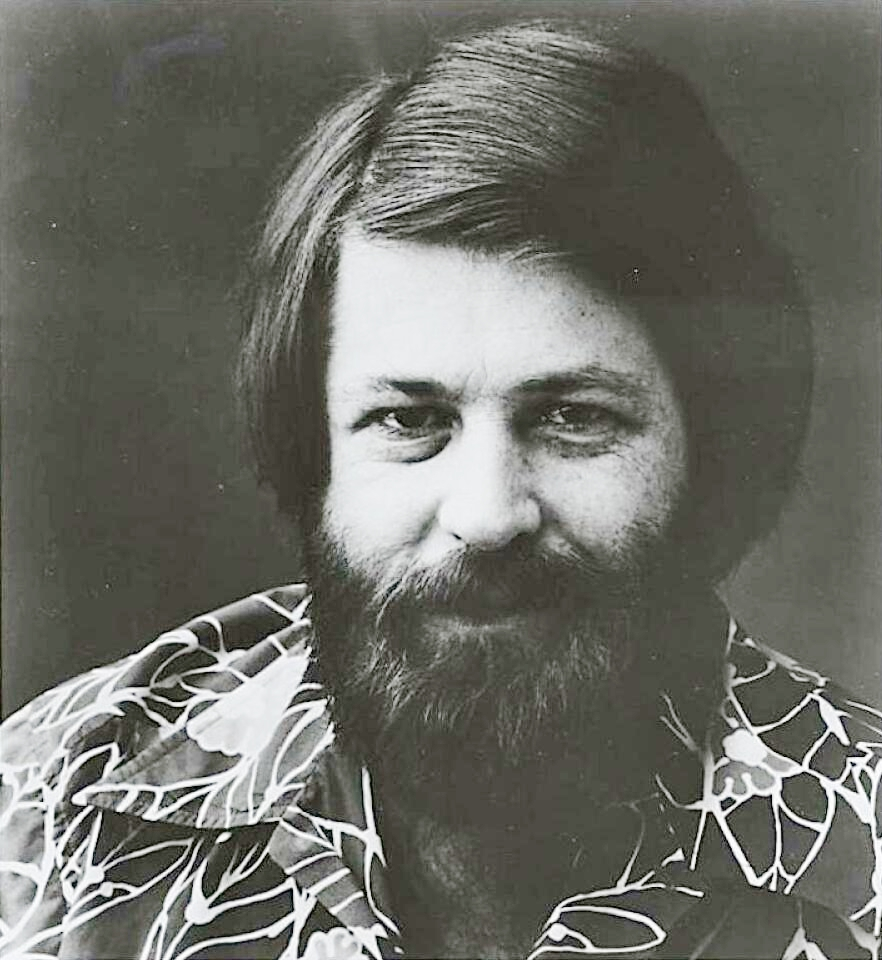
Brian Wilson (pictured 1977) was reported to be "miserable" throughout the M.I.U. sessions and had resented collaborating with Mike Love on most of the album's songs.

The album was produced by Al Jardine and, from the group's touring band, keyboardist Ron Altbach. Gaines writes that the atmosphere was similar to when the group recorded their 1973 album Holland, "only worse." According to Love, Carl and Dennis "took the whole experience [...] as a personal affront, and they came and went with little interest in the music. Brian was with us but miserable throughout." Brian's bodyguard Stan Love described the overall proceedings as "torture. Agony. Like being put right in the middle of nowhere, frozen and cold and small, with only one decent restaurant in town. Brian was putting in his time, but he wasn't too happy. He was depressed and on medication. We passed the time playing Ping-Pong." Stan added that Wilson did not want to produce his bandmates because he resented them personally. In particular, "Brian didn't want to write with [Mike] anymore, but of course Mike tried to hang on, doing his arrogant pressure trip on him."

In a 1995 interview, Brian stated that he could not remember making the album, claiming that he had gone through a "mental blank-out" during this period. He was credited as the album's "executive producer", but according to biographer Peter Ames Carlin, the credit was likely for contractual reasons. Carlin characterizes the record as having "a generic easy-listening sound, heavy on the tinkly keyboards and sweeping strings, with nary a trace of Brian's ear for quirky texture." It included the Love You outtake "My Diane", sung by Dennis, and written by Brian as an expression of anguish following the end of his affair with his sister-in-law, Diane Rovell.

=== Discarded tracks and further recording ===
Merry Christmas from the Beach Boys was the other album that the band produced at these sessions, consisting of reworkings of tracks that had dated from the early to mid-1970s, as well as alternate Christmas-themed versions of songs from M.I.U.. Biographer Timothy White reported that Winds of Change and California Feeling were both working titles for M.I.U.. According to music historian Andrew Doe,

[F]or the longest time, it was accepted that the band recorded the seasonal set first and when that was (rightly) rejected, they reworked some of the tracks into another album, California Feeling (which evolved into M.I.U. Album), but research into the sessions held at MIU reveals that songs from both albums were recorded in tandem, often at the same session, and that the California Feeling album was assembled at the end of 1977 back in Los Angeles. Confusing, to say the least.

On December 13, 1977, the band held a session – for the vocal to "My Diane" and a Toys for Tots PSA – at Kaye-Smiths Studios in Seattle that was filmed for the television special Our Team. Intermittent sessions for M.I.U. – specifically, for the tracks "My Diane", "Belles of Paris", and "Winds of Change" – continued at Brother Studios and Wally Heider Recording from February 22 to June 28, 1978. The outtakes "Our Team" and "Why" were released on the box sets Good Vibrations (1993) and Made in California (2013), respectively. Still-unreleased tracks include "Beach Burlesque", "Go and Get That Girl", "How's About a Little Bit of Your Sweet Lovin'?", "Mike, Come Back to L.A", a demo of "Almost Summer", and other tracks related to the Merry Christmas album.

== Release ==
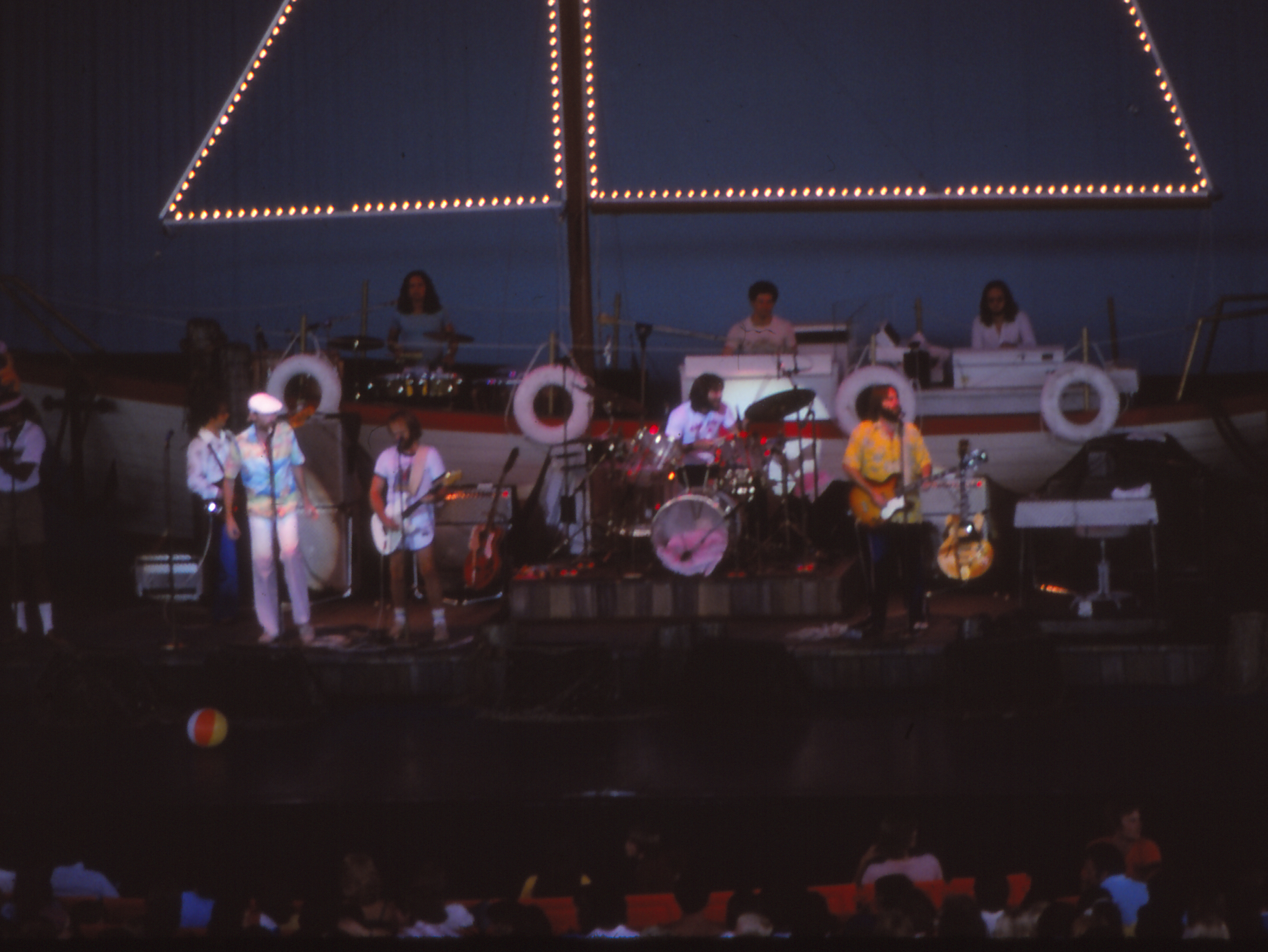
The Beach Boys performing a concert in Michigan, August 1978

Music journalist Richard Williams reported, "Love and Jardine tried to offer M.I.U. Album to Epic, as the first delivery under their new deal. That they were turned down, on grounds of quality, is a tribute to Epic's discretion."

Lead single "Peggy Sue" was issued in the U.S. in August and peaked at number 59. M.I.U. was released in September and reached number 151 in the U.S., becoming their first album to miss the UK chart completely since The Beach Boys' Christmas Album (1964). The Jardine-led cover of the Del-Vikings' "Come Go with Me" became a U.S. No. 18 hit in late 1981, when it was released as a single from the Ten Years of Harmony compilation.

== Critical reception ==
Contemporary professional ratings
Review scores
| Source | Rating |
|---|---|
| Sounds | 4/5 stars |

Retrospective professional ratings
Review scores
| Source | Rating |
|---|---|
| AllMusic | 2/5 stars |
| Blender | 2/5 stars |
| Christgau's Record Guide | C |
| The Encyclopedia of Popular Music | 1/5 stars |
| MusicHound Rock | woof! |
| The Rolling Stone Album Guide | 1/5 stars |

M.I.U Album was met with confusion from critics and fans, and, by the 2000s, widely regarded as one of the Beach Boys' worst albums. According to music critic Nick Kent, the album was so "dreadful" that its "pitiful content" was ignored by critics. Upon release, Rolling Stone's Tom Carson stated,

M.I.U. Album seems contrived and artificial right from the start. The tracks strive to recapture the dreamy, adolescent innocence of the Beach Boys' earliest hits, and fail not so much because the concepts are dated but because the group can't infuse the new material with the same sense of grandeur. [...] Throughout, the lackluster playing and singing has a melancholy edge, almost as if the Beach Boys are fully aware that they've outgrown this kind of teen fantasy, but can't think of anyplace else to go.

Vivien Goldman of Sounds found the album to be "magic" and added that she "played it non-stop, even if it seemed a baffling sconed adolescence" before concluding, "If there weren't some weirdo psychological reason, how could I get so involved with lyrics that one part of mind is consciously stating: this is moronic drivel?" Richard Williams, who had championed the Beach Boys' work in the 1960s, wrote a negative review in which he surmised that Brian was "obviously encouraged to deliver the adolescent pap of 'Hey Little Tomboy', so that the dark emotions and warm textures of 'Diane' are thrown into higher relief."

In a retrospective review, AllMusic's John Bush stated, "The mainstream late-'70s production techniques are predictable and frequently cloying. M.I.U. Album also included several of the worst Beach Boys songs ever to make it to vinyl. [...] Compared with what had come before, M.I.U. Album was a pathetic attempt at music making; compared with what was to come however, this was a highlight." In his 2006 biography of Wilson, Carlin referred to it as "the most cynical, spiritually void work the group ever produced", a "gruesome album", and perhaps "one of the worst records ever made by a great rock band."

Conversely, Jeff Tamarkin, who wrote liner notes for the album's CD reissue, decreed that the album "stands on it's [sic] own as a lovely, unique work." In 1981, Robert Christgau called the album "dumb [...] despite a lot of fairly pleasant music and a few passable songs". Reviewing the album's 2002 reissue, The A.V. Club's Keith Phipps stated, "M.I.U. is competent enough, but it's also the sound of a group buying into its own mythology, a retrograde salute to the pinstripes and sunshine image it had abandoned years before."

== Legacy ==
Reflecting on M.I.U. Album in a 1992 interview, Mike Love opined that "there's some neat gems there but there wasn't a coherence." Asked about the album in a 1979 interview, Dennis Wilson said, "I hope that karma will fuck up Mike Love's meditation forever. That album is an embarrassment to my life. It should self-destruct."

== Track listing ==
Track details per 2000 CD liner notes and the Winter 2023 issue of Endless Summer Quarterly.

Side one
| No. | Title | Writer(s) | Lead vocal(s) | Length |
|---|---|---|---|---|
| 1. | "She's Got Rhythm" | Brian Wilson, Mike Love, Ron Altbach | B. Wilson and Love | 2:27 |
| 2. | "Come Go with Me" | C.E. Quick | Al Jardine with Love | 2:06 |
| 3. | "Hey Little Tomboy" | B. Wilson | B. Wilson, Love and Carl Wilson | 2:25 |
| 4. | "Kona Coast" | Al Jardine, Love | Love and Jardine | 2:33 |
| 5. | "Peggy Sue" | Buddy Holly, Jerry Allison, Norman Petty | Jardine | 2:15 |
| 6. | "Wontcha Come Out Tonight" | B. Wilson, Love | B. Wilson and Love | 2:30 |

Side two
| No. | Title | Writer(s) | Lead vocal(s) | Length |
|---|---|---|---|---|
| 1. | "Sweet Sunday Kinda Love" | B. Wilson, Love | C. Wilson | 2:42 |
| 2. | "Belles of Paris" | B. Wilson, Love, Altbach | Love | 2:27 |
| 3. | "Pitter Patter" | B. Wilson, Love, Jardine | Love and Jardine | 3:14 |
| 4. | "My Diane" | B. Wilson | Dennis Wilson | 2:37 |
| 5. | "Match Point of Our Love" | B. Wilson, Love | B. Wilson | 3:29 |
| 6. | "Winds of Change" | Altbach, Ed Tuleja | Jardine and Love | 3:14 |
| Total length: | | | | 32:19 |

== Personnel ==
Credits sourced from Craig Slowinski, John Brode, Will Crerar, Joshilyn Hoisington and David Beard.

The Beach Boys

- Al Jardine – lead (2, 4, 5, 9, 12) and backing vocals (all but 3), electric (4, 9) and acoustic guitars (2, 8), tack piano (2), bass guitar (2, 3?, 10?), handclaps (1, 2, 5), fingersnaps (2), glockenspiel (2), vocal arrangements
- Mike Love – lead (1–4, 6, 8, 9, 12) and backing vocals (all but 3), handclaps (1, 5)
- Brian Wilson – lead (1, 3, 6, 11) and backing vocals (all tracks), piano (1, 6–8, 10, 11), tack piano (3), electric piano (9), electric harpsichord (5), handclaps (1, 5), vocal and horn arrangements
- Carl Wilson – lead (3, 7) and backing vocals (2, 3, 5, 9, 10), 12-string electric guitar (1, 6, 9), electric guitar (3), handclaps (1, 5)
- Dennis Wilson – lead (10) and backing vocals (3, 10), drums (3, 5, 10), additional drums (1)

Touring musicians

- Michael Andreas – saxophone (1, 6, 11), flute (1, 12), horn arrangements
- Ron Altbach – piano (12), electric piano (1, 4, 6–9, 11), accordion (6), ARP Omni (1), vibraphone (3, 4, 10, 11), xylophone (4), trombone (1, 12)
- Lance Buller – trumpet (12)
- Gary Griffin – electric piano (4), organ (1, 6, 7, 11), Minimoog (3, 6), tubular bells (1), string arrangements
- Ed Carter – electric (1, 6, 7, 11) and acoustic guitars (8), bass guitar (3?, 4, 8, 9, 10?)
- John Foss – trumpet (1, 12), flugelhorn (12)
- Billy Hinsche – backing vocals (10), electric guitar (10)
- Mike Kowalski – drums (1, 3, 4, 6–9, 11, 12), congas (1, 11), bongos (1), sleigh bells (1, 3, 4, 6, 9), tambourine (7, 10), shaker (3, 11), guiro (3, 11), wood block (12), tubular bells (8), mark-tree (9, 11)
- Charles Lloyd – flute (12)
- Charlie McCarthy – flute (12)

Additional players

- Rusty Ford – bass guitar (1, 7, 11)
- Chris Midaugh – steel pedal guitar (4, 9)
- Marilyn Rovell – backing vocals (6)
- Diane Rovell – backing vocals (6)
- Jay Graydon – electric guitars (5)
- Frank Marocco – accordion (5)
- Ray Pohlman – bass guitar (5)
- Ricky Fataar – drums (2)
- Julius Wechter – sleigh bells (5), vibraphone (5)
- Matt Jardine – handclaps (2), fingersnaps (2)
- Michael Sherry – handclaps (2), fingersnaps (2)
- Richard Hurwitz – trumpet (6)
- Raymond Brown – trumpet (6)
- Vincent Fanuele – trombone (6)
- Steve Douglas – tenor saxophones (5)
- Jay Migliori – baritone saxophones (5)
- William Collette – saxophone (6)
- Bill Green – saxophone (6)
- Maureen Love – harp (10, 12)
- Roberleigh Barnhardt – string arrangements
- Bernard Kundell, Alfred Breuning, Thomas Buffum, Herman Clebanoff, Cynthia Kovacs, Jay Rosen – violins (6, 8, 10, 12)
- Rollice Dale, Mark Kovacs, Linda Lipsett – violas (6, 8, 10, 12)
- Marie Fera, Igor Horoshevsky, Victor Sazer – cellos (6, 8, 10, 12)
- Unknown – saxophones (2), strings (7, 11)

Recording engineering personnel & assistants

- Al Jardine – producer
- Ron Altbach – producer
- Brian Wilson – executive producer
- Diane Rovell – music coordinator
- John Hanlon – recording engineer
- Earle Mankey – recording engineer
- Stephen Moffitt – recording engineer
- Jeff Peters – recording engineer, final mixdown producer
- Bob Rose – recording engineer

Artwork

- Dean O. Torrence – album design, graphics
- The Beach Boys – album design, graphics
- Warren Bolster/Surfer Magazine – front cover photography
- Guy Webster – back cover photography

== Charts ==
| Chart (1978) | Peak position |
|---|---|
| US Billboard Top LPs & Tape | 151 |

== Bibliography ==
- Badman, Keith (2004). The Beach Boys: The Definitive Diary of America's Greatest Band, on Stage and in the Studio. Backbeat Books. ISBN 978-0-87930-818-6.
- Carlin, Peter Ames (2006). Catch a Wave: The Rise, Fall, and Redemption of the Beach Boys' Brian Wilson. Rodale. ISBN 978-1-59486-320-2.
- Dillon, Mark (2012). Fifty Sides of the Beach Boys: The Songs That Tell Their Story. ECW Press. ISBN 978-1-77090-198-8.
- Gaines, Steven (1986). Heroes and Villains: The True Story of The Beach Boys. New York: Da Capo Press. ISBN 0306806479.
- Goldman, Vivien (September 23, 1978). "Beach Boys 'Miu' (Weak MSK 2268) ****". Sounds. p. 40.
- Love, Mike (2016). Good Vibrations: My Life as a Beach Boy. Penguin Publishing Group. ISBN 978-0-698-40886-9.
- Stebbins, Jon (2000). Dennis Wilson: The Real Beach Boy. ECW Press. ISBN 978-1-55022-404-7.
- White, Timothy (1996). The Nearest Faraway Place: Brian Wilson, the Beach Boys, and the Southern Californian Experience. Macmillan. ISBN 0333649370.
- Williams, Richard (1997) [1978]. "M.I.U. Review". In Abbott, Kingsley (ed.). Back to the Beach (1st ed.). London: Helter Skelter. ISBN 978-1900924023.
