= Smoky Places =

Single by The Corsairs
- B-side: "Thinkin' (Maybe She's Changed Her Ways)"
- Released: November 1961
- Genre: Doo-wop
- Length: 2:59
- Label: Tuff
- Songwriter: Abner Spector
- Producer: Abner Spector

The Corsairs singles chronology
| "It Won't Be a Sin" (1961) | "Smoky Places" (1961) | "I'll Take You Home" (1962) |

"Smoky Places" is a song written by Abner Spector and performed by The Corsairs. It reached #10 on the U.S. R&B chart and #12 on the U.S. pop chart in 1962.

The song was arranged by Sammy Lowe and produced by Abner Spector.

The song ranked #51 on Billboard magazine's Top 100 singles of 1962.

== Other charting versions ==
- Billy Walker released a version of the song as a single in 1969 which reached #12 on the U.S. country chart.

== Other versions ==
- Billy Swan released a version of the song on his 1977 album Four.
- The Beach Boys recorded a version of the song on October 18, 1979, featuring Brian Wilson on lead vocal. The track has yet to be officially released.
- Bob Regan released a version of the song as a single in 1983, but it did not chart.
- Charlie McCoy released a version of the song on his 1991 album Out on a Limb.
- Ronnie McDowell featuring Bill Pinkney's Original Drifters released a version of the song on his 2002 album Ronnie McDowell with Bill Pinkney's Original Drifters.

== In popular culture ==
- The song was featured in the 1994 film There Goes My Baby.
- The song was featured in the 2006 Sopranos' episode "Mayham".
