= Alone on Christmas Day =

Song written by Mike Love and Ron Altbach

Song by The Beach Boys

from the album Merry Christmas from the Beach Boys
- Recorded: November 17–22, 1977
- Songwriters: Mike Love, Ron Altbach
- Producers: Al Jardine, Ron Altbach

"Alone on Christmas Day"

Single by Phoenix featuring Bill Murray, Paul Shaffer, Jason Schwartzman and Buster Poindexter

from the album A Very Murray Christmas soundtrack
- B-side: "Alone on Christmas Day (Instrumental)"
- Released: December 4, 2015
- Recorded: 2015
- Length: 2:54
- Songwriters: Mike Love, Ron Altbach

Phoenix singles chronology
"S.O.S. in Bel Air" (2013)	"Alone on Christmas Day" (2015)	"J-Boy" (2017)

Music video
- "Alone on Christmas Day" on YouTube

"Alone on Christmas Day"

Song by Mike Love

from the album Reason for the Season
- Released: October 26, 2018
- Length: 4:05
- Label: BMG
- Songwriters: Mike Love, Ron Altbach
- Producers: Michael Lloyd, Scott Totten

"Alone on Christmas Day" is a song written by Mike Love and Ron Altbach for American rock band the Beach Boys. Intended for a potential Christmas album, their 1977 recording was left unreleased. In November 2015, Mike Love rerecorded the song as "(You'll Never Be) Alone on Christmas Day" and released it as a single. The next month, a version by French rock band Phoenix featuring Bill Murray was released.

== Background ==
The song was written by the Beach Boys' co-founder Mike Love in collaboration with classical pianist Ron Altbach for a potential Christmas album. In 1977, a rough mix of the song was recorded by the group and later circulated via bootlegs. In early 2015, Phoenix requested permission to cover the song for Bill Murray's A Very Murray Christmas. In response, Love rerecorded the song himself and revised some of the lyrics. The version by Phoenix was then released. Besides Murray, their recording features Jason Schwartzman, Paul Shaffer, and Buster Poindexter (the stage name of New York Dolls' David Johansen). Phoenix's version was recorded in September and issued as a digital download and 7" vinyl. Love recorded another version of the song for his 2018 Christmas album Reason for the Season.

== Charts ==
Chart performance for "Alone on Christmas Day"
Chart (2015)	Peak position
US Holiday Digital Song Sales (Billboard)	42
