= Ron Altbach =

American keyboardist and songwriter (1946–2023)

- Born: Ronald Steven Altbach; December 24, 1946; Olcott, New York, U.S.
- Died: February 21, 2023 (aged 76) Manhattan, New York, U.S.
- Instruments: Piano, keyboards
- Formerly of: Celebration, King Harvest, The Beach Boys

Ronald Steven Altbach (December 24, 1946 – February 21, 2023) was an American keyboardist and songwriter who co-founded French-American rock band King Harvest, and played the Wurlitzer electric piano intro on their single "Dancing in the Moonlight" (1972). He later became a session keyboardist for The Beach Boys and penned songs for the group. Altbach was a member of Celebration, a group led by Beach Boys co-founder Mike Love. In 1979, Altbach played keyboards in the band Clean Athletic & Talented (C.A.T.); the band, including John Huff, recorded an album.

Altbach's contributions to the Beach Boys include co-producing M.I.U. Album (1978) and co-writing songs such as "Belles of Paris", "She's Got Rhythm", and "Alone on Christmas Day".

Altbach died on February 21, 2023, at the age of 76.
