= The Capitol Years (The Beach Boys album) =

Box set by The Beach Boys
- Released: 1980
- Recorded: 1960–1969
- Genre: Pop
- Length: 250:04
- Label: Capitol
- Producer: Brian Wilson

The Beach Boys chronology
Ultimate Christmas (1998)	The Capitol Years (1980)	The Greatest Hits – Volume 1: 20 Good Vibrations (1999)

Professional ratings
Review scores
Source	Rating
Allmusic	3/5 stars

The Capitol Years is a 4-CD box set which documents The Beach Boys' career with the Capitol Records label. It was originally released in 1980 through Reader's Digest as a 7-LP boxed set, which included a bonus LP of Brian Wilson's non-Beach Boys productions for Capitol. In 1988, EMI Records Australia released 4-CD and 6-cassette versions that excluded the bonus LP.

It features 106 tracks from their time with Capitol.

== Track listing ==
Summertime U.S.A.

1. "Surfin'"
2. "Surfin' Safari"
3. "Ten Little Indians"
4. "Surfin' U.S.A."
5. "Catch a Wave"
6. "Hawaii"
7. "Surfers Rule"
8. "Surfer Girl"
9. "Don't Back Down"
10. "Little Deuce Coupe"
11. "409"
12. "In the Parkin' Lot"
13. "Car Crazy Cutie"
14. "Spirit of America"
15. "Shut Down"
16. "Custom Machine"
17. "Drive-In"
18. "Cherry, Cherry Coupe"
19. "Little Honda"

California Dream

1. "Be True to Your School"
2. "Fun, Fun, Fun"
3. "Why Do Fools Fall in Love"
4. "All Summer Long"
5. "I Get Around"
6. "Wendy"
7. "When I Grow Up (To Be a Man)"
8. "Little Saint Nick"
9. "Christmas Day"
10. "Auld Lang Syne"
11. "Don't Worry Baby"
12. "Your Summer Dream"
13. "In My Room"
14. "The Warmth of the Sun"
15. "Keep an Eye on Summer"
16. "Girls on the Beach"
17. "Please Let Me Wonder"
18. "Hushabye"
19. "The Lord's Prayer"

Sunshine Music

1. "Dance, Dance, Dance"
2. "The Little Girl I Once Knew"
3. "Good to My Baby"
4. "Help Me, Rhonda"
5. "Do You Wanna Dance?"
6. "You're So Good to Me"
7. "Don't Hurt My Little Sister"
8. "She Knows Me Too Well"
9. "California Girls"
10. "The Little Old Lady from Pasadena"
11. "Graduation Day"
12. "Monster Mash"
13. "Johnny B. Goode"
14. "Barbara Ann"
15. "There's No Other (Like My Baby)"
16. "Devoted to You"
17. "Mountain of Love"
18. "Aren't You Glad"
19. "Their Hearts Were Full of Spring"

Changes

1. "Then I Kissed Her"
2. "Kiss Me, Baby"
3. "Let Him Run Wild"
4. "Amusement Parks USA"
5. "I'm So Young"
6. "Girl Don't Tell Me"
7. "Salt Lake City"
8. "The Girl from New York City"
9. "Sloop John B"
10. "Here Today"
11. "Caroline, No"
12. "I'm Waiting for the Day"
13. "You Still Believe in Me"
14. "I Know There's an Answer"
15. "Wouldn't It Be Nice"
16. "God Only Knows"
17. "I Just Wasn't Made for These Times"

Timeless

1. "Good Vibrations"
2. "Wind Chimes"
3. "Cabin Essence"
4. "Vegetables"
5. "Wonderful"
6. "Our Prayer"
7. "Heroes and Villains"
8. "Darlin'"
9. "Gettin' Hungry"
10. "Here Comes the Night"
11. "With Me Tonight"
12. "Wake the World"
13. "Country Air"
14. "You're Welcome"
15. "I'd Love Just Once to See You"
16. "Wild Honey"

Break Away

1. "Do It Again"
2. "Little Bird"
3. "Let the Wind Blow"
4. "Busy Doin' Nothin'"
5. "Passing By"
6. "Time to Get Alone"
7. "Be Here in the Mornin'"
8. "Friends"
9. "I Can Hear Music"
10. "Never Learn Not to Love"
11. "Cotton Fields"
12. "I Went to Sleep"
13. "Bluebirds over the Mountain"
14. "Celebrate the News"
15. "Be with Me"
16. "Break Away"
