= Keep an Eye on Summer – The Beach Boys Sessions 1964 =

Compilation album by The Beach Boys
- Released: December 2, 2014
- Recorded: October 18, 1963 – November 6, 1964
- Venues: Sacramento Memorial Auditorium, California (December 1963); BBC Playhouse Theatre, London (November 1964)
- Studios: Capitol Studios, CBS Columbia Square, Gold Star Studios, RCA Victor Studios, United Western Recorders, Hollywood
- Genres: Rock, surf rock, rock and roll
- Label: Capitol
- Producers: Alan Boyd; Mark Linett; Brian Wilson (original recordings)

The Beach Boys chronology
The Big Beat 1963 (2013)	Keep an Eye on Summer – The Beach Boys Sessions 1964 (2014)	Live in Sacramento 1964 (2014)

Keep an Eye on Summer – The Beach Boys Sessions 1964 is a compilation album of studio and live recordings by the Beach Boys, released on December 2, 2014 exclusively through the iTunes Store. It is a follow-up to the similar release The Big Beat 1963, composed of various selections related to Brian Wilson and the Beach Boys, released one year earlier.

== Background ==
The compilation's release came as a result of revised European copyright laws, forcing some labels to publish unreleased archival material so that they will not lose their copyright. Keep an Eye on Summer is one of two such releases by Capitol Records in 2014, the other being Live in Sacramento 1964.

According to compilation producer Alan Boyd in the album's digital liner notes: "This new collection, made possible by the fact that the Beach Boys, starting in 1964, made a point of holding onto their work reels (and greatly enhanced by the recent recovery of some long lost tapes from the Shut Down Vol. 2 album sessions) shows the Beach Boys at their zenith, offering glimpses of the camaraderie, optimism and high spirits behind the creation of these timeless records, and highlighting the incredible vocal arrangements, compositional skills, and rapidly evolving production techniques that placed the Beach Boys and Brian Wilson at the forefront of pop music in 1964 and for all time."

== Track listing ==
Track descriptions from Craig Slowinski, with producers/archivists Mark Linett and Alan Boyd.

All tracks are written by Brian Wilson and Mike Love, except where otherwise stated.

No.	Title	Writer(s)	Length
1.	"Fun, Fun, Fun" (session excerpt, followed by backing track)
2.	"Fun, Fun, Fun" (a cappella)
3.	"Fun, Fun, Fun" (stereo mix, previously released on Made in California)
4.	"Why Do Fools Fall in Love" (session excerpt, followed by backing track)	Frankie Lymon, Morris Levy
5.	"Why Do Fools Fall In Love" (new stereo mix)	Lymon, Levy
6.	"Don't Worry Baby" (session excerpt, followed by backing track with background vocals)	Brian Wilson, Roger Christian
7.	"Don't Worry Baby" (stereo mix, previously released on Summer Love Songs)	B Wilson, Christian
8.	"In the Parkin' Lot" (session excerpt, followed by a cappella version)	B. Wilson, Christian
9.	"The Warmth of the Sun" (session excerpt, followed by backing track with background vocals)
10.	"The Warmth of the Sun" (stereo mix, previously released on Made in California)
11.	"Pom Pom Play Girl" (session excerpt, followed by backing track with background vocals)	B Wilson, Gary Usher
12.	"Pom Pom Play Girl" (new stereo mix)	B Wilson, Usher
13.	"Denny's Drums" (session excerpt, followed by alternate version)	Dennis Wilson
14.	"Keep an Eye on Summer" (backing track with background vocals)
15.	"Endless Sleep" (previously unreleased)	Dolores Nance, Jody Reynolds
16.	"I Get Around" (session excerpt, followed by backing track)
17.	"I Get Around" (a cappella)
18.	"All Summer Long" (session excerpt, followed by backing track)
19.	"All Summer Long" (a cappella)
20.	"All Summer Long" (stereo mix, previously released on The Warmth of the Sun)
21.	"Hushabye" (backing track with background vocals)	Doc Pomus, Mort Shuman
22.	"Girls on the Beach" (session excerpt, followed by a cappella version)	B. Wilson
23.	"Wendy" (session excerpt, followed by a cappella version)
24.	"Don't Back Down" (new stereo mix)
25.	"Little Saint Nick" (session excerpt, followed by Drive-In version)
26.	"Untitled Jam / Let's Live Before We Die" (session excerpt ("Untitled Jam"), followed by backing track ("Let's Live Before We Die"))	B. Wilson
27.	"Little Honda" (session excerpt, followed by new stereo mix)
28.	"Little Honda" (single version - previously unreleased)
29.	"She Knows Me Too Well" (backing track with background vocals)
30.	"She Knows Me Too Well" (a cappella)
31.	"Don't Hurt My Little Sister" (session excerpt, followed by a cappella version)
32.	"Christmas Eve" (session excerpt, followed by backing track - previously unreleased)	B. Wilson
33.	"Jingle Bells" (previously unreleased)	James Lord Pierpont
34.	"When I Grow Up" (a cappella)
35.	"Fun, Fun, Fun" (live in the studio)
36.	"I Get Around" (live in the studio)
37.	"I'm So Young" (session excerpt, followed by new stereo mix of the 1964 version)	William H. "Prez" Tyus Jr.
38.	"All Dressed Up For School" (session excerpt, followed by new stereo mix)	B. Wilson
39.	"Dance Dance Dance" (Nashville version, new stereo mix)	B. Wilson, Carl Wilson, Love
40.	"Dance, Dance, Dance" (session excerpt, followed by backing track)	B. Wilson, C. Wilson, Love
41.	"Dance, Dance, Dance" (a cappella)	B. Wilson, C. Wilson, Love
42.	"I Get Around" (live at the BBC)
43.	"The Little Old Lady from Pasadena" (live at the BBC)	Don Altfeld, Jan Berry, Christian
44.	"Graduation Day" (live at the BBC)	Joe Sherman, Noel Sherman
45.	"Surfin' USA" (live at the BBC)	B. Wilson, Love, Chuck Berry
46.	"Johnny B. Goode" (Live)	Berry

== Personnel ==
=== Compilation staff ===
- Alan Boyd – producer
- Mark Linett – producer, Mix engineer
- Monty Linett – associate producer
- Craig Slowinski – sessionography, research
