= The Platinum Collection (Sounds of Summer Edition) =

Greatest hits album by The Beach Boys
- Released: December 2005
- Recorded: 1961–1988 and 1996
- Genre: Rock
- Length: 172:03
- Label: EMI
- Producers: Brian Wilson, Bruce Johnston, Terry Melcher, Murry Wilson, Curt Becher, Albert Cabrera, James William Guercio, Al Jardine, Tony Moran, Nick Venet, Damon Wimbley

The Beach Boys chronology
Sounds of Summer: The Very Best of The Beach Boys (2003)	The Platinum Collection (Sounds of Summer Edition) (2005)	Songs from Here & Back (2006)

Professional ratings
Review scores
Source	Rating
AllMusic	4.5/5 stars
Encyclopedia of Popular Music	4/5 stars

The Platinum Collection (Sounds of Summer Edition) is a three-disc greatest hits album by American rock band The Beach Boys, released in December 2005 by EMI. It includes some of The Beach Boys' most popular songs from their early days like "California Girls" and "Surfin' U.S.A.", but also songs from their later period, when their success started to fade, like "Lady Lynda" or "Sumahama". Except for some songs from the first two albums, most previously mono tracks have been digitally remastered in stereo.

== Track listing ==
Disc 1
No.	Title	Writer(s)	Original album	Length
1.	"I Get Around"	Brian Wilson, Mike Love	All Summer Long, 1964	2:13
2.	"Don't Worry Baby"	B. Wilson, Roger Christian	Shut Down Volume 2, 1964	2:49
3.	"Surfin' U.S.A."	Chuck Berry, B. Wilson	Surfin' U.S.A., 1963	2:28
4.	"In My Room"	B. Wilson, Gary Usher	Surfer Girl, 1963	2:13
5.	"Little Deuce Coupe"	B. Wilson, Christian	Surfer Girl, 1963	1:40
6.	"Surfer Girl"	B. Wilson	Surfer Girl, 1963	2:28
7.	"Fun, Fun, Fun"	B. Wilson, Love	Shut Down Volume 2, 1964	2:20
8.	"When I Grow Up (To Be a Man)"	B. Wilson, Love	The Beach Boys Today!, 1965	2:03
9.	"Girls on the Beach"	B. Wilson	All Summer Long, 1964	2:26
10.	"All Summer Long"	B. Wilson, Love	All Summer Long, 1964	2:09
11.	"Wendy"	B. Wilson, Love	All Summer Long, 1964	2:17
12.	"Dance, Dance, Dance"	B. Wilson, Carl Wilson, Love	The Beach Boys Today!, 1965	2:02
13.	"Be True to Your School"	B. Wilson, Love	Single version, Little Deuce Coupe, 1963	2:10
14.	"The Warmth of the Sun"	B. Wilson, Love	Shut Down Volume 2, 1964	2:53
15.	"Little Honda"	B. Wilson, Love	All Summer Long, 1964	1:53
16.	"Surfin'"	B. Wilson, Love	Surfin' Safari, 1962	2:12
17.	"Surfin' Safari"	B. Wilson, Love	Surfin' Safari, 1962	2:07
18.	"Do You Wanna Dance?"	Bobby Freeman	The Beach Boys Today!, 1965	2:21
19.	"Please Let Me Wonder"	B. Wilson, Love	The Beach Boys Today!, 1965	2:47
20.	"Then I Kissed Her"	Phil Spector, Ellie Greenwich, Jeff Barry	Summer Days (And Summer Nights!!), 1965	2:15
Total length:				45:37

Disc 2
No.	Title	Writer(s)	Original album	Length
1.	"Good Vibrations"	B. Wilson, Love	Smiley Smile, 1967	3:38
2.	"California Girls"	B. Wilson, Love	Summer Days (And Summer Nights!!), 1965	2:46
3.	"Sloop John B"	Traditional, arr. by B. Wilson	Pet Sounds, 1966	2:58
4.	"Barbara Ann"	Fred Fassert	Single version, Beach Boys' Party!, 1965	2:13
5.	"God Only Knows"	B. Wilson, Tony Asher	Pet Sounds, 1966	2:53
6.	"Wouldn't It Be Nice"	B. Wilson, Asher, Love	Pet Sounds, 1966	2:32
7.	"You Still Believe in Me"	B. Wilson, Asher	Pet Sounds, 1966	2:36
8.	"The Little Girl I Once Knew"	B. Wilson	Non-album single, 1965	2:38
9.	"Caroline, No"	B. Wilson, Asher	Pet Sounds, 1966	2:20
10.	"You're So Good to Me"	B. Wilson, Love	Summer Days (And Summer Nights!!), 1965	2:16
11.	"Girl Don't Tell Me"	B. Wilson, Love	Summer Days (And Summer Nights!!), 1965	2:21
12.	"Help Me, Rhonda"	B. Wilson, Love	Summer Days (And Summer Nights!!), 1965	2:48
13.	"Heroes and Villains"	B. Wilson, Van Dyke Parks	Smiley Smile, 1967	3:40
14.	"Wild Honey"	B. Wilson, Love	Wild Honey, 1967	2:39
15.	"Darlin'"	B. Wilson, Love	Wild Honey, 1967	2:14
16.	"Friends"	B. Wilson, C. Wilson, Dennis Wilson, Al Jardine	Friends, 1968	2:33
17.	"Bluebirds over the Mountain"	Ersel Hickey	20/20, 1969	2:53
18.	"Break Away"	B. Wilson, Reggie Dunbar	Non-album single, 1969	2:57
19.	"The Beach Boys Medley"	B. Wilson, Love, Christian, Fassert, Berry	Non-album single, 1981	4:08
Total length:				52:55

Disc 3
No.	Title	Writer(s)	Original album	Length
1.	"Do It Again"	B. Wilson, Love	20/20, 1969	2:19
2.	"Cottonfields"	Huddie Ledbetter	20/20, 1969	3:15
3.	"I Can Hear Music"	Barry, Greenwich, Spector	20/20, 1969	2:37
4.	"Tears in the Morning"	Bruce Johnston	Sunflower, 1970	4:08
5.	"Sail On, Sailor"	B. Wilson, Parks, Tandyn Almer, Ray Kennedy, Jack Rieley	Holland, 1973	3:19
6.	"Disney Girls (1957)"	Johnston	Surf's Up, 1971	4:07
7.	"Long Promised Road"	C. Wilson, Rieley	Surf's Up, 1971	3:34
8.	"Forever"	D. Wilson, Gregg Jakobson	Sunflower, 1970	2:41
9.	"Surf's Up"	B. Wilson, Parks	Surf's Up, 1971	4:12
10.	"'Til I Die"	B. Wilson	Surf's Up, 1971	2:38
11.	"Marcella"	B. Wilson, Almer, Rieley	Carl and the Passions – "So Tough", 1972	3:54
12.	"Student Demonstration Time"	Jerry Leiber, Mike Stoller, Love	Surf's Up, 1971	3:59
13.	"Lady Lynda"	Jardine, Ron Altbach	L.A. (Light Album), 1979	3:59
14.	"California Saga: California"	Jardine	Holland, 1973	3:22
15.	"Sumahama"	Love	L.A. (Light Album), 1979	4:29
16.	"Rock and Roll Music"	Berry	15 Big Ones, 1976	2:29
17.	"Here Comes the Night"	B. Wilson, Love	L.A. (Light Album), 1979	4:33
18.	"Kokomo"	Love, Scott McKenzie, Terry Melcher, John Phillips	Still Cruisin', 1989	3:37
19.	"Wipe Out" (with The Fat Boys)	Bob Berryhill, Pat Connolly, Jim Fuller, Ron Wilson	Crushin' (The Fat Boys Album), 1987	4:01
20.	"California Dreamin'"	J. Phillips, Michelle Phillips	Made in U.S., 1986	3:15
21.	"Fun, Fun, Fun" (with Status Quo)	B. Wilson, Love	Don't Stop (Status Quo album), 1996	3:11
Total length:				73:31

== Charts ==
Chart performance for The Platinum Collection
Chart (2005)	Peak position
Danish Albums (Hitlisten)	15
Dutch Albums (Album Top 100)	33
Swedish Albums (Sverigetopplistan)	8
UK Albums (Official Charts)	30

Chart (2024–2026)	Peak position
Greek Albums (IFPI)	11
