= Live in Sacramento 1964 =

Live album by The Beach Boys
- Released: December 2, 2014
- Recorded: August 1, 1964
- Venues: Sacramento Memorial Auditorium, California
- Genres: Rock, surf rock, rock and roll
- Label: Capitol
- Producers: Alan Boyd; Mark Linett; Brian Wilson (original recordings)

The Beach Boys chronology
Keep an Eye on Summer – The Beach Boys Sessions 1964 (2014)	Live in Sacramento 1964 (2014)	Beach Boys' Party! Uncovered and Unplugged (2015)

Professional ratings
Review scores
Source	Rating
AllMusic	3.5/5 stars

Live in Sacramento 1964 is a live album by The Beach Boys, released on December 2, 2014, exclusively through the iTunes Store. It was recorded in 1964, with some performances appearing on the band's first live album, Beach Boys Concert, in 1964.

== Background ==
The compilation's release was a result of revised European copyright laws, forcing some labels to publish unreleased archival material so that they would not lose their copyright. Live in Sacramento is one of two such releases by Capitol Records in 2014; the other was Keep an Eye on Summer.

== Track listing ==
First show

1. "Little Honda"
2. "Papa-Oom-Mow-Mow"
3. "The Little Old Lady from Pasadena"
4. "Hushabye"
5. "Hawaii"
6. "Let's Go Trippin'"
7. "The Wanderer"
8. "Surfer Girl"
9. "Monster Mash"
10. "Be True to Your School"
11. "Graduation Day"
12. "Surfin' U.S.A."
13. "Don't Back Down"
14. "Don't Worry Baby"
15. "Wendy"
16. "I Get Around"
17. "Fun, Fun, Fun"

Second show

1. "Concert Intro"
2. "Little Honda"
3. "Fun, Fun, Fun"
4. "The Little Old Lady from Pasadena"
5. "Hushabye"
6. "Hawaii"
7. "Let's Go Trippin'"
8. "The Wanderer"
9. "Wendy"
10. "Monster Mash"
11. "Surfer Girl"
12. "Be True to Your School"
13. "Graduation Day"
14. "Surfin' U.S.A."
15. "Don't Back Down"
16. "Don't Worry Baby"
17. "I Get Around"
18. "Encore: Papa-Oom-Mow-Mow"

Rehearsals

1. "Little Honda"
2. "Papa-Oom-Mow-Mow"
