= Sounds of Summer: The Very Best of the Beach Boys =

Sounds of Summer: The Very Best of The Beach Boys

Greatest hits album by the Beach Boys
- Released: June 10, 2003
- Recorded: 1962–1988
- Length: 74:39
- Label: Capitol

The Beach Boys chronology
| Good Timin': Live at Knebworth England 1980 (2002) | Sounds of Summer: The Very Best of The Beach Boys (2003) | The Platinum Collection (Sounds of Summer Edition) (2005) |

Professional ratings (original release)
Review scores
| Source | Rating |
|---|---|
| AllMusic | 5/5 stars |
| Encyclopedia of Popular Music | 4/5 stars |
| The Rolling Stone Album Guide | 3/5 stars |

Sounds of Summer: The Very Best of the Beach Boys is a greatest hits album of the American rock band the Beach Boys, released on June 10, 2003 by Capitol Records. The original collection was the most comprehensive single-disc compilation of the band's music, with 30 tracks including nearly every U.S. Top 40 hit of their career, except for "The Little Girl I Once Knew" (1965) and "It's OK" (1976).

On June 17, 2022, foreshadowing the band's 60th anniversary celebration, Capitol released an expanded three-disc edition of the compilation, including newly-remastered (and, in some cases, remixed) versions of the classic tracks.

== Release and reissues ==
Before Sounds of Summer: The Very Best of The Beach Boys, The Beach Boys had released compilations including Endless Summer (1974) and three Greatest Hits volumes: Volume 1: 20 Good Vibrations (1995), Volume 2: 20 More Good Vibrations (1999), and Volume Three: Best of the Brother Years 1970–1986 (2000). On the week ending June 28, 2003, Sounds of Summer both debuted and initially peaked at position number 16 on the weekly US albums chart (their highest peak chart position since 15 Big Ones in 1976), and initially stayed on the chart for 104 weeks. Currently certified triple platinum, The Very Best of The Beach Boys: Sounds of Summer was re-issued with a DVD component in 2004 with the regular edition remaining available.

In 2007, a follow-up album, The Warmth of the Sun, was released which contains other songs that were not included on Sounds of Summer.

In 2011, Mike Love stated, "Sounds of Summer: The Very Best of The Beach Boys is fast approaching selling three million copies – if it's triple-platinum, which is, you know, pretty good. And by the time this 50th celebration is over, it'll probably be more than triple-platinum."

The album was re-released on February 7, 2012 as the Celebration Merch Set which featured the original CD along with a T-shirt celebrating the band's 50th anniversary.

Following the death of Beach Boys co-founder Brian Wilson on June 11, 2025, Sounds of Summer: The Very Best of The Beach Boys soared up the US albums chart, attaining a new overall peak position of number 14 on the week ending June 28, 2025 in its 356th week on the chart (exactly 22 years from the date of its chart debut).

=== 2022 remix and remaster ===
A three-disc expanded edition of the compilation was released on June 17, 2022, as part of the band's 60th anniversary, and contains 50 additional (previously released) Beach Boys songs. The reissue was curated by Mark Linett and Alan Boyd.

The collection features 24 new mixes including two first-time stereo mixes, as well as 22 "new and improved" stereo mixes, based on a new digital stereo technology, allowing for a separation the original mono backing tracks for the first time. The new edition is available on three CDs or six vinyl records. All tracks from the original Sounds of Summer album were included in a new Dolby Atmos remix on the expanded Sounds of Summer.

In a perfect review for the reissue, Lee Zimmerman of American Songwriter said the effect of "leaving the listener breathless while experiencing ... seamless harmonies" was intensified by the "new stereo mix and the addition of lesser-known tracks", concluding that the collection could "never be bested." While Gillian G. Gaar of Goldmine did lament how a major expansion "undercuts Sounds of Summer’s original concept", she praised the new mixes, complementing the newfound freshness and clarity of the handclaps in "I Get Around" and the tambourine in "Help Me Rhonda" in particular. Gaar gave the reissue a score of four out of five stars.

== Track listing ==
=== 2003 – Original release ===
| No. | Title | Writer(s) | Original release | Length |
|---|---|---|---|---|
| 1. | "California Girls" (2001 Stereo Mix) | Brian Wilson; Mike Love | Summer Days (And Summer Nights!!), 1965 | 2:44 |
| 2. | "I Get Around" (Mono) | B. Wilson; Love | All Summer Long, 1964 | 2:13 |
| 3. | "Surfin' Safari" (Mono) | B. Wilson; Love | Surfin' Safari, 1962 | 2:05 |
| 4. | "Surfin' U.S.A." | B. Wilson; Chuck Berry | Surfin' U.S.A., 1963 | 2:27 |
| 5. | "Fun, Fun, Fun" (Mono Single Version) | B. Wilson; Love | Shut Down Volume 2, 1964 | 2:18 |
| 6. | "Surfer Girl" | B. Wilson | Surfer Girl, 1963 | 2:27 |
| 7. | "Don't Worry Baby" (Mono) | B. Wilson; Roger Christian | Shut Down Volume 2, 1964 | 2:47 |
| 8. | "Little Deuce Coupe" | B. Wilson; Christian | Surfer Girl, 1963 | 1:38 |
| 9. | "Shut Down" (2003 Stereo Mix) | B. Wilson; Christian; Love | Surfin' U.S.A., 1963 | 1:48 |
| 10. | "Help Me, Rhonda" (Mono Single Version) | B. Wilson; Love | The Beach Boys Today!, 1965 | 2:46 |
| 11. | "Be True to Your School" (Mono Single Version) | B. Wilson; Love | Little Deuce Coupe, 1963 | 2:08 |
| 12. | "When I Grow Up (To Be a Man)" (Mono) | B. Wilson; Love | The Beach Boys Today!, 1965 | 2:02 |
| 13. | "In My Room" | B. Wilson; Gary Usher | Surfer Girl, 1963 | 2:12 |
| 14. | "God Only Knows" (Stereo Mix from The Pet Sounds Sessions) | B. Wilson; Tony Asher | Pet Sounds, 1966 | 2:51 |
| 15. | "Sloop John B" (Stereo Mix from The Pet Sounds Sessions) | Traditional, arranged by B. Wilson | Pet Sounds, 1966 | 2:57 |
| 16. | "Wouldn't It Be Nice" (2001 Stereo Mix) | B. Wilson; Asher; Love | Pet Sounds, 1966 | 2:31 |
| 17. | "Getcha Back" | Love; Terry Melcher | The Beach Boys, 1985 | 3:00 |
| 18. | "Come Go with Me" | C.E. Quick | M.I.U. Album, 1978 | 2:05 |
| 19. | "Rock and Roll Music" (Album Version) | Berry | 15 Big Ones, 1976 | 2:27 |
| 20. | "Dance, Dance, Dance" (2003 Stereo Mix) | B. Wilson; Carl Wilson; Love | The Beach Boys Today!, 1965 | 2:00 |
| 21. | "Barbara Ann" (Mono Single Version) | Fred Fassert | Beach Boys' Party!, 1965 | 2:11 |
| 22. | "Do You Wanna Dance?" (Mono) | Bobby Freeman | The Beach Boys Today!, 1965 | 2:18 |
| 23. | "Heroes and Villains" (2001 Stereo Mix) | B. Wilson; Van Dyke Parks | Smiley Smile, 1967 | 3:38 |
| 24. | "Good Timin'" | B. Wilson; C. Wilson | L.A. (Light Album), 1979 | 2:12 |
| 25. | "Kokomo" | Love, John Phillips; Scott McKenzie; Melcher | Still Cruisin', 1988 | 3:35 |
| 26. | "Do It Again" (Mono Single Version) | B. Wilson; Love | 20/20, 1969 | 2:18 |
| 27. | "Wild Honey" (Mono) | B. Wilson; Love | Wild Honey, 1967 | 2:37 |
| 28. | "Darlin'" (Mono) | B. Wilson; Love | Wild Honey, 1967 | 2:12 |
| 29. | "I Can Hear Music" | Jeff Barry; Ellie Greenwich; Phil Spector | 20/20, 1969 | 2:36 |
| 30. | "Good Vibrations" (Mono) | B. Wilson; Love | Non-album single, 1966 (intended for Smile and later included on Smiley Smile, 1967) | 3:36 |
| Total length: | | | | 74:39 |

=== 2004 – Bonus DVD ===
DVD: Sights of Summer

1. "Surfin' U.S.A." (Live on the T.A.M.I. Show, 1964)
2. "I Get Around" (Live on the T.A.M.I. Show, 1964)
3. "Surfer Girl" (Live on the T.A.M.I. Show, 1964)
4. "Dance, Dance, Dance" (Live on the T.A.M.I. Show, 1964)
5. "Little Deuce Coupe" (Live from the Lost Concert, 1964)
6. "Sloop John B" (Promotional Video, 1966)
7. "Pet Sounds promo film" (1966)
8. "God Only Knows" (Live montage, 1967 & 1968)
9. "Good Vibrations" (Live on The Ed Sullivan Show, 1968)
10. "Do It Again" (Live on The Ed Sullivan Show, 1968)

=== 2022 – Expanded edition ===
Disc 1
| No. | Title | Writer(s) | Original release | Length |
|---|---|---|---|---|
| 1. | "California Girls" (2001 Stereo Mix) | Brian Wilson; Mike Love | Summer Days (And Summer Nights!!), 1965 | 2:44 |
| 2. | "I Get Around" (2021 Stereo Mix) | B. Wilson; Love | All Summer Long, 1964 | 2:13 |
| 3. | "Surfin' Safari" (2021 Stereo Mix) | B. Wilson; Love | Surfin' Safari, 1962 | 2:05 |
| 4. | "Surfin' U.S.A." (2021 Stereo Mix) | B. Wilson; Chuck Berry | Surfin' U.S.A., 1963 | 2:27 |
| 5. | "Fun, Fun, Fun" (2013 Stereo Mix) | B. Wilson; Love | Shut Down Volume 2, 1964 | 2:13 |
| 6. | "Surfer Girl" (2021 Stereo Mix) | B. Wilson | Surfer Girl, 1963 | 2:27 |
| 7. | "Don't Worry Baby" (2021 Stereo Mix) | B. Wilson; Roger Christian | Shut Down Volume 2, 1964 | 2:47 |
| 8. | "Little Deuce Coupe" | B. Wilson; Christian | Surfer Girl, 1963 | 1:38 |
| 9. | "Shut Down" (2021 Stereo Mix) | B. Wilson; Christian; Love | Surfin' U.S.A., 1963 | 1:48 |
| 10. | "Help Me, Rhonda" (2021 Stereo Mix) | B. Wilson; Love | Summer Days (And Summer Nights!!), 1965 | 2:46 |
| 11. | "Be True to Your School" (Mono) | B. Wilson; Love | Little Deuce Coupe, 1963 | 2:08 |
| 12. | "When I Grow Up (To Be a Man)" (2021 Stereo Mix) | B. Wilson; Love | The Beach Boys Today!, 1965 | 2:02 |
| 13. | "In My Room" (2021 Stereo Mix) | B. Wilson; Gary Usher | Surfer Girl, 1963 | 2:12 |
| 14. | "God Only Knows" (1996 Stereo Mix) | B. Wilson; Tony Asher | Pet Sounds, 1966 | 2:51 |
| 15. | "Sloop John B" (Stereo Remastered Mix) | Traditional, arranged by B. Wilson | Pet Sounds, 1966 | 2:57 |
| 16. | "Wouldn't It Be Nice" (2013 Stereo Mix) | B. Wilson; Asher; Love | Pet Sounds, 1966 | 2:31 |
| 17. | "Getcha Back" | Love; Terry Melcher | The Beach Boys, 1985 | 3:00 |
| 18. | "Come Go with Me" | C.E. Quick | M.I.U. Album, 1978 | 2:05 |
| 19. | "Rock and Roll Music" (2013 Stereo Mix) | Berry | 15 Big Ones, 1976 | 2:34 |
| 20. | "Dance, Dance, Dance" (2021 Stereo Mix) | B. Wilson; Carl Wilson; Love | The Beach Boys Today!, 1965 | 2:00 |
| 21. | "Barbara Ann" (2021 Stereo Mix) | Fred Fassert | Beach Boys' Party!, 1965 | 2:11 |
| 22. | "Do You Wanna Dance?" (2021 Stereo Mix) | Bobby Freeman | The Beach Boys Today!, 1965 | 2:34 |
| 23. | "Heroes and Villains" (2017 Stereo Mix) | B. Wilson; Van Dyke Parks | Smiley Smile, 1967 | 3:38 |
| 24. | "Good Timin'" | B. Wilson; C. Wilson | L.A. (Light Album), 1979 | 2:12 |
| 25. | "Kokomo" | Love; John Phillips; Scott McKenzie; Melcher | Still Cruisin', 1988 | 3:35 |
| 26. | "Do It Again" (2021 Stereo Mix) | B. Wilson; Love | 20/20, 1969 | 2:18 |
| 27. | "Wild Honey" (2021 Stereo Mix) | B. Wilson; Love | Wild Honey, 1967 | 2:37 |
| 28. | "Darlin'" (2021 Stereo Mix) | B. Wilson; Love | Wild Honey, 1967 | 2:12 |
| 29. | "I Can Hear Music" | Jeff Barry; Ellie Greenwich; Phil Spector | 20/20, 1969 | 2:36 |
| 30. | "Good Vibrations" (2021 Stereo Mix) | B. Wilson; Love | Non-album single, 1966 (intended for Smile and later included on Smiley Smile, 1967) | 3:44 |
| Total length: | | | | 75:05 |

Disc 2
| No. | Title | Writer(s) | Original release | Length |
|---|---|---|---|---|
| 1. | "All Summer Long" (2012 Stereo Mix) | B. Wilson; Love | All Summer Long, 1964 | 2:08 |
| 2. | "Good to My Baby" (2012 Stereo Mix) | B. Wilson; Love | The Beach Boys Today!, 1965 | 2:20 |
| 3. | "This Whole World" | B. Wilson | Sunflower, 1970 | 1:57 |
| 4. | "All I Wanna Do" | B. Wilson; Love | Sunflower, 1970 | 2:36 |
| 5. | "Disney Girls (1957)" | Bruce Johnston | Surf's Up, 1971 | 4:08 |
| 6. | "Kiss Me, Baby" (2012 Stereo Mix) | B. Wilson; Love | The Beach Boys Today!, 1965 | 2:44 |
| 7. | "Let the Wind Blow" (2017 Stereo Mix) | B. Wilson; Love | Wild Honey, 1967 | 2:34 |
| 8. | "Forever" | Dennis Wilson; Gregg Jakobson | Sunflower, 1970 | 2:44 |
| 9. | "Sail On, Sailor" | B. Wilson; Tandyn Almer; Van Dyke Parks; Ray Kennedy; Jack Rieley | Holland, 1973 | 3:18 |
| 10. | "Long Promised Road" | Carl Wilson; Rieley | Surf's Up, 1971 | 3:32 |
| 11. | "Cotton Fields (The Cotton Song)" (2020 Stereo Mix) | Huddie Ledbetter | 20/20, 1970 | 3:19 |
| 12. | "Pom Pom Play Girl" | B. Wilson; Gary Usher | Shut Down Volume 2, 1964 | 1:31 |
| 13. | "Wind Chimes" (Smile Version) | B. Wilson | Recorded 1966, intended for Smile (later re-recorded for Smiley Smile, 1967; original version released on Good Vibrations: Thirty Years of The Beach Boys, 1993) | 3:10 |
| 14. | "I Went to Sleep" | B. Wilson; C. Wilson | 20/20, 1969 | 1:40 |
| 15. | "Farmer's Daughter" | B. Wilson; Love | Surfin' U.S.A., 1963 | 1:50 |
| 16. | "Let Us Go on This Way" (2021 Mix) | B. Wilson; Love | The Beach Boys Love You, 1977 | 2:02 |
| 17. | "You Need a Mess of Help to Stand Alone" (2021 Mix) | B. Wilson; Rieley | Carl and the Passions – "So Tough", 1972 | 3:25 |
| 18. | "The Night Was So Young" | C. Wilson | The Beach Boys Love You, 1977 | 2:16 |
| 19. | "Marcella" (2021 Mix) | B. Wilson; Almer; Rieley | Carl and the Passions – "So Tough", 1972 | 3:45 |
| 20. | "You're So Good to Me" (2012 Stereo Mix) | B. Wilson; Love | Summer Days (And Summer Nights!!), 1965 | 2:15 |
| 21. | "Aren't You Glad" (2017 Stereo Mix) | B. Wilson; Love | Wild Honey, 1967 | 2:18 |
| 22. | "Baby Blue" (2021 Mix) | D. Wilson; Gregg Jakobson; Karen Lamm | L.A. (Light Album), 1979 | 3:24 |
| 23. | "It’s About Time" | D. Wilson; Bob Burchman; Al Jardine; C. Wilson | Sunflower, 1970 | 2:58 |
| 24. | "Do You Like Worms? (Roll Plymouth Rock)" (2021 Stereo Mix) | B. Wilson; Love | Recorded 1966, intended for Smile and later included on Good Vibrations: Thirty Years of The Beach Boys, 1993 | 3:34 |
| 25. | "Surf's Up" | B. Wilson; Parks | Surf's Up, 1971 | 4:14 |
| Total length: | | | | 69:42 |

Disc 3
| No. | Title | Writer(s) | Original release | Length |
|---|---|---|---|---|
| 1. | "Add Some Music to Your Day" (2000 Remastered Mix) | B. Wilson; Joe Knott; Love | Sunflower, 1970 | 3:34 |
| 2. | "It's OK" (Alternate Mix) | B. Wilson; Love | 15 Big Ones, 1976 | 2:11 |
| 3. | "Goin' On" | B. Wilson; Love | Keepin' the Summer Alive, 1980 | 3:03 |
| 4. | "San Miguel" (2021 Mix) | B. Wilson; Love | Ten Years of Harmony, 1981 | 2:21 |
| 5. | "The Warmth of the Sun" (2021 Mix) | B. Wilson; Love | Shut Down Volume 2, 1964 | 3:04 |
| 6. | "Everyone’s in Love with You" (2000 Remastered Mix) | Love | 15 Big Ones, 1976 | 2:43 |
| 7. | "All This Is That" (2012 Remastered Mix) | Jardine; C. Wilson; Love | Carl and the Passions – "So Tough", 1972 | 3:57 |
| 8. | "California Saga (On My Way to Sunny Californ-i-a)" (2012 Remastered Mix) | Jardine | Holland, 1973 | 3:23 |
| 9. | "Feel Flows" | C. Wilson; Rieley | Surf's Up, 1971 | 4:46 |
| 10. | "Wendy" (2013 Stereo Mix) | B. Wilson; Love | All Summer Long, 1964 | 2:20 |
| 11. | "Girl Don't Tell Me" (2012 Remastered Stereo Mix) | B. Wilson | Summer Days (And Summer Nights!!), 1965 | 2:20 |
| 12. | "Let Him Run Wild" (2007 Remastered Stereo Mix) | B. Wilson; Love | Summer Days (And Summer Nights!!), 1965 | 2:20 |
| 13. | "All I Want to Do" (Alternate Take, 2021 Mix) | D. Wilson; Stephen Kalinich | 20/20, 1969 | 2:13 |
| 14. | "Susie Cincinnati" (2021 Mix) | Jardine | "Add Some Music to Your Day" single, 1970 | 3:01 |
| 15. | "Vegetables" (2012 Remastered Stereo Mix) | B. Wilson; Parks | Smiley Smile, 1967 | 2:10 |
| 16. | "Time to Get Alone" | B. Wilson | 20/20, 1969 | 2:39 |
| 17. | "Where I Belong" (2000 Remastered Mix) | C. Wilson; Robert White Johnson | The Beach Boys, 1985 | 2:56 |
| 18. | "I Just Wasn't Made for These Times" (1996 Stereo Mix, 2012 Remastered Mix) | B. Wilson; Tony Asher | Pet Sounds, 1966 | 3:19 |
| 19. | "Little Bird" | D. Wilson; Kalinich | Friends, 1968 | 1:59 |
| 20. | "'Til I Die" | B. Wilson | Surf's Up, 1971 | 2:32 |
| 21. | "(Wouldn’t It Be Nice to) Live Again" | D. Wilson | (Recorded 1971); Made in California, 2013 | 4:37 |
| 22. | "Friends" | B. Wilson; C. Wilson; D. Wilson; Jardine | Friends, 1968 | 2:33 |
| 23. | "Devoted to You" (Party! Unplugged Sessions Version 2021 Stereo Mix) | Felice and Boudleaux Bryant | (Recorded 1965); Beach Boys' Party! Uncovered and Unplugged, 2015 | 2:21 |
| 24. | "Can't Wait Too Long" (2021 Mix) | B. Wilson | (Recorded 1968); Smiley Smile/Wild Honey, 1990 | 3:46 |
| 25. | "California Feelin'" (2021 Mix) | B. Wilson | (Recorded 1978); Brian Wilson solo version originally released on Classics Selected by Brian Wilson, 2002; 1978 Beach Boys recording originally released on Made in California, 2013 | 2:55 |
| Total length: | | | | 73:03 |

== Charts ==
Weekly charts

| Chart (2003–2026) | Peak position |
|---|---|
| Australian Albums (ARIA) | 37 |
| Canadian Albums (Billboard) | 28 |
| German Albums (Offizielle Top 100) | 24 |
| Irish Albums (Official Charts) | 33 |
| Italian Albums (FIMI) | 32 |
| New Zealand Albums (RMNZ) | 35 |
| Scottish Albums (Official Charts) | 24 |
| Swiss Albums (Schweizer Hitparade) | 46 |
| UK Albums (Official Charts) | 32 |
| UK Album Downloads (Official Charts) | 2 |
| US Billboard 200 | 14 |
| US Top Catalog Albums (Billboard) | 33 |
| US Top Rock & Alternative Albums (Billboard) | 48 |
| US Vinyl Albums (Billboard) | 22 |

Year-end charts

| Chart (2003) | Position |
|---|---|
| US Billboard 200 | 137 |
| Chart (2004) | Position |
| US Billboard 200 | 89 |
| Chart (2005) | Position |
| US Billboard 200 | 193 |
| Chart (2019) | Position |
| US Billboard 200 | 183 |
| Chart (2020) | Position |
| US Billboard 200 | 136 |
| Chart (2021) | Position |
| US Billboard 200 | 138 |
| Chart (2022) | Position |
| US Billboard 200 | 143 |

== Certifications ==
| Region | Certification | Certified units/sales |
|---|---|---|
| Canada (Music Canada) | Platinum | 100,000^{^} |
| United Kingdom (BPI) | Silver | 60,000^{^} |
| United States (RIAA) | 3× Platinum | 3,000,000^{^} |
^{^} Shipments figures based on certification alone.
