= Four by the Beach Boys =

EP by the Beach Boys
- Released: September 21, 1964
- Recorded: April 10 & 29, 1964
- Studios: Western, Hollywood
- Genre: Pop
- Length: 8:31
- Label: Capitol
- Producer: Brian Wilson

The Beach Boys chronology
| All Summer Long (1964) | Four by the Beach Boys (1964) | Beach Boys Concert (1964) |

Four by the Beach Boys (stylized as 4-By the Beach Boys) is the first EP by American rock band the Beach Boys, released September 1964 by Capitol Records. It consists of four selections from the album All Summer Long (June 1964). "Wendy" and "Little Honda" received enough airplay to enter the Billboard Hot 100. They peaked at #44 and #65, respectively. Four remains their only EP released in the United States (discounting the Holland bonus EP Mount Vernon and Fairway).

== Track listing ==
All tracks written by Brian Wilson and Mike Love, except "Hushabye" by Doc Pomus and Mort Shuman.

Side one

1. "Wendy" – 2:05
2. "Don't Back Down" – 2:00

Side two

1. "Little Honda" – 2:33
2. "Hushabye" – 1:53
