= All Summer Long (album) =

1964 album by the Beach Boys

Studio album by the Beach Boys
- Released: July 13, 1964
- Recorded: April 2 – May 27, 1964 (except "Drive-In", October 18, 1963)
- Studios: Western and Radio, Hollywood
- Genres: Teen pop; rock and roll
- Length: 25:10
- Label: Capitol
- Producer: Brian Wilson

The Beach Boys chronology
Shut Down Volume 2 (1964)	All Summer Long (1964)	Four by the Beach Boys (1964)

The Beach Boys UK chronology
Beach Boys Concert (1965)	All Summer Long (1965)	Surfin' U.S.A. (1965)

Singles from All Summer Long
- 1. "I Get Around" Released: May 11, 1964

All Summer Long is the sixth album by the American rock band the Beach Boys, released July 13, 1964 on Capitol Records. Regarded as their first artistically unified collection of songs, as well as one of the first true concept albums, it marked the Beach Boys' first LP that was not focused on themes of cars or surfing. Instead, the songs are semi-autobiographical and relate to the experiences of a typical Southern Californian teenager, a theme encapsulated by the title track, "All Summer Long", and the often-imitated front cover, a modernist style photo collage depicting the band members fraternizing with young women on a beach.

The album was recorded between April and May 1964 during the height of Beatlemania and the British Invasion. It was produced and largely written by Brian Wilson, who sought to raise the quality of his group's repertoire and sound following the disappointing results of Shut Down Volume 2. Also intended as a riposte to the Beatles, All Summer Long contained the band's most complex arrangements and refined vocal performances on a record to date. Among the included songs are "Wendy", "Drive-In", "Don't Back Down", and a rendition of the Mystics' 1959 hit "Hushabye".

Heralding the album era, All Summer Long reached number 4 in the US during a 49-week chart stay and yielded one single, "I Get Around", the band's first number-one hit in the US, cementing the group's sustainability in a market then dominated by British acts. To support the album, the group embarked on their first extended tour, playing about 70 shows over the course of the summer. A version of "Little Honda" by the Hondells became a top 10 hit, while "Girls on the Beach" later served as the theme for the 1965 film of the same name. In the UK, All Summer Long was issued in June 1965 and failed to chart. By then, it had been certified gold by the RIAA, indicating 500,000 units sold.

Wilson later cited All Summer Long as "a turning point" for the band, and his first LP that could compete against Phil Spector and the Beatles. Subsequent to this album, the Beach Boys rarely recorded songs about cars or surfing, but continued to be stereotyped as a group who exclusively sang about such subject matter, even as their musical sophistication continued to grow with such releases as The Beach Boys Today! (1965) and Pet Sounds (1966).

== Background ==
When I hear really fabulous material by other groups, I feel as small as the dot over the i in "nit." Then I just have to create a new song to bring me up on top. [...] That's probably my most compelling motive for writing new songs—the urge to overcome an inferiority feeling.

— Brian Wilson, 1964

Early in 1964, the Beach Boys completed their fifth album, Shut Down Volume 2, and embarked on their first tour of Australia and New Zealand, lasting from January 13 to February 2. The tour was highly successful, but led to the dismissal of their manager, Murry Wilson, who had frustrated the group with his overbearing practices and his disruptive behavior at recording sessions. Concurrently, the band were conscious of a new rival group, the Beatles, whose "I Want to Hold Your Hand" topped the U.S. charts on February 1. The Beach Boys' latest single, "Fun, Fun, Fun", then stalled at number five, with the Beatles occupying the top three positions. The fourth position was held by the Four Seasons, the act that most closely rivaled the Beach Boys before this point.

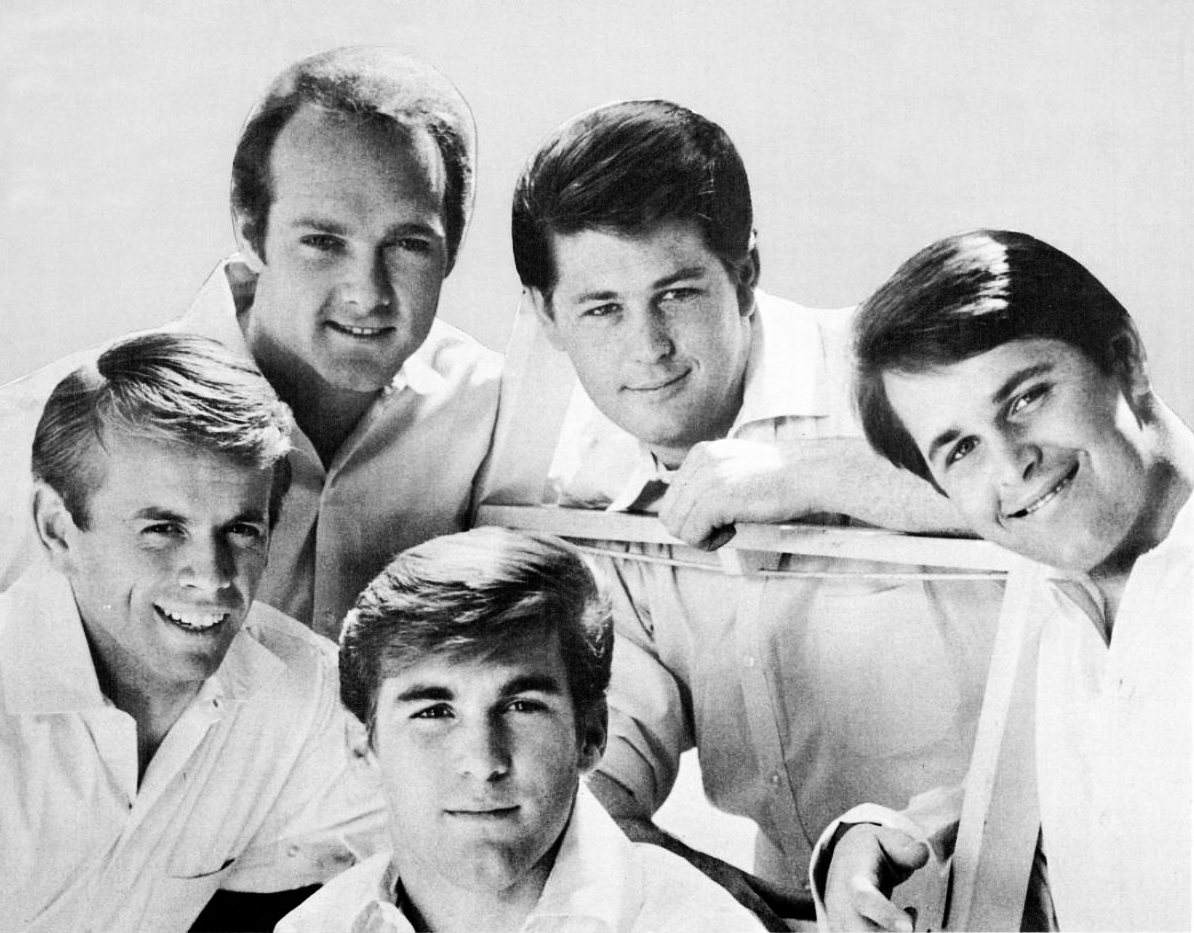
The Beach Boys in 1964. Clockwise from top left: Mike Love, Brian Wilson, Al Jardine, Dennis Wilson, and Carl Wilson.

By February 7, the British Invasion had officially commenced with the Beatles' arrival in New York City. Mike Love recalled, "To varying degrees, all of us in the Beach Boys were rattled, but most of all Brian [Wilson], who saw the Beatles as a challenge to his emerging position as a leader in pop music." Wilson said in a 1966 interview, "I knew we were good but it wasn't until the Beatles arrived that I knew we had to get going. [...] When we saw how everybody was screaming for the Beatles, it was like, 'Whooa!' We couldn't believe it. I was shook up as hell." His 1991 memoir, Wouldn't It Be Nice, states that he had "suddenly felt unhip [...] as if we looked more like golf caddies than rock and roll stars" and considered scrapping Shut Down Volume 2. After discussing the matter with Love, they concluded that competing with the Beatles in terms of public image was a pointless pursuit, leading them to concentrate their efforts on trying to outdo their rivals in the recording studio.

Capitol Records, whose roster included both the Beach Boys and the Beatles, responded the next month by rush-releasing Shut Down Volume 2, becoming the first Beach Boys LP to miss the top 10 since their second, Surfin' U.S.A. (1963). Moreover, the record company had begun allocating much of their marketing resources to the Beatles. Band promoter Fred Vail recalled, "The Beach Boys had been it for two years, but now people thought the Beatles were the future. And loyalties ran thin at Capitol. Now they didn't have to cater to Murry and the Beach Boys, and so they didn't." In the meantime, Wilson continued working freelance, writing and producing several singles for other acts, none of which became hits. (Note: This included "He's a Doll" by the Honeys, "She Rides with Me" by Paul Peterson, "I Do" by the Castells, "Endless Sleep" by Larry Denton, "Sacramento" by Gary Usher, and "Thinkin' 'Bout You Baby" by Sharon Marie.)

== Style and production ==
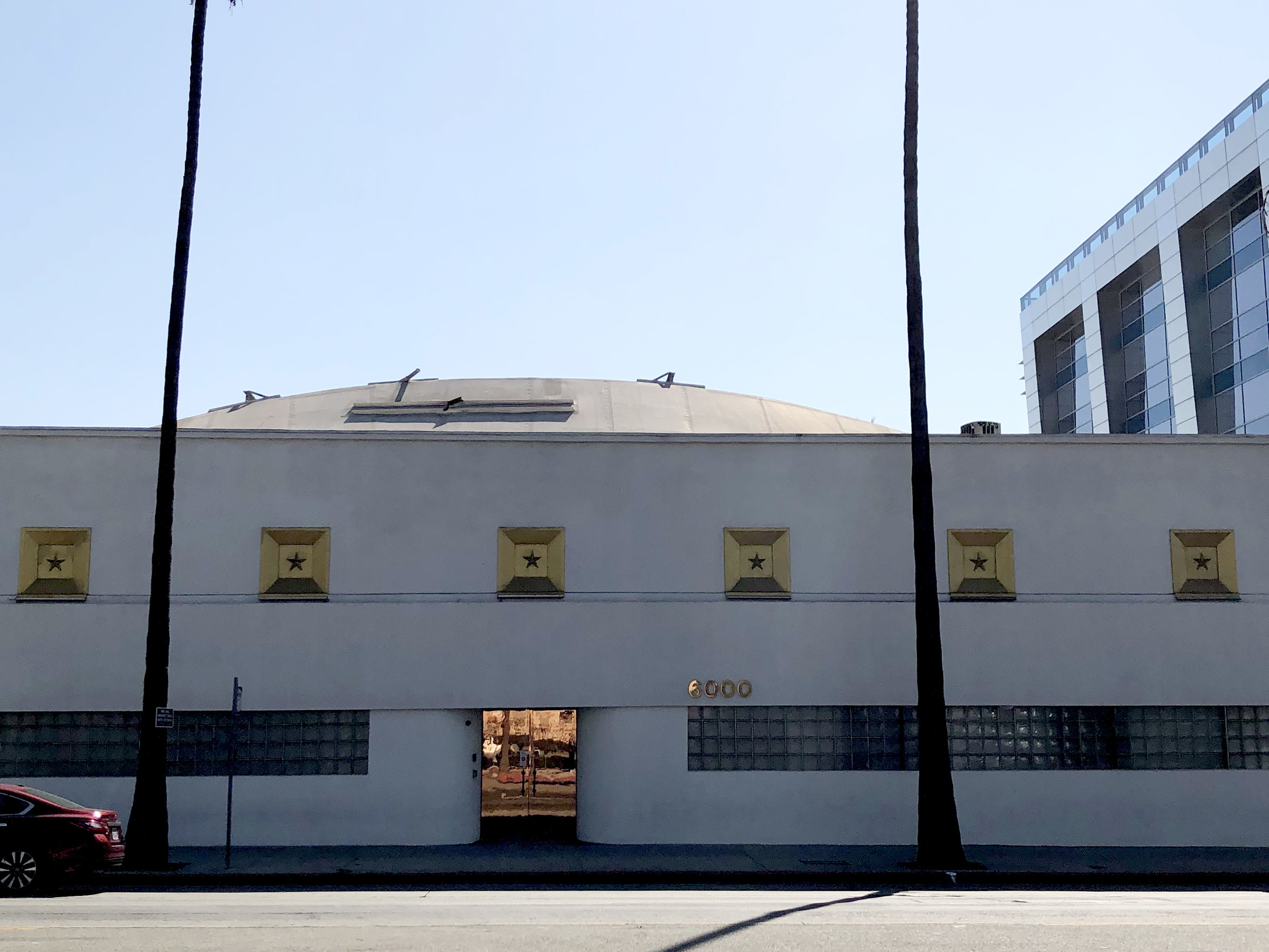
Entrance of Western Studio on Sunset Boulevard (2019)

All Summer Long was largely recorded between April 2 and May 27, 1964, at United Western Recorders in Hollywood. (Note: The only song that was not recorded in this timespan was "Drive-In" (the backing track was recorded on October 18, 1963 at Radio Recorders).) According to music historian Keith Badman, Wilson had been disappointed by the simplicity, reliance on filler, and overall rushed quality of Shut Down Volume 2, and endeavored for All Summer Long to be a more refined and sophisticated effort. The album marked the band's most complex arrangements on a record to date, as well as their first that was not focused on themes of cars or surfing. Wilson remarked, "We needed to grow. Up to this point we had milked every idea dry. We milked it fucking dry. We had done every possible angle about surfing and then we did the car routine. But we needed to grow artistically."

Academic Kier Keightley writes that All Summer Long consists of seven "up-tempo/dance numbers", four "ballads", and one "novelty sound collage", with subject matter ranging from "car and motorbike racing" and "teen romance" to "the consumption of mass media forms of entertainment" and "various other forms of summer fun". None of the songs are about cars (although one track, "Little Honda", is about a motorcycle), and the only reference to surfing is in "Don't Back Down".

Biographer Mark Dillon states that the album generally projects "a whole season of teenaged good times" with the exception of "a couple of numbers that threaten to kill the buzz", listing "We'll Run Away" and "Wendy". He goes on to describe the lyrical content as "the entire scrapbook [...] of mid-'60s SoCal teenage life", a theme that is reinforced by the front cover. Biographer David Leaf referred to the album as "more autobiographical" than previous records and "the first time the Beach Boys recorded a complete album about their own Southern California lifestyle." He suggested that the album qualified as one of "the first real concept albums".

Production-wise, the album introduced exotic textures to the band's sound as exemplified by the use of flute and marimba in the title track. The majority of the instrumentation was provided by the band members themselves, with Brian on piano, Carl Wilson on guitar, Al Jardine on bass guitar, and Dennis Wilson on drums. Studio musicians augmented their sound on select tracks. At Brian's behest, the group also spent many more hours than usual refining their vocal performances. Biographer Jon Stebbins writes,

On archive tapes we hear an exhausted Dennis imploring Brian to call it a day. "Sleep is very important," he ventures, but he is ignored and the taping continues. On the vocal overdubs for "Wendy," Brian is heard chastising Dennis for not reading the lyric properly. As another attempt is made at the song, Dennis snaps, "My brother was a teenage faggot!"

It was their last album for which Brian approved a true stereo master mix until Friends (1968). "Let's Live (Before We Die)", a discarded track, was released on the 2014 compilation Keep an Eye on Summer – The Beach Boys Sessions 1964. The compilation also included many alternate versions and session highlights of other tracks, sourced from the All Summer Long sessions.

== Content ==
=== Side one ===
"I Get Around" is an autobiographical song that describes the group's reaction to their newfound fame and success. Mike Love said that it was "really about our own experiences: how we had this instant fame, some fortune, had traveled all over the country, but did any of that bring us happiness? Maybe we needed to find a different kind of place." Biographer Peter Ames Carlin distinguished the song for its "jarring rhythmic shifts, fuzz guitar, off-kilter organ riffs, and Brian's own wailing falsetto", while Leaf called it "a major, revolutionary step in Brian's use of dynamics".

"All Summer Long"
Musicologist Philip Lambert highlights the title track, with its "jumpy rhythmic energy" and "interplay of vocal styles", as "a musical embodiment of everything good about a long summer filled with trips to the beach and 'miniature golf and Hondas in the hills.'"

"All Summer Long" encapsulated the album's general theme, with the lyrics offering a list of activities, events, and feelings associated with summertime. The line "Remember when you spilled Coke all over your blouse?" is a reference to Wilson's first meeting with singer Marilyn Rovell, his girlfriend at the time, although in real life, he had accidentally spilled hot chocolate on her. The song later became popularly known for its use in the ending credits of George Lucas's 1973 film American Graffiti.

"Hushabye", the album's only cover song, is a rendition of the Mystics' 1959 doo-wop standard, written by Doc Pomus and Mort Shuman.

"Little Honda" is about Honda-brand scooters, which are also mentioned in "All Summer Long" ("miniature golf and Hondas in the heat"). The song contains pioneering usage of guitar fuzz tone. It was briefly considered for release as a Beach Boys single. After Capitol voiced objections, Wilson gave it to his collaborator, Gary Usher, who produced a version that became a hit for the Hondells in late 1964.

"We'll Run Away" portrays a young couple wishing to elope while their respective parents warn them against such an impulse. It was the last song that Wilson co-wrote with Gary Usher for many years, and had likely been written in 1962. Leaf notes that the "church-like sound of the Hammond organ", heard prominently at the end, was an unorthodox application of the instrument on a rock record.

"Carl's Big Chance", recorded to showcase Carl's guitar-playing, is the album's only instrumental track and the final surf instrumental released on any of their studio albums. It serves as a companion piece to "Denny's Drums" from Shut Down Volume 2. Musicologist Philip Lambert speculates that the track was based on "Can I Get a Witness", a recent hit for Marvin Gaye.

=== Side two ===
"Wendy" portrays a man's dejection after discovering that the woman who he thought was his girlfriend was actually romantically involved with somebody else. Wilson, who later named his second-born child "Wendy", stated that the song was musically influenced by the Four Seasons. Leaf suggests that the song has "one of the most unusual introductions of any record from the rock era", making it "one of the most distinctive Beach Boys tracks ever."

"Do You Remember?" is a celebration of 1950s rock 'n' roll performers such as Little Richard, Chuck Berry, and Elvis Presley. (Note: Berry, whose "Sweet Little Sixteen" was reconfigured by Wilson into "Surfin' U.S.A.", is called "the greatest" among the rock 'n' roll stars.) It is essentially a revision of "The Big Beat", a song that Wilson had written and produced for Bob & Sheri in 1963.

"Girls on the Beach" is a ballad in a similar vein to Wilson's 1963 song "Surfer Girl", but more musically complex and sexualized. Stebbins cited the line "the sun in her hair / the warmth of the air", sung by Dennis, as "[o]ne of the most perfect uses of [his] sexy voice", and the closing block harmonies as "one of the group's finest moments". (Note: Carlin similarly writes of an "erotic" quality in the song, reflected "both in the lyrics and in the voices themselves, which fall, climb, and tangle languidly through a series of augmented chords with a loving intimacy that communicates all the passion simmering beneath the words." Lambert says, "'Girls on the Beach' is less romantic and more lecherous, sung about the girls but to the other guys.") The song later served as the theme to the 1965 Paramount Pictures film The Girls on the Beach, where the Beach Boys made a cameo appearance as themselves. Although the plot centered on the Beatles, the film featured scenes in which the Beach Boys lip sync to this song, "Little Honda", and the Surfin' U.S.A. track "Lonely Sea".

"Drive-In" was inspired by the group's outings at the Studio Drive-In in Culver City, California. The song gives the listener advice on how to enter a drive-in theater without paying for admission, among other things, and climaxes with a line alluding to contraception ("If you say you watched the movie, you're a couple of liars / And remember, only you can prevent forest fires"). During the filming of the 1995 documentary Brian Wilson: I Just Wasn't Made for These Times, director Don Was attempted to coax Wilson into discussing the unfinished album Smile. To achieve this, he approached Wilson by asking him what he considered to be "the heaviest work" that he had ever done. Wilson suddenly became excited by the question and proceeded to give vivid recollections of the tracking date for "Drive-In", which he considered to be the best record he had ever made. The footage was not used in the documentary.

"Our Favorite Recording Sessions" is a collage of outtakes and studio chatter culled from the album's recording sessions. According to biographer Timothy White, it distinguished itself from the similar Shut Down track "'Cassius' Love vs. 'Sonny' Wilson" by being "truly spontaneous. As such, it came closer than anything previously available to disclosing the Boys' taut tête-à-tête (Mike jesting edgily about throwing Brian across the room) as tensions in their relentless studio regime escalated."

"Don't Back Down" is the last surfing-themed song that the Beach Boys recorded during this early era of the band's history. Initial pressings mislabeled the title as "Don't Break Down".

== Packaging ==
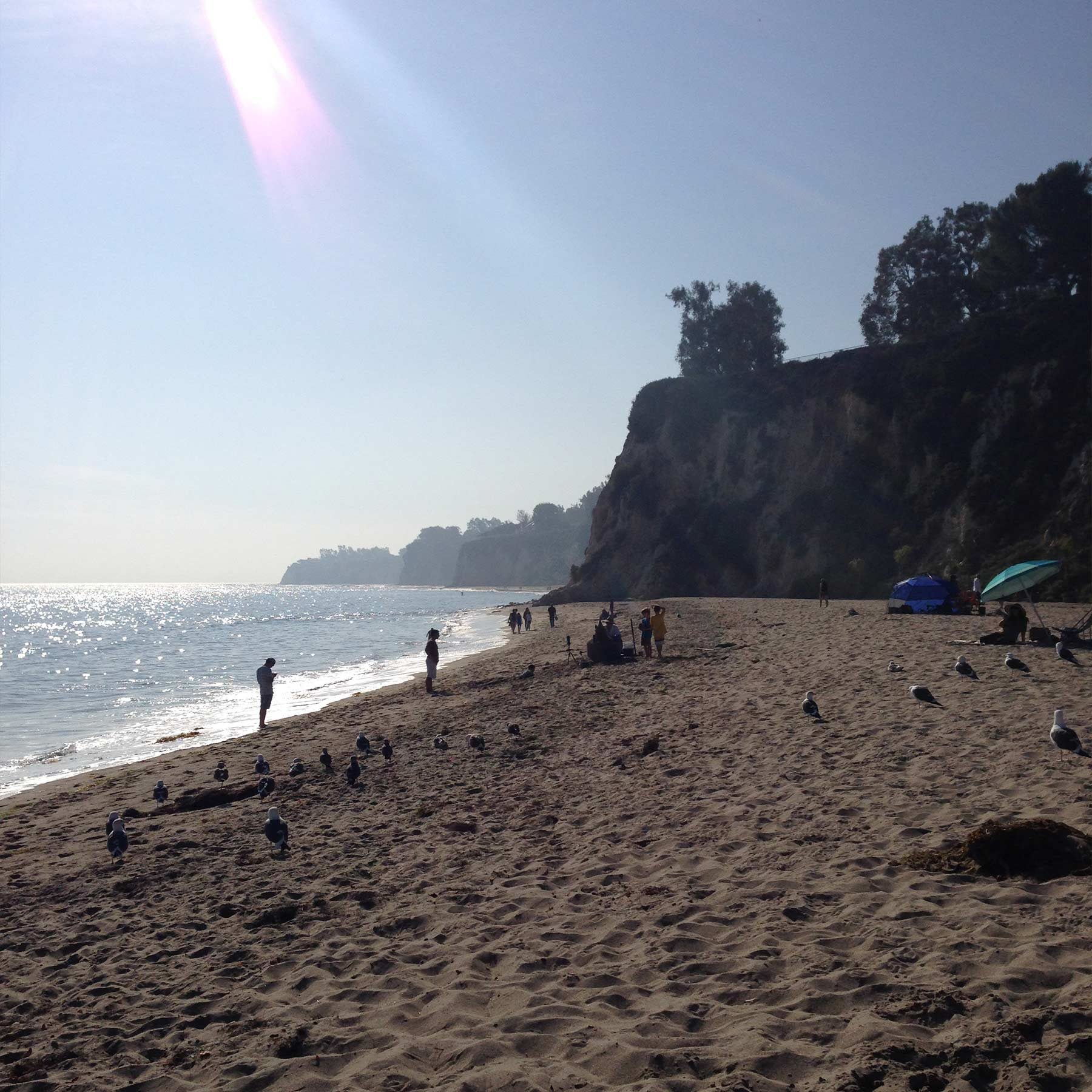
The photos on the album cover were taken at Paradise Cove in Malibu, California (pictured 2014)

The front cover of All Summer Long is a modernist style photo collage that depicts the band members fraternizing with young women on a beach. (Note: The women were two models who changed their clothes in between snapshots to appear as though there were more women on the beach than there actually were.) The photo shoot, conducted by Capitol art directors and photographers George Jerman and Ken Veeder, was held at Paradise Cove in Malibu, California, the same setting used for the cover photo of the band's debut album Surfin' Safari (1962). Dillon wrote in 2012 that the All Summer Long cover art remained "much imitated to this day", although Kieghtley notes that the design was itself heavily indebted to the work of visual artist Piet Mondrian. Music historian Luis Sanchez comments,

Unlike earlier album covers, Brian, Mike, Carl, Dennis, and Al look like a group of young men more at ease in their beach surroundings without the conspicuous surfboard or hot rod in the picture. They have fully grown into themselves as a group of individuals, appearing confident in the sort of way that makes you believe there is something about growing up in Southern California that defines a person's attitude toward the world.

The back of the sleeve included written comments from each of the band members. Dennis wrote: "They say I live a fast life. Maybe I just like a fast life. I wouldn't give it up for anything in the world. It won't last forever, either. But the memories will." Brian answered a frequently asked question about "how I come up with my ideas" by explaining that he drew inspiration from the "feelings" associated with common teenage experiences. He then remarked, “A sociologist might say I am trying to generate a feeling of social superiority."

== Release ==
=== Commercial performance ===
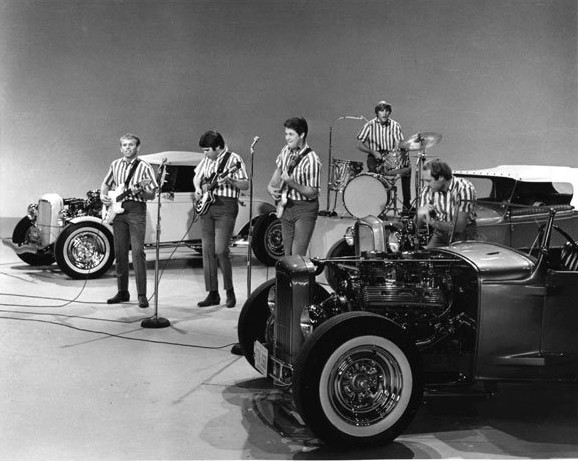
The Beach Boys performing "I Get Around" on The Ed Sullivan Show (September 27, 1964)

Lead single "I Get Around" was issued on May 11, 1964, and subsequently became the Beach Boys' first chart-topping U.S. hit, as well as America's first number-one hit by a native group since November 1963. (Note: Coincidentally, "I Get Around" made its entry at number one on the same day as America's annual Independence Day holiday.) In the UK, the single was released in June 1964 and reached number 7 on the Record Retailer chart – the band's first UK hit to breach the top ten. The single represented both a successful response by Wilson to the British Invasion, and the launch of an unofficial rivalry between him and the Beatles.

Released on July 13, All Summer Long debuted on the U.S. Billboard charts on August 1 and remained there for 49 weeks, peaking at number 4 on August 22. On September 21, Capitol issued the extended play record Four by the Beach Boys, a truncated version of All Summer Long that consisted of "Little Honda", "Hushabye", "Don't Back Down", and "Wendy". It sold at underwhelming volumes, charting at number 44.

All Summer Long was certified gold by the RIAA in February 1965. In the UK, the album was issued in June that year, accompanied in March by the single "All Summer Long", both of which failed to chart.

=== Touring and Beach Boys Concert ===
From July 3 to August 8, 1964, the Beach Boys embarked on a 36-date "Summer Safari" tour of the U.S., followed by a 30-date regional tour that lasted from August 21 to September 30. This was the band's first extensive tour, as their prior public appearances had been limited by the scholastic obligations of one or more members (Carl Wilson, the final hold-out in the group, graduated from high school that June). The setlists at these concert dates included three All Summer Long selections: "I Get Around", "Wendy", and "Little Honda". At least two concert reviewers referred to the Beach Boys as "America's answer to the Beatles". Every date was sold out, earning the group approximately $20,000 per show (equivalent to $208,000 in 2025). From the second summer tour alone, they grossed a total of $328,693 (equivalent to $3.41 million in 2025).

On September 27, the band made their first appearance on The Ed Sullivan Show, where they performed "I Get Around" and "Wendy". Two days later, the band concluded their tour with a performance at the Memorial Auditorium in Worcester, Massachusetts, however, the show was cancelled after 15 minutes due to fan bedlam that had surrounded the venue. Brian felt that audiences at Beach Boys concerts had become more uproarious as a result of the excitement that had been generated by the Beatles. He said, "[W]e'd do a concert and the kids would scream at us but we'd think, 'Hey, wait a minute. You're screaming for the Beatles through us.'"

In October, recordings from the band's August 1 performance at the Civil Memorial Auditorium in Sacramento, California were released as the live album Beach Boys Concert – their first LP to top the national charts. The album included only one All Summer Long track: "I Get Around. An expanded reissue, Live in Sacramento 1964 (2014), added performances of "Wendy" and "Little Honda".

== Critical reception ==
=== Contemporary ===
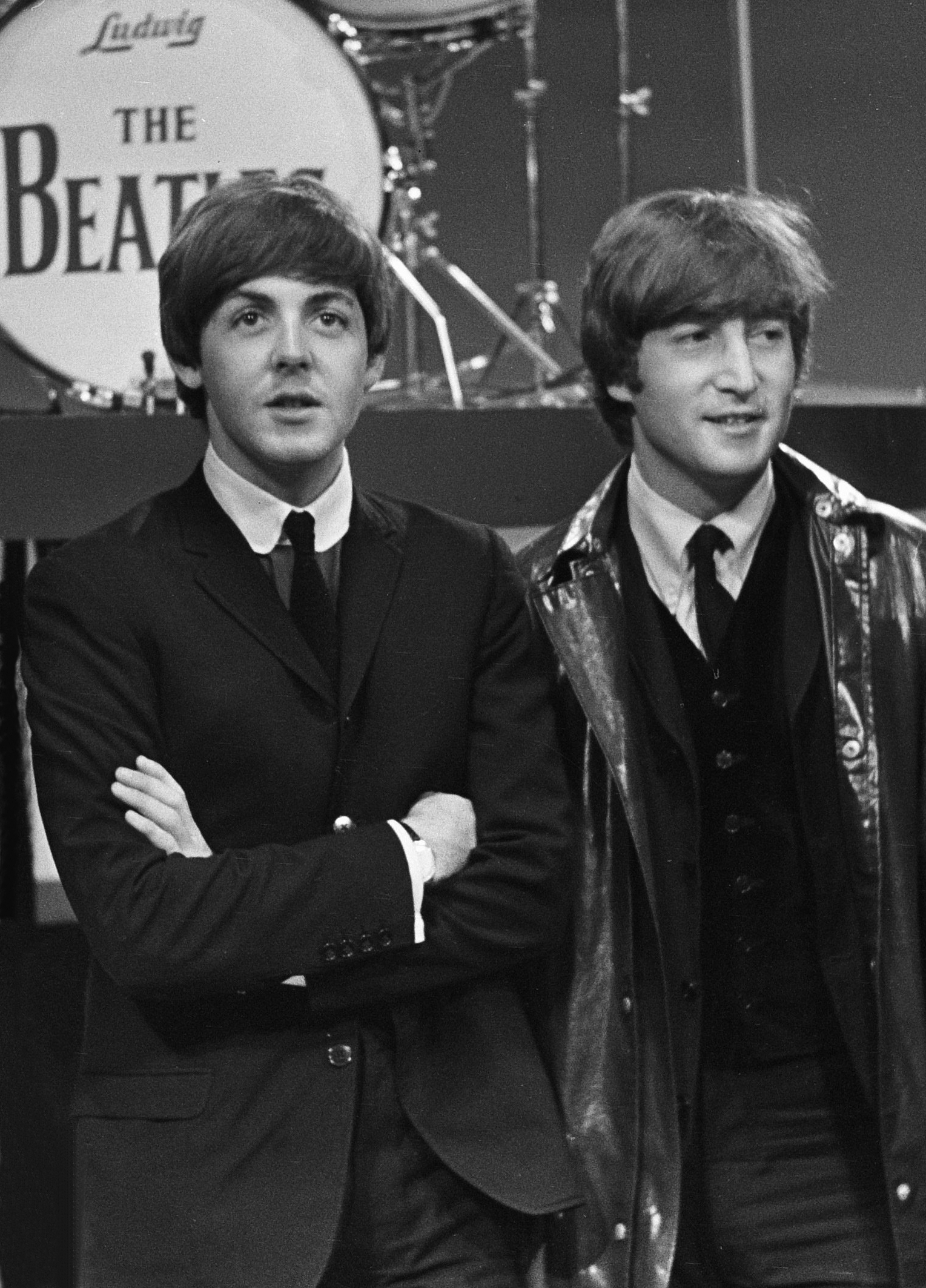
Paul McCartney and John Lennon were reportedly amazed by All Summer Long.

A reviewer from the magazine Record Mail wrote of the album, "With their surfing and high pitched harmony sounds they have become extremely distinctive along with some kooky lyrics". In Britain, NME's reviewer stated, "The Beach Boys are an acquired taste which I don't have, but at least they produce some solid 'beatful' sounds."

Actress Peggy Lipton told Teen Set that John Lennon and Paul McCartney had been "infatuated with the Beach Boy sound. [...] They played All Summer Long all night long and asked me many questions about them. Paul and John were fascinated by Brian’s style of composing and arranging."

=== Retrospective ===
Retrospective professional ratings
Review scores
Source	Rating
AllMusic	4/5 stars
Blender	3/5 stars
Encyclopedia of Popular Music	4/5 stars
MusicHound	3.5/5
The Rolling Stone Album Guide	2/5 stars
Sputnikmusic	4.5/5

AllMusic reviewer Richie Unterberger wrote that All Summer Long was the band's best album of the early 1960s, though he lamented the inclusion of "disposable filler" in the form of "Our Favorite Recording Sessions" and "Do You Remember?".

Icons of Rock co-editor Scott Schinder praised All Summer Long as an improvement over their previous LP and "the most consistent and satisfying Beach Boys album to date", affording highlights to the title track, "I Get Around", "Wendy", and "Don't Back Down". Mike Segretto, author of 33 1/3 Revolutions Per Minute: A Critical Trip Through the Rock LP Era, said that the album marked the point when the band "really entered the game" and delivered a "completely solid" album.

Among biographers, Jon Stebbins cited All Summer Long as one of the band's "strongest LPs ever". Mark Dillon opined that Wilson "took a Beach Boys album to new heights" and successfully "held his own against the Beatles", with "Our Favorite Recording Sessions" being the only weak track. In John Tobler's 100 Great Albums of the Sixties (1994), All Summer Long is praised for its "fine harmonies".

Luis Sanchez, author of the 33 1/3 book about Smile, wrote of All Summer Long, "None of the group's previous albums come close to the unity of vision and feeling they show here. [...] The brilliance of All Summer Long is in the way it enlarges the outlook of the group's brand of California pop to the point where genre labels seem unable to contain it."

== Impact and legacy ==
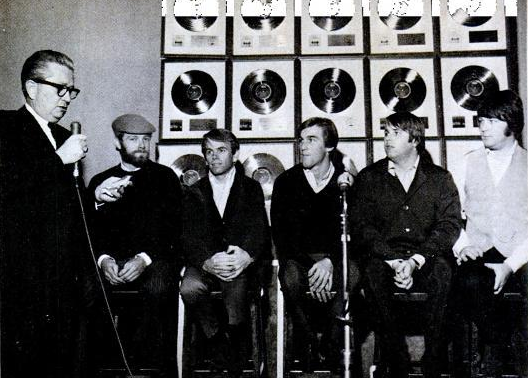
The Beach Boys accepting gold record sales certifications at the Capitol Tower (December 1966)

In the estimation of music historian Larry Starr, Wilson had entered "a period of aggressive experimentation" by mid-1964, and, by raising his creative ambitions with the Beach Boys, had established a successful career model that would itself be followed by the Beatles and other British Invasion acts throughout 1965 and 1966. Starr additionally writes that "I Get Around" and the Shut Down Volume 2 track "The Warmth of the Sun" reflected "the beginnings of a significant trend: namely, the increasing importance of album tracks, and eventually of albums themselves, in the development of adventurous popular music. Rock 'n' roll was on its way to becoming rock."

Wilson's 1991 memoir states of All Summer Long, "I finally felt the Beach Boys had put out an LP that was competitive with [Phil] Spector and the Beatles. The vocals were tight, the production was sharper and more inventive than anything we'd done previously. We were in a higher harmonic place and generally more exciting musically." His 2016 memoir, I Am Brian Wilson, calls it "a turning point for me and for the band—or maybe it makes more sense to say it's a turning point for how I understood how to write for the band."

Subsequent to this album, the Beach Boys rarely recorded songs about cars or surfing, but continued to be stereotyped as a group who exclusively sang about such subject matter. (Note: The band did not revisit these themes until the 1968 single "Do It Again".) Their 1965 release The Beach Boys Today! was their first album that completely avoided those subjects, and like All Summer Long, represented another leap forward in the group's musical sophistication, later to culminate with the 1966 album Pet Sounds.

== Track listing ==
All tracks are written by Brian Wilson and Mike Love, except where noted.

Side one
No.	Title	Writer(s)	Lead vocal(s)	Length
1.	"I Get Around"		Mike Love with Brian Wilson	2:14
2.	"All Summer Long"		Love with group	2:08
3.	"Hushabye"	Doc Pomus, Mort Shuman	B. Wilson with Love	2:41
4.	"Little Honda"		Love with D. Wilson	1:52
5.	"We'll Run Away"	B. Wilson, Gary Usher	B. Wilson	2:02
6.	"Carl's Big Chance"	B. Wilson, Carl Wilson	instrumental	2:03

Side two
No.	Title	Writer(s)	Lead vocal(s)	Length
1.	"Wendy"		Love with group	2:21
2.	"Do You Remember?"		Love with B. Wilson and Jardine	1:40
3.	"Girls on the Beach"		B. Wilson with D. Wilson	2:28
4.	"Drive-In"		Love with B. Wilson	1:49
5.	"Our Favorite Recording Sessions"	B. Wilson, Dennis Wilson, C. Wilson, Love, Al Jardine	audio vérité	2:00
6.	"Don't Back Down"		Love and B. Wilson	1:52
Total length:				25:10

Little Deuce Coupe / All Summer Long 1990/2001 CD reissue bonus tracks
No.	Title	Writer(s)	Lead vocal(s)	Length
13.	"Be True to Your School" (single version)	Wilson; Love	Love	2:10
14.	"All Dressed Up for School"	B. Wilson	Carl Wilson	2:24
15.	"Little Honda" (alternate take)	Wilson; Love	Love	2:13
16.	"Don't Back Down" (alternate take)	Wilson; Love	Love	1:39
Total length:				33:51

Notes

- Mike Love was not originally credited for "I Get Around", "All Summer Long", "Wendy", "Do You Remember?", "Drive-In", and "Don't Back Down". His credits were awarded after his songwriting credits lawsuit in 1994. Keightley states, "the fact that collaborators (including Love himself on 'Little Honda') were indeed listed on this LP in 1964 should give us pause when we read the songwriting credits on post-1994 releases that may seek to rewrite history."

== Personnel ==
Per John Brode, Will Crerar, Joshilyn Hoisington, and Craig Slowinski.

The Beach Boys

- Al Jardine – co-lead (8) and backing vocals (1-5, 7-10), spoken word (11), bass guitar (1-5, 7-9, 12), electric rhythm guitar (6), handclaps (1)
- Mike Love – lead (1-4, 7, 8, 10, 12) and backing vocals (1-3, 5, 7-9, 12), spoken word (11), handclaps (1)
- Brian Wilson – lead (1-3, 5, 7-9, 12), co-lead (10) and backing vocals (1-4, 7, 8, 10, 12), spoken word (11), grand (9) and upright pianos (1, 3-8, 10-12), harpsichord (1), Hammond organ (1, 4, 6, 7, 12), accordion (6), marimbas (2), handclaps (1)
- Carl Wilson – backing vocals (1-5, 7-10, 12), spoken word (11), electric lead and rhythm guitars (1-9, 12), 12-string acoustic guitar (5), handclaps (1)
- Dennis Wilson – lead (9), co-lead (4) and backing vocals (1-5, 7, 9, 10, 12), spoken word (11), drums (1-4, 6-9, 12), handclaps (1)

Session musicians (later known as "the Wrecking Crew")

- Hal Blaine – timbales with puili sticks (1), drums (5, 6, 10), kick drum (9, 12), tambourine (6), bell-tree (5), spoken word (11)
- Glen Campbell – electric guitar (10)
- Frank Capp – sleigh bells (10)
- Jerry Cole – acoustic guitar (10)
- Steve Douglas – tenor saxophone (1, 2, 8, 10)
- Jay Migliori – baritone saxophone (1, 8, 10), flute (2)
- Ray Pohlman – 6-string electric bass guitar (1, 6, 10)
- Leon Russell – grand piano (10)

Technical staff

- Bob (surname unknown) – engineer on "Girls on the Beach"
- Chuck Britz – engineer; spoken word (11)

== Charts ==
Chart (1964)	Peak position
Canadian CHUM's Album Index	2
U.S. Billboard Top LPs	4
U.S. Cash Box Top 100 Albums	4
U.S. Record World Top 100 LPs	3

== Bibliography ==
- Abbott, Kingsley, ed. (1997). Back to the Beach: A Brian Wilson and the Beach Boys Reader (1st ed.). London: Helter Skelter. ISBN 978-1900924023.
- Badman, Keith (2004). The Beach Boys: The Definitive Diary of America's Greatest Band, on Stage and in the Studio. Backbeat Books. ISBN 978-0-87930-818-6.
- Carlin, Peter Ames (2006). Catch a Wave: The Rise, Fall, and Redemption of the Beach Boys' Brian Wilson. Rodale. ISBN 978-1-59486-320-2.
- Dillon, Mark (2012). Fifty Sides of the Beach Boys: The Songs That Tell Their Story. ECW Press. ISBN 978-1-77090-198-8.
- Doe, Andrew; Tobler, John (2004). Brian Wilson and the Beach Boys: The Complete Guide to Their Music. ISBN 9781844494262.
- Fine, Jason (2004). Brackett, Nathan; with Hoard, Christian (eds.). The New Rolling Stone Album Guide (4th ed.). New York, NY: Fireside/Simon & Schuster. ISBN 0-7432-0169-8.
- Gaines, Steven (1986). Heroes and Villains: The True Story of The Beach Boys. New York: Da Capo Press. ISBN 0306806479.
- Keightley, Keir (2016). "Summer of '64". In Lambert, Philip (ed.). Good Vibrations: Brian Wilson and the Beach Boys in Critical Perspective. University of Michigan Press. ISBN 978-0-472-11995-0.
- Lambert, Philip (2007). Inside the Music of Brian Wilson: The Songs, Sounds, and Influences of the Beach Boys' Founding Genius. Bloomsbury Publishing. ISBN 978-1-4411-0748-0.
- Larkin, Colin, ed. (2002). The Virgin Encyclopedia of Popular Music, Concise (4th ed.). Virgin Books.
- Leaf, David (1978). The Beach Boys and the California Myth. New York: Grosset & Dunlap. ISBN 978-0-448-14626-3.
- Love, Mike (2016). Good Vibrations: My Life as a Beach Boy. Penguin Publishing Group. ISBN 978-0-698-40886-9.
- Perone, James E. (2015). "The Beach Boys". In Moskowitz, David V. (ed.). The 100 Greatest Bands of All Time: A Guide to the Legends Who Rocked the World. ABC-CLIO. ISBN 978-1-4408-0340-6.
- Rucker, Leland (1999). Graff, Gary; Durchholz, Daniel (eds.). MusicHound Rock: The Essential Album Guide. Farmington Hills, MI: Visible Ink Press. ISBN 1-57859-061-2.
- Sanchez, Luis (2014). The Beach Boys' Smile. Bloomsbury Academic. ISBN 9781623562588.
- Schinder, Scott (2007). "The Beach Boys". In Schinder, Scott; Schwartz, Andy (eds.). Icons of Rock: An Encyclopedia of the Legends Who Changed Music Forever. Westport, Connecticut: Greenwood Press. ISBN 978-0313338458.
- Segretto, Mike (2022). 33 1/3 Revolutions Per Minute: A Critical Trip Through the Rock LP Era, 1955–1999. Rowman & Littlefield. ISBN 9781493064601.
- Starr, Larry (2007) [2006]. American Popular Music: From Minstrelsy to MP3 (2nd ed.). New York: Oxford University Press. ISBN 9780195300536.
- Stebbins, Jon (2000). Dennis Wilson: The Real Beach Boy. ECW Press. ISBN 978-1-55022-404-7.
- Tobler, John (1994). 100 Great Albums of the Sixties. Woodstock, N.Y.: Overlook Press. ISBN 9780879515690.
- White, Timothy (1996). The Nearest Faraway Place: Brian Wilson, the Beach Boys, and the Southern Californian Experience. Macmillan. ISBN 0333649370.
- Wilson, Brian; Gold, Todd (1991). Wouldn't It Be Nice: My Own Story. New York: HarperCollins. ISBN 978-0-06018-313-4.
- Wilson, Brian; Greenman, Ben (2016). I Am Brian Wilson: A Memoir. Da Capo Press. ISBN 978-0-306-82307-7.
