= Sea of Tunes =

American music publishing company

- Status: Defunct (1969)
- Founded: 1962
- Founder: Murry Wilson
- Country of origin: United States
- Headquarters location: Los Angeles
- Publication types: Songs

Sea of Tunes was a music publishing company founded in 1962 by Murry and Brian Wilson. Murry was the first manager of the Beach Boys, the father of Brian, Dennis and Carl Wilson and the uncle of Mike Love. The intention of Sea of Tunes was to publish and promote the songs written primarily by Brian.

== Sale to Irving Almo Music ==
After the Beach Boys dismissed Murry Wilson as their manager in 1964, he continued to serve as their publisher. In July 1965, he sent a letter to Brian requesting sole ownership of the company per a verbal agreement that they had reached in 1962. According to historian Keith Badman, "Brian allowed Murry to take total control to stop his father's continual hassling on the matter."

In May 1969, Brian told the music press that the group's funds were so depleted that they were considering filing for bankruptcy at the end of the year, which Disc & Music Echo called "stunning news" and a "tremendous shock on the American pop scene." In August (or November), Murry sold Sea of Tunes to Irving Almo Music for $700,000 (equivalent to $6.15 million in 2025), believing that the catalog's value had peaked. Brian, according to his wife Marilyn Wilson, was devastated by the sale.

Mike Love wrote in his 2016 memoir that the group had signed away their rights to the songs under duress, and that in the late 1980s, it was discovered that the exchange was part of an elaborate plan orchestrated over two years by Abe Somer, the Beach Boys' lawyer. Somer concealed the fact that he was also Irving Music's lawyer, which was a conflict of interest. Over the years, the catalog would generate more than $100 million in publishing royalties, none of which Murry Wilson or the band members ever received. By 1994, the catalog was estimated to be worth $40 million ($86.9 million in 2025).

In the early 1990s, years after Murry's passing, Brian claimed fraud and sued for the return of his song copyrights. The suit suggested that Brian's signature may have been forged, "plus malpractice, misrepresentations, suppression of facts, breach of contract and conflicts of interest," making the sale illegal. While he failed to recover them in court, he was awarded $25 million in damages, including unpaid and underpaid royalties.

== Mike Love credits ==
Love v. Wilson
- Court: U.S. District Court
- Decided: December 12, 1994
- Defendant: Brian Wilson
- Plaintiff: Mike Love

Court membership
- Judge sitting: William J. Rea

Mike Love alleged that he was owed credit to 79 Beach Boys songs. Love explained that Murry had never credited him for many of the songs that he had cowritten with Brian, and therefore, he had not been paid royalties. Love said he "didn't know how badly I had been abused until I was deposed in Brian's pursuit of his claims against Irving Almo and Mitchell Silverburg and Nutt, which was the attorney representing the Beach Boys and Irving Almo. An inherent conflict of interest there." Love hoped that "we don't have to go to trial because it's going to destroy Brian. He's going to be destroyed in depositions, first of all, let alone getting him in court."

The parties were unable to reach a settlement, and Love filed suit against Wilson in 1992. After an eight-week-long trial and eight days of deliberation, Love won the case on December 12, 1994. The jury ruled that Love and Wilson were partners, that Wilson or his agents concealed material facts with the intention of defrauding Love, that they engaged in promissory fraud with respect to publishing credits and royalties and that Love was owed the 35 songs disputed. Love later called it "almost certainly the largest case of fraud in music history". He was subsequently awarded a cowriting credit to 35 songs that were published from 1962 to 1966, as well as $13 million.

Awarded credits

- "Chug-a-Lug"
- "409"
- "Farmer's Daughter"
- "Noble Surfer"
- "Finders Keepers"
- "Catch a Wave"
- "Hawaii"
- "Be True to Your School"
- "Custom Machine"
- "I Get Around"
- "All Summer Long"
- "Wendy"
- "Do You Remember?"
- "Drive-In"
- "Don't Back Down"
- "Little Saint Nick"
- "Santa's Beard"
- "The Man with All the Toys"
- "Merry Christmas, Baby"
- "Good to My Baby"
- "Don't Hurt My Little Sister"
- "When I Grow Up (To Be a Man)"
- "Help Me, Rhonda"
- "Dance, Dance, Dance"
- "Kiss Me, Baby"
- "She Knows Me Too Well"
- "In the Back of My Mind"
- "The Girl from New York City"
- "Amusement Parks U.S.A."
- "Salt Lake City"
- "California Girls"
- "Let Him Run Wild"
- "You're So Good to Me"
- "Wouldn't It Be Nice"
- "I Know There's an Answer" / "Hang On to Your Ego"

== Other disputed credits ==
- "Surfin' U.S.A." – Love alleged that he was owed credit for the song. His contribution was supported by Wilson in a 1974 interview.
- "The Little Girl I Once Knew" – Love alleged that he was owed credit for the song.
- "Wouldn't It Be Nice" – Love alleged that he was owed credits for additional parts of the song that he was not granted in the 1994 suit. Co-writer Tony Asher denied the claim, stating that Love was not present during the Pet Sounds songwriting sessions.

== Bootleg label ==
In 1997, a label named after the publishing company issued a slew of unauthorized bootleg recordings sourced from Beach Boys archives.
