= Beach Boys Concert =

Live album by the Beach Boys
- Released: October 19, 1964
- Recorded: December 21, 1963; August 1, 1964
- Venues: Memorial Auditorium, Sacramento, California (1963; August 1, 1964)
- Studios: Western, Hollywood (August 30)
- Genres: Surf rock, rock and roll
- Length: 32:07
- Label: Capitol
- Producer: Brian Wilson

The Beach Boys chronology
Four by the Beach Boys (1964)	Beach Boys Concert (1964)	The Beach Boys' Christmas Album (1964)

The Beach Boys UK chronology
The Beach Boys' Christmas Album (1964)	Beach Boys Concert (1965)	All Summer Long (1965)

Professional ratings
Review scores
Source	Rating
AllMusic	2.5/5 stars
Blender	2/5 stars
The Encyclopedia of Popular Music	2/5 stars
The Rolling Stone Album Guide	3/5 stars

Beach Boys Concert is the first live album by the American rock band the Beach Boys, released on October 19, 1964. It is their seventh album in all, and their third alone in the same year. It was their first of two chart-topping albums in the US (the other was their 1974 greatest hit compilation, Endless Summer), as well as the first live album to top pop music record charts, maintaining its position for four weeks during a sixty-two-week chart stay, and becoming another gold seller.

The album was recorded live at the Sacramento Memorial Auditorium in Sacramento, California, though it received heavy post-production treatment. Because Brian Wilson was about to vacate his position in the live group, and would only perform sporadically with them over the course of the next three decades, it is one of the few live documents of the original line-up of the Beach Boys that has been officially released.

In 2014, Live in Sacramento 1964 was released, containing additional performances from these concert dates.

== Recording ==
The album includes several songs that the Beach Boys regularly performed live but had not previously included on an album, such as "The Little Old Lady from Pasadena", "Long Tall Texan", "Monster Mash", "Papa-Oom-Mow-Mow", "The Wanderer", "Graduation Day", and "Johnny B. Goode". Alongside those were a sampling of their hits, such as "Hawaii", "Fun, Fun, Fun", and "I Get Around". "Little Deuce Coupe", "In My Room", "Johnny B. Goode" and "Long Tall Texan" dated from the December 21, 1963 show.

== Variations ==
A truncated version was released on Pickwick Records as Wow! Great Concert! Beach Boys Concert (Capitol (S)TAO 2198). When their albums were remastered for CD in 1990 (and again in 2001), Beach Boys Concert was paired on CD with Live in London, with bonus tracks from both periods.

== Track listing ==
Side one

1. "Fun, Fun, Fun" (Brian Wilson, Mike Love) – 2:26
2. "The Little Old Lady (from Pasadena)" (Don Altfeld, Jan Berry, Roger Christian) – 3:00
3. "Little Deuce Coupe" (Brian Wilson, Roger Christian) – 2:27
4. "Long, Tall Texan" (Henry Strezlecki) – 2:32
5. "In My Room" (Brian Wilson, Gary Usher) – 2:25
6. "Monster Mash" (Bobby Pickett, Lenny Capizzi) – 2:27
7. "Let's Go Trippin'" (Dick Dale) – 2:34

Side two

8. "Papa-Oom-Mow-Mow" (Carl White, Al Frazier, Sonny Harris, Turner Wilson Jr.) – 2:18
9. "The Wanderer" (Ernest Maresca) – 2:00
10. "Hawaii" (Brian Wilson, Mike Love) – 1:51
11. "Graduation Day" (Joe Sherman, Noel Sherman) – 3:29
12. "I Get Around" (Brian Wilson, Mike Love) – 2:42
13. "Johnny B. Goode" (Chuck Berry) – 1:56

Beach Boys Concert / Live in London 1990/2001 CD reissue bonus tracks

1. "Don't Worry Baby" (Brian Wilson, Roger Christian) – 2:57
2. "Heroes and Villains" (Brian Wilson, Van Dyke Parks) – 3:45

== Personnel ==
The Beach Boys

- Mike Love – vocals; saxophone on "Long Tall Texan" and "Let's Go Trippin'"
- Al Jardine – vocals, rhythm guitar; bass guitar on "The Wanderer"
- Brian Wilson – vocals, bass guitar; drums on "The Wanderer"
- Carl Wilson – vocals, lead guitar
- Dennis Wilson – drums; lead vocals on "The Wanderer"

== Charts ==
Chart (1964)	Peak position
US Billboard Top LPs	1

== Sources ==
- Beach Boys Concert/Live in London CD booklet notes, David Leaf, c.1990.
- Moskowitz, David V., ed. (2015). The 100 Greatest Bands of All Time: A Guide to the Legends Who Rocked the World. ABC-CLIO. ISBN 978-1-4408-0340-6.
- "The Nearest Faraway Place: Brian Wilson, The Beach Boys and the Southern California Experience", Timothy White, c. 1994.
