= Little Saint Nick =

Single by the Beach Boys
- B-side: "The Lord's Prayer"
- Released: December 9, 1963
- Recorded: November 6–7, 1963
- Studio: Western, Hollywood
- Genre: Christmas; hot rod rock
- Length: 2:00
- Label: Capitol
- Songwriters: Brian Wilson; Mike Love
- Producer: Brian Wilson

The Beach Boys singles chronology
"Be True to Your School" (1963)	"Little Saint Nick" (1963)	"Fun, Fun, Fun" (1964)

Music video
- "Little Saint Nick" on YouTube

Audio sample
- file; help

"Little Saint Nick" is a song by American rock band the Beach Boys first released as a single on December 9, 1963. Written by Brian Wilson and Mike Love, the Christmas song applies hot-rod themes to Santa Claus and his sleigh.

The single peaked at number 3 on Billboard magazine's special seasonal weekly Christmas Singles chart. Its B-side was an a cappella version of "The Lord's Prayer". In November 1964, an alternate mix of "Little Saint Nick" appeared as the opening track on The Beach Boys' Christmas Album.

== Background ==
"Little Saint Nick" was initially recorded on October 18 to 20, 1963, at Radio Recorders and Western Studio in Hollywood, but was soon scrapped in favor of a different version on November 6 to 7 in the style of "Little Deuce Coupe". The first version would later use the same backing track for "Drive-In". The idea for the song was partly inspired by record producer Phil Spector's plans to record a Christmas album. Wilson recalled: "I wrote the lyrics to it while I was out on a date and then I rushed home to finish the music." Some of its rhythm and structure derives from the group's "Little Deuce Coupe", also co-written by Wilson and released as a single six months earlier. Love was not originally listed as the co-writer of "Little Saint Nick". His credit was awarded after a 1990s lawsuit.

== Variations ==
"Little Saint Nick" reappeared on The Beach Boys' Christmas Album in 1964, with the stereo pressings of the album containing a new mix that removes the overdubbed sleigh bells, celeste and glockenspiel. This was done so that it would fit better with the sound of the album's first side, which was recorded in a hurry with basic instrumentation. Another version of the song, utilizing the melody and backing track later used for the All Summer Long song "Drive-In", was recorded, but remained unreleased until a 1991 CD reissue.

== Personnel ==
=== Single version ===
- Mike Love – lead and backing vocals
- Brian Wilson – backing vocals; grand piano; celesta
- Carl Wilson – backing vocals; electric guitar; sleigh bells
- Al Jardine – bass guitar; glockenspiel
- Dennis Wilson – backing vocals; drums

Additional personnel

- Murry Wilson – sleigh bells
- Bob Norberg – backing vocals

=== Album version ===
- Mike Love – lead and backing vocals
- Brian Wilson – backing vocals; grand piano
- Carl Wilson – backing vocals; electric guitar
- Al Jardine – bass guitar
- Dennis Wilson – backing vocals; drums

Additional personnel

- Bob Norberg – backing vocals

=== "Drive-In" version ===
Credits sourced from John Brode, Will Crerar, Joshilyn Hoisington, and Craig Slowinski.

The Beach Boys

- Mike Love – lead and backing vocals
- Brian Wilson – lead and backing vocals, upright piano

Additional musicians

- Hal Blaine – drums
- Glen Campbell – electric guitar
- Frank Capp – sleigh bells
- Jerry Cole – acoustic guitar
- Steve Douglas – tenor saxophone
- Jay Migliori – baritone saxophone
- Bob Norberg – backing vocals
- Ray Pohlman – 6-string bass guitar
- Leon Russell – grand piano

== Charts ==
Chart (1963)	Peak position
US Christmas Singles (Billboard)	3

Chart (2018–2025)	Peak position
Australia (ARIA)	39
Canada Hot 100 (Billboard)	23
France (SNEP)	158
Global 200 (Billboard)	34
Ireland (IRMA)	47
Latvia (DigiTop100)	84
Netherlands (Single Top 100)	98
New Zealand (Recorded Music NZ)	30
Sweden Heatseeker (Sverigetopplistan)	6
Switzerland (Schweizer Hitparade)	54
UK Singles (Official Charts)	43
US Billboard Hot 100	25
US Holiday 100 (Billboard)	22
US Rolling Stone Top 100	25

== Certifications ==
Certifications for "Little Saint Nick"
Region	Certification	Certified units/sales
New Zealand (RMNZ)	Platinum	30,000^{‡}
United Kingdom (BPI) Sales since 2004	Platinum	600,000^{‡}
United States (RIAA)	3× Platinum	3,000,000^{‡}
^{‡} Sales+streaming figures based on certification alone.
