= We'll Run Away =

Song by the Beach Boys

from the album All Summer Long
- Released: July 13, 1964
- Recorded: April 30 – May 18, 1964
- Studio: Western, Hollywood
- Genre: Doo-wop
- Length: 2:02
- Label: Capitol
- Songwriters: Brian Wilson, Gary Usher
- Producer: Brian Wilson

"We'll Run Away" is a song by the American rock band the Beach Boys from their 1964 album All Summer Long. Written by Brian Wilson and Gary Usher, the song is a doo-wop ballad in 12/8 time. The lyrics are about a young couple wishing to elope, and their respective parents are warning them against such an impulse.

== Recording ==
The song was recorded on April 30 and May 18, 1964 at United Western Recorders. Historian Andrew Doe notes that the initial April 29 date may have been erroneously labelled.

== Critical reception ==
Music journalist Nick Kent wrote that, with "We'll Run Away", Wilson and Usher "zeroed in" on a certain type of teen angst that would culminate more fully in Wilson's "Wouldn't It Be Nice". Jonny Abrams of Rocksucker wrote: "'We'll Run Away' is such a languid, pretty little thing that it’s easy to overlook but repeated listens reveal it to be the kind of innocently romantic pop marvel that so frequently punctuated The Beach Boys’ early output."

== Personnel ==
Credits sourced from John Brode, Will Crerar, Joshilyn Hoisington, and Craig Slowinski.

The Beach Boys

- Al Jardine - backing vocals, bass guitar
- Mike Love - backing vocals
- Brian Wilson - lead vocals, upright piano, Hammond organ
- Carl Wilson - backing vocals, electric guitar, 12-string acoustic guitar
- Dennis Wilson - backing vocals

Additional musician

- Hal Blaine - drums, bell-tree
