= Do You Remember? (The Beach Boys song) =

Song by the Beach Boys

from the album All Summer Long
- Released: July 13, 1964
- Recorded: May 6–18, 1964; United Western Recorders, Hollywood
- Genre: Rock and roll
- Length: 2:02
- Label: Capitol
- Songwriters: Brian Wilson, Mike Love
- Producer: Brian Wilson

"Do You Remember?" is a song written by Brian Wilson and Mike Love for the American rock band the Beach Boys, released on their 1964 album All Summer Long. The song is a minor rewrite of "The Big Beat", an earlier composition Wilson had written for Bob & Sheri in 1963. Both songs are tributes to 1950s rock and roll, referencing performers such as Buddy Holly and Hank Ballard.

== Composition ==
"Do You Remember?" was originally credited to just Brian Wilson. Mike Love's name was added as a result of a lawsuit filed by him against Wilson in the 1990s.

Byron Preiss called the song a "fractured history lesson". Musicologist Philip Lambert writes: "Mike and Brian's 'Do You Remember?' frankly commands us to make these connections, in the form of a rock-and-roll history lesson and demonstration. While mentioning key historical figures—Little Richard, Chuck Berry, and Elvis—they remind us of rock and roll as a cultural phenomenon, because 'the critics kept aknockin' but the stars kept a-rockin'."

== Recording ==
"Do You Remember?" was recorded on May 6 and 18, 1964 at United Western Recorders.

=== Personnel ===
Credits sourced from John Brode, Will Crerar, Joshilyn Hoisington, and Craig Slowinski.

The Beach Boys

- Al Jardine - co-lead and backing vocals, bass guitars
- Mike Love - lead and backing vocals
- Brian Wilson - lead and backing vocals, upright pianos
- Carl Wilson - backing vocals, electric guitars
- Dennis Wilson - drums

Additional musicians

- Steve Douglas - tenor saxophones
- Jay Migliori - baritone saxophones
