= Car song =

Song with car-related lyrics or themes

- Stylistic origins: 1900s: Popular music, dance, ragtime, march 1950s: Blues, doo-wop, rock and roll, rhythm and blues, soul, traditional pop 1960s: Rock, surf
- Cultural origins: Earliest forms emerged in the 1900s, United States; Fully developed in early 1950s, United States; Peak popularity achieved as "hot rod rock", in early 1960s, California, United States

A car song is a song with lyrics or musical themes pertaining to car travel. Though the earliest forms appeared in the 1900s, car songs emerged in full during the 1950s as part of rock and roll and car culture, but achieved their peak popularity in the West Coast of the United States during the 1960s with the emergence of hot rod rock as an outgrowth of the surf music scene. Though this popularity declined by the late 1960s, cars remain a frequently used subject matter in pop music into the 21st century.

== Origins ==
In the turn of the twentieth century, the recent invention of the automobile began to appear within popular music. Many of the earliest pieces had no lyrics, instead attempting to musically emulate the sounds of the automobile, such as "The Motor Car" (1903) and "The Auto Race" (1904). Dance, ragtime, and march compositions began emerging that, though wordless, were musically inspired by the automobile. Eventually, some of these songs took on words, such as Henry Krull's "Automobile Races". In 1905, Gus Edwards premiered the song "In My Merry Oldsmobile", a tune which Kenneth T. Jackson calls "the best-known car song ever written about the automobile."

== Full development ==
The car song began to emerge in full in the burgeoning rock and roll scene in the early 1950s. Jackie Brenston had a hit with "Rocket 88", attributed to Ike Turner, praising the Oldsmobile Rocket 88. Among the best known of the genre were "Hot Rod Race" by Arkie Shibley and His Mountain Dew Boys and the answer song "Hot Rod Lincoln" by Charlie Ryan. Although the Johnny Mercer song "Skylark" was actually released in 1942, it became the inspiration for the Buick Skylark that debuted in 1953. Many 1950s songs could serve as soundtracks to play in one's car when approaching a drive-in restaurant or meeting someone. "Walk Don't Run" by the Ventures, "Rumble" by Link Wray, or "Sleep Walk" by Santo & Johnny could all serve a slow entrance, "Let's Go for a Ride" by the Collegians, "You Can't Catch Me" by Chuck Berry, or "Rebel-'Rouser" by Duane Eddy worked for a more speedy approach, and "No Particular Place to Go" by Chuck Berry worked for all situations. Many groups emerged that took their names from car brands: the Impalas, the El Dorados, the Cadillacs, the Fleetwoods, the Starfires, the Rivieras, Little Anthony and the Imperials, among numerous others.

== Hot rod rock ==
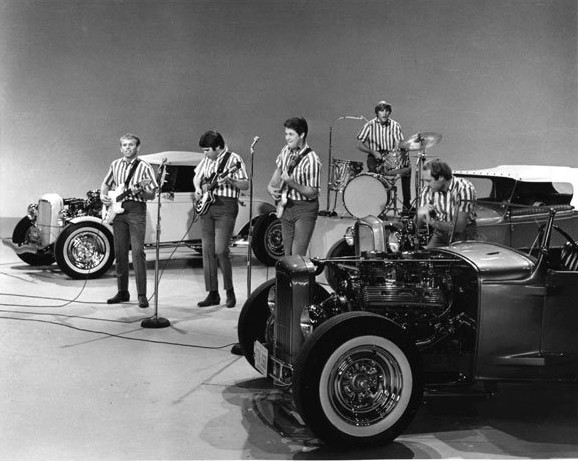
The Beach Boys performing in 1964

The muscle car craze, as well as the surge of interest in sports car racing, brought several cars referencing performance cars. The Beach Boys, already a highly successful rock band, tapped into the California cruising and drag racing culture, spearheading a short-lived rock music craze commonly referred to as "hot rod rock". Author Geoffrey Himes wrote "The music was only subtly different [from surf music]". According to The Ultimate Hot Rod Dictionary by Jeff Breitenstein:

While cars and, to a lesser degree, hot rods have been a relatively common and enduring theme in American popular music, the term hot rod music is most often associated with the unique 'California sound' music of the early to mid-1960s ... and was defined by its rich vocal harmonies, amplified (generally Fender brand) electric guitars, and youth-oriented lyrics (most often celebrating hot rods and, more broadly, surfing and 'girls'.

From 1961 to 1965, some fifteen hundred car songs were recorded. Alongside the Beach Boys, Jan and Dean, Ronny and the Daytonas, and the Fantastic Baggys all rose to the forefront of the scene. As in the 1950s, many groups adopted the names of car brands, but this time with a greater emphasis on hot rods, such as the GTOs and the T-Bones.

Some of the most popular car/motorcycle songs to emerge in this era include:

- "Stick Shift" (1961) by the Duals
- "409" (1962) by the Beach Boys
- "Little Deuce Coupe" (1963) by the Beach Boys
- "Shut Down" (1963) by the Beach Boys
- "Hey Little Cobra" (1963) by The Rip Chords
- "Drag City" (1963) by Jan and Dean
- "Fun, Fun, Fun" (1964) by the Beach Boys
- "I Get Around" (1964) by the Beach Boys
- "Don't Worry Baby" (1964) by the Beach Boys
- "Little Honda" (1964) by the Beach Boys, covered by the Hondells (also in 1964)
- "Custom Machine" (1963) by the Beach Boys, popularized by Bruce and Terry (1964)
- "Dead Man's Curve" (1964) by Jan and Dean
- "The Little Old Lady from Pasadena" (1964) by Jan and Dean
- "The Anaheim, Azusa & Cucamonga Sewing Circle, Book Review and Timing Association" (1964) by Jan and Dean
- "G.T.O." (1964) by Ronny and the Daytonas
- "Bucket 'T'" (1964) by Ronny and the Daytonas
- "Three Window Coupe" (1964) by the Rip Chords

== Later years ==
After the hot rod music period ended by the mid-1960s, car songs, though still frequent, did not enjoy the same level of popularity. Some key songs that have emerged since that era include the following:

- "Born to Be Wild" (1968) by Steppenwolf
- "Going Mobile" (1971) by the Who
- "Highway Star" (1972) by Deep Purple
- "Rockin' Down the Highway" (1972) by the Doobie Brothers
- "Sweet Hitch-Hiker" (1972) by Creedence Clearwater Revival
- "Motorcycle Mama" (1972) by Sailcat
- "Silver Machine" (1972) by Hawkwind
- "Autobahn" (1975) by Kraftwerk
- "Low Rider" (1975) by War
- "I'm in Love with My Car" (1975) by Queen
- "(I Live For) Cars and Girls" (1975) by The Dictators
- "Paradise by the Dashboard Light" (1977) by Meat Loaf
- "Cars" (1979) by Gary Numan
- "Trans Am (Highway Wonderland)" (1979) by Sammy Hagar
- "Warm Leatherette" (1980) by Grace Jones
- "Pull Up to the Bumper" (1981) by Grace Jones
- "Heading Out to the Highway" (1981) by Judas Priest
- "Little Red Corvette" (1982) by Prince
- "Panama" (1984) by Van Halen
- "Pink Cadillac" (1984) by Bruce Springsteen, covered by Natalie Cole (1988)
- "Rebel Without a Clue" (1986) by Bonnie Tyler
- "Rover 90" (2013) by Judge Smith
- "Vroom Vroom" (2016) by Charli XCX

== See also ==
- Teenage tragedy song

== Bibliography ==
- Alexander, Shana (November 6, 1964). Stolley, Dick (ed.). "Love songs to the carburetor". LIFE. Vol. 57, no. 19. Time Inc. p. 33. ISSN 0024-3019.
- Blair, John; McParland, Stephen J. (1990). The illustrated discography of hot rod music, 1961-1965. Oakland, California: University of California. ISBN 9781560750024.
- Breitenstein, Jeff. Ultimate Hot Rod Dictionary: A-Bombs to Zoomies. MotorBooks International. ISBN 978-1-61059-235-2.
- Bundy, June, ed. (October 23, 1961). "Artists' Biographies". Billboard. Vol. 73, no. 41. Billboard Publishing. ISSN 0006-2510.
- Cateforis, Theo (2011). Are We Not New Wave?: Modern Pop at the Turn of the 1980s. Ann Arbor: University of Michigan Press. pp. 173–181. ISBN 9780472034703.
- Walker, Clinton (2009). Golden Miles: Sex, Speed and the Australian Muscle Car. Adelaide: Wakefield Press. ISBN 9781862548541.
- DeWitt, John (2001). Cool Cars, High Art: The Rise of Kustum Kulture. Jackson: University Press of Mississippi. ISBN 9781604737752.
- Ferrandino, David (2015). Turner, Katherine L. (ed.). This is the Sound of Irony: Music, Politics and Popular Culture. Farnham: Ashgate Publishing. pp. 145–158. ISBN 9781472442611.
- Hoffmann, Frank W.; Bailey, William G. (1990). Arts & Entertainment Fads, Volume 1. Binghamton: Haworth Press. pp. 61–62. ISBN 9780866568814.
- Jackson, Kenneth T. (1985). Crabgrass Frontier: The Suburbanization of the United States. New York: Oxford University Press. ISBN 0-19-504983-7.
- Shuker, Roy (2012). Horn, David; Shepherd, John (eds.). Continuum Encyclopedia of Popular Music of the World. Vol. 8. New York; London: A & C Black. pp. 279–280. ISBN 9781441148742.
- Telgen, Diane (2006). Hillstrom, Kevin; Hillstrom, Laurie Collier (eds.). "Gilded Age Art and Literature". Automobiles, Mining and Petroleum, Textiles. Santa Barbara: ABC-CLIO: 205–258. ISBN 9781851097494.
