= The Mystics =

American rock and roll group

- Origin: Brooklyn, New York
- Genres: Rock and roll

The Mystics are an American rock and roll group that began in Brooklyn, New York, United States, in the late 1950s. The group was known as The Overons, a quintet that, when signed to Laurie Records, consisted of Phil Cracolici (born 1937, lead), Albee Cracolici (born 1936, baritone), George Galfo (born 1939, second tenor), Bob Ferrante (born 1936, first tenor), and Al Contrera (born 1940, bass). Under the direction of their manager, Jim Gribble, The Overons became The Mystics when each group member wrote a name they liked on a slip of paper and placed the papers in a hat; Contrera's choice was drawn.

In March 2015, the five original Mystics—Al Contrera, Albee Cracolici, Phil Cracolici, Bob Ferrante, and George Galfo—were inducted into the Doo Wop Music Hall of Fame in Cerritos, California.

== Biography ==
In late 1958, The Mystics recorded two songs for Laurie Records, "Adam and Eve", and the old Weavers tune "Wimoweh". Unhappy with the results, Laurie Records commissioned Doc Pomus and Mort Shuman to write an original tune for the group. Their first effort, the song "A Teenager in Love", however, was given to labelmates Dion and the Belmonts. Pomus and Shuman were instructed to come up with something else for The Mystics. The next day, the writers returned with "Hushabye". In May 1959, Laurie Records released "Hushabye" b/w "Adam And Eve" and within a few weeks the record was a hit. Soon Alan Freed started featuring "Hushabye" as the closing tune on his televised Saturday night Big Beat Show. At its peak, "Hushabye" was Top Ten in most of the tri-state area, spending nine weeks on the national chart that spring and summer, where it climbed to No. 20.

Gene Schwartz, head of Laurie Records, was visited by Mark Harris regarding a song of his recorded by another artist on the Laurie label. Gene showed him a stack of demos of songs rejected by The Mystics and asked him to write a song for the group's next recording session. Mark, still in high school, wrote "Don't Take the Stars" over the weekend and presented a demo to the company the following week. The group liked the song and recorded it the very same week. "Don't Take The Stars" hit the chart and became The Mystics' second hit after "Hushabye".

After Phil Cracolici left the group later part of 1959 their lead singers changed several times after that. Paul Simon (a.k.a. Jerry Landis), who frequently hung around Gribble's office, became The Mystics' new lead. In January 1960, "All Through the Night" (with five voices singing together with no distinct lead), "I Began to Think of You" and "Let Me Steal Your Heart Away" were recorded.

When Paul Simon left the group to pursue other projects, The Mystics chose John "Jay" Traynor, who later went on to form Jay and the Americans. On May 11, 1960, The Mystics with Jay Traynor on lead recorded "White Cliffs of Dover", "Blue Star" and "Over the Rainbow" at RCA Studios. Inspired by The Del-Vikings' version, they chose "White Cliffs Of Dover", a song they often sang at live shows long before recording it. Backed with "Blue Star", "White Cliffs of Dover" received only local play. "Over the Rainbow" remained unreleased until the late 1980s when Ace Records issued a Mystics album.

Eddie "Shots" Falcone became their next lead singer, and The Mystics recorded "Star Crossed Lovers" b/w "Goodbye Mister Blues", with Falcone singing lead. This record failed to chart and shortly thereafter, a young Ralph Lizano led the group with a song he had written called "Darling I Know Now". "Sunday Kind of Love" and "Again" also featured Ralph Lizano on lead. The first two songs, though released, received no airplay. "Again" was not released until the Crystal Ball LP.

In mid-1961, The Mystics stopped recording and performing. The nostalgia boom that began in 1969 brought the original five members back together and they began performing again on the rock and roll revival circuit. George Galfo and Bob Ferrante left the group after a few years, making the group the Cracolicis, Al Contrera, and new members Joe Esposito, Bruce Sudano, and Eddie Hockinson. Contrera was invited to California for a special project shortly thereafter; he declined, but sent Esposito. Sudano and Hockinson followed, and the three formed the group Brooklyn Dreams. Three new members came in: John Tarangelo (Johnny T), Joey Napoli, and Emil Stucchio. Stucchio is the original lead singer of The Classics, famous in their own right with their hit record "Till Then". The Classics and Mystics were acquainted, as they both came from Brooklyn.

By the early 1980s, the group was Phil Cracolici, Albee Cracolici, Al Contrera, and Johnny T. In 1982, Bob Ferrante was in town when the group was set to record an album, so he joined them. The album was Crazy for You for the Ambient Sound label. It featured re-recordings of three Overons original tunes: "Prayer to an Angel", "Why Do You Pretend" and "The Bells Are Ringing". That year, Ken Filmer joined the group. This quintet made up the Mystics until 1990, when Johnny T left the group.

In the late 1990s, the Mystics, the Classics and the Passions, who are all from the Bensonhurst section of Brooklyn and have been friends since the 1950s, started performing together in the Brooklyn Reunion Show. This act emphasized their common roots and longtime friendships, and the fact that each group scored successive hit records. The Brooklyn Reunion Show proved to be a popular act, recording and releasing a CD and touring for almost ten years.

Phil Cracolici and Ken Filmer were featured with the Brooklyn Reunion in the pledge breaks of Doo Wop 50 when the special was broadcast in May 2000. Al Contrera and Emil Stucchio were also featured with their current group, The Classics. Albee Cracolici later joined with his brother and Filmer, and the trio comprised the group in the early 2000s. This lineup with Al Contrera performed as The Mystics for another PBS special, Doo Wop Love Songs, filmed in 2007. Filmer and Albee Cracolici left the group in 2007, and Phil Cracolici performs with a new group.

In 2021, original founding member Al Contrera wrote the book; The Mystics, The Music and the Mob. (thehushabyebook.com) which outlines, in detail the definitive history of the Mystics.

== See also ==
- Alive N Kickin'
