= Larry M. Starr =

Academic administrator

Larry M. Starr (born 1948) is a consultant, academic administrator, university professor, and research scientist. His primary academic affiliation (since 2014) has been at Thomas Jefferson University in Philadelphia where he is Director of the Doctor of Management (DMgt) in Strategic Leadership program and Director of the Doctor of Philosophy (PhD) program in Complex Systems Leadership program. He is also managing director of Systems Wisdom a global consultancy which provides translational consulting, executive education, and research specializing in complex and seemingly intractable problems; and he is executive director of the Institute of Systems Wisdom an innovative social-academic-practice community. Starr's practice and research integrate cognitive and personality psychology, emergency and disaster medicine, and systems and design thinking. He is the principal author of the position statement, Automated External Defibrillation in the Occupational Setting, issued by the American College of Occupational and Environmental Medicine (ACOEM) released under the auspices of the ACOEM Council of Scientific Advisors.

== Education ==
Born in Toronto, Canada, Starr graduated from the University of Western Ontario in London with a B.A. in Psychology then earned an M.S. degree in Experimental Psychology from Villanova University, Villanova, PA in 1973. He earned a Ph.D. in Social-Organizational Psychology from the University of Windsor supported by a Doctoral Fellowship from the Canada Council Foundation, now the Social Sciences and Humanities Research Council of Canada. While a doctoral candidate he had a teaching appointment in the School of Management at Wayne State University in Detroit, and was a clinical psychology intern at the Ontario Hospital School for Retarded Children at Cedar Springs in Chatham-Kent, Ontario.

== Professional Activities ==
Between 1959 and 1965, Starr studied radio, television and theatre at the National Music Camp, now Interlochen Center for the Arts in Michigan and while participating in high school theatre competitions twice won the Sears Ontario Drama Festival Award. In college between 1966 and 1970, he was Executive Producer of the University of Western Ontario Drama Guild, now Theatre Western.

From 1979 until 1998 he created and was President of Oxygenics, Inc., in Ardmore, Pennsylvania, a medical equipment and training company. Between 1984 and 1998, he was Research Director for Oxygen Therapy Institute (OTI) a medical device manufacturer in Livonia, Michigan. From 1997 to 1998, he was Science Director for County Line Limited, in Solon, Ohio. In 1998 he sold Oxygenics, Inc. to SOS International which sold it to Complient Corporation in Cleveland, Ohio. From 1999 to 2001 he was Director of Medical Research and Education for both organizations. Complient was subsequently sold to Cardiac Science Corporation, a subsidiary of Opto Cardiac Care Ltd., Bengaluru, India. In 2013, he formed Systems Wisdom LLC, a consulting company, and the Institute of Systems Wisdom, an academic community, in suburban Philadelphia.

== Academic Appointments ==
In 1984, while maintaining his corporate roles, he received an adjunct professor appointment from Villanova University where he taught part-time until 2000 in the graduate program of Human Organization Science, and in the Departments of Psychology and Political Science. In 2001 he received an appointment to create and direct a Master of Science in Organizational Development and Leadership program at the Philadelphia College of Osteopathic Medicine a freestanding medical school in Philadelphia, PA. In 2002 he received an appointment to be executive director and Senior Scholar in the Organizational Dynamics Graduate Studies Program at the University of Pennsylvania where he remained until he retired in May 2014. In July 2014 he received a faculty appointment from Philadelphia University to design a professional research doctorate in strategic leadership following which he was appointed Director. Following the integration of Philadelphia University with Thomas Jefferson University, he designed a PhD program in Complex Systems Leadership which was approved in April 2019 and for which he was also appointed Director.

== Research and Scholarship ==
Starr has published and presented more than 150 scholarly documents including books, book chapters, academic papers, training films, and conference papers on a wide range of topics including education and test construction, conspiracy perception, decision making, ethics and moral behavior, leadership, organizational coaching, emergency oxygen equipment, first aid and cardiopulmonary resuscitation, automated external defibrillation, hazardous materials emergency planning, and personality and chocolate. He has been a funded researcher for the American Heart Association and author of health education and training materials for the National Safety Council. For his contributions to the American College of Occupational and Environmental Medicine, the professional society specializing in the branch of clinical medicine most active in the field of Occupational Health, he was awarded the 2002 Meritorious Service Award, the only non-physician to receive this in the college's history. He also holds a copyright for the “Control of Anxiety in Lifesaving Method (CALM)” © a technique that blends stress management with emergency care training and responding. Since 2004, he has been studying and writing about the application of systems and design thinking to complex organization problems. To support this, he and colleagues established a multi-disciplinary, multi-institution collaborative research and practice community, the Special Task Force on Reframing the System of Survival for Sudden Cardiac Arrest.
