= All Dressed Up for School =

Song by the Beach Boys

from the album Little Deuce Coupe/All Summer Long
- Released: 1990
- Recorded: September 16, 1964
- Studio: United Western Recorders, Hollywood
- Genre: Rock
- Length: 2:20
- Label: Capitol
- Songwriter: Brian Wilson
- Producer: Brian Wilson

"All Dressed Up for School" is a song by American rock band the Beach Boys that was recorded in 1964 during the early sessions for their album The Beach Boys Today!. Written by Brian Wilson, the lyrics express the narrator's newfound fascination with a girl after realizing "what a turn on" she is in school clothes. It is one of the last original tracks the group recorded as a small ensemble rock band before entering their orchestral phase.

== Composition ==
"All Dressed Up for School" started life as a song called "What Will I Wear to School (Today)", a song which was written in early 1964 for Sharon Marie (a friend of Mike Love's) but never recorded. According to author Keith Badman, this version of the song featured lyrics that were partly written by Roger Christian, a frequent writing collaborator of Brian Wilson's.

Parts of the melody of "All Dressed Up for School" would be reused by Brian Wilson in "I Just Got My Pay", an outtake from 1970's Sunflower, which was released in 1993 on the box set. The chords in the opening a capella vocal passage would later show up in unreleased versions of "Heroes and Villains", and later in the 1980 single "Goin' On".

Musicologist Philip Lambert described the track as "packed with musical invention" and said that the lyrics are "interesting" despite being "unsuitable for release in 1964." Author Andrew Hickey described the song as "absolutely astonishing" musically, but likewise acknowledged the problematic nature of its lyrics.

== Recording ==
The song was recorded on September 16, 1964, at Western Studios, with Chuck Britz as the engineer. For its release in 1990, it was mixed by Mark Linett.

== Personnel ==
Track details per session archivist Craig Slowinski.

The Beach Boys

- Al Jardine – electric bass guitar, harmony and backing vocals, handclaps
- Mike Love – harmony and backing vocals, handclaps
- Brian Wilson – piano, harmony and backing vocals, handclaps
- Carl Wilson – electric 12-string lead guitar, rhythm guitar, lead vocal, handclaps
- Dennis Wilson – drum kit, vocals, handclaps

Additional musicians and staff

- Steve Douglas – tenor saxophone
- Carl L. Fortina – accordion
- Melvin Pollan – double bass
- Jimmy Bond – double bass
- Lyle Ritz – double bass
- Chuck Britz – engineer

== See also ==
- "Hey Little Tomboy"
- "Smart Girls"
