= The Collegians =

American doo-wop group

The Collegians were an American 1950s doo-wop group from New York City. They recorded for the Harlem-based record producer, Paul Winley.

The group's biggest hit, "Zoom Zoom Zoom," was released in 1958. Other Collegians' charted hits include "Right Around The Corner," "The One You Love," "Hold Back the Night," and "Let's Go For a Ride."

The Marcels later used the intro to "Zoom Zoom Zoom" as the intro to their 1961 smash hit "Blue Moon."
