= Girls on the Beach =

Song by the Beach Boys

from the album All Summer Long
- Released: July 13, 1964
- Recorded: April 10 – May 19, 1964
- Studio: Western, Hollywood
- Length: 2:24
- Label: Capitol
- Songwriters: Brian Wilson, Mike Love
- Producer: Brian Wilson

"Girls on the Beach" is a song by the American rock band the Beach Boys from their 1964 album All Summer Long. Written by Brian Wilson and Mike Love, the song is in the vein of the band's previous surf ballads and features Four Freshmen-inspired harmonies. The song also served as the title track to the movie The Girls on the Beach.

== Background and style ==
"Girls on the Beach" was written by Brian Wilson, whose 2016 memoir, I Am Brian Wilson, described it as "our last real surf-type song." It is a ballad in a similar vein to Wilson's 1963 song "Surfer Girl", but more musically complex and sexualized. Musicologist Philip Lambert notes the influence of the Four Freshmen on the song's vocal arrangement.

Biographer Peter Ames Carlin writes of an "erotic" quality in the song, reflected "both in the lyrics and in the voices themselves, which fall, climb, and tangle languidly through a series of augmented chords with a loving intimacy that communicates all the passion simmering beneath the words." Lambert says, "'Girls on the Beach' is less romantic and more lecherous, sung about the girls but to the other guys."

== Recording ==
The vocals for "Girls on the Beach" were recorded on April 10, 1964 at United Western Recorders, while the backing track had been done at an undocumented date at Gold Star Studios. A later session date for May 19 was for a completely different arrangement, with a celeste and lead vocals from Mike, which never were properly finished.

=== Personnel ===
Credits sourced from John Brode, Will Crerar, Joshilyn Hoisington, and Craig Slowinski.

The Beach Boys

- Al Jardine - harmony and backing vocals, bass guitar
- Mike Love - harmony and backing vocals
- Brian Wilson - lead vocals, grand piano
- Carl Wilson - harmony and backing vocals, electric guitar
- Dennis Wilson - bridge lead, harmony and backing vocals, drums

Additional musician

- Hal Blaine - kick drum

== Release ==
In addition to appearing on the band's 1964 album, All Summer Long, the song featured as the title track to the surf movie The Girls on the Beach, filmed in April 1964 and featuring performances by the band. In the film, the band performed "The Girls on the Beach", "Little Honda", and "Lonely Sea".

== Critical reception ==
Writing retrospectively for AllMusic, critic Richie Unterberger described the song as a "sumptuous ballad" and a "relatively little-known treasure," also noting that the song features "some of their best early harmonizing."

Dennis Wilson sang lead on the song's middle eight; brother Brian later commented, "Dennis does a nice job on the bridge". Biographer Jon Stebbins praised Dennis's line "the sun in her hair / the warmth of the air" as "[o]ne of the most perfect uses of [his] sexy voice", and the closing block harmonies as "one of the group's finest moments". In addition, he notes that the song "shows off Brian's incredible vocal-arranging skill, with complex group blends and multiple key changes".

== Bibliography ==
- Badman, Keith (2004). The Beach Boys: The Definitive Diary of America's Greatest Band, on Stage and in the Studio. Backbeat Books. ISBN 978-0-87930-818-6.
- Carlin, Peter Ames (2006). Catch a Wave: The Rise, Fall, and Redemption of the Beach Boys' Brian Wilson. Rodale. ISBN 978-1-59486-320-2.
- Lambert, Philip (2007). Inside the Music of Brian Wilson: The Songs, Sounds, and Influences of the Beach Boys' Founding Genius. Bloomsbury Publishing. ISBN 978-1-4411-0748-0.
- Stebbins, Jon (2000). Dennis Wilson: The Real Beach Boy. ECW Press. ISBN 978-1-55022-404-7.
- White, Timothy (1996). The Nearest Faraway Place: Brian Wilson, the Beach Boys, and the Southern Californian Experience. Macmillan. ISBN 0333649370.
- Wilson, Brian; Greenman, Ben (2016). I Am Brian Wilson: A Memoir. Da Capo Press. ISBN 978-0-306-82307-7.
