= Drive-In (song) =

Song by the Beach Boys

from the album All Summer Long
- Released: July 13, 1964
- Recorded: October 1963
- Genre: Rock and roll
- Length: 1:49
- Label: Capitol
- Songwriters: Brian Wilson, Mike Love
- Producer: Brian Wilson

Licensed audio
- "Drive-In" on YouTube

"Drive-In" is a song by American rock band the Beach Boys from their 1964 album All Summer Long. It was written by Brian Wilson and Mike Love, although Love was not originally credited until after a 1990s songwriting lawsuit.

== Lyrics ==
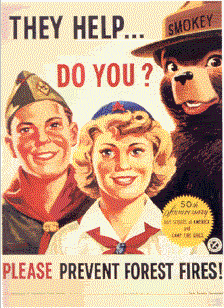
Smokey Bear (depicted here in a 1960 poster) is referenced in the song through a sexual double entendre.

"Drive-In" was inspired by the group's outings at the Studio Drive-In in Culver City, California. The song gives the listener advice on how to enter a drive-in theater without paying for admission, among other things, and climaxes with a line alluding to contraception ("If you say you watched the movie, you're a couple of liars / And remember, only you can prevent forest fires").

== Composition ==
Musician Andy Paley commented of the song,

A typical rock ‘n’ roll progression for this song would have been going from F to D minor. Brian goes from a D7 instead which is really unusual and inventive. It kind of throws you for a loop. I can’t think of any song, particularly in that time period, that does that. It was such a weird change that I remember at the time wondering if that change was a mistake or if it was done on purpose, because it almost sounds as if somebody on the record doesn’t quite know. Everybody I knew at the time was kind of scratching their head and saying ‘what is that?’

== Recording ==
"Drive-In" was recorded shortly after the release of Little Deuce Coupe in October 1963, intitally intended as the first version of "Little Saint Nick" before being rewritten. Paley shared an anecdote related to the song that occurred during the filming of the 1995 documentary Brian Wilson: I Just Wasn't Made for These Times.

Don Was said, "Brian, I have recorded all these people talking about how important your work is to them, what is the heaviest work you've ever done?" Up until that point, Brian hadn't been giving them much ... I think they were hoping to get more of him interview-wise. Brian got really excited by this question and said, "Okay, I'm gonna give you an honest answer to the best thing I ever did ... I'm gonna talk about 'Drive-In'." Brian started talking about "Drive-In" and vividly remembered cutting the track, being stoked about it, getting the guys around the microphone and getting the perfect blend. He said that was the best thing he had ever done.

== Critical reception ==
Biographer David Leaf called "Drive-In" "a great example of Brian’s sense of humor working perfectly within a rock 'n' roll song."

== Personnel ==
Credits sourced from John Brode, Will Crerar, Joshilyn Hoisington, and Craig Slowinski.

The Beach Boys

- Al Jardine - backing vocals
- Mike Love - lead vocals
- Brian Wilson - co-lead and backing vocals, upright piano
- Carl Wilson - backing vocals
- Dennis Wilson - backing vocals

Additional musicians

- Hal Blaine - drums
- Glen Campbell - electric guitar
- Frank Capp - sleigh bells
- Jerry Cole - acoustic guitar
- Steve Douglas - tenor saxophone
- Jay Migliori - baritone saxophone
- Ray Pohlman - 6-string bass guitar
- Leon Russell - grand piano
