= Hushabye =

Single by the Mystics
- B-side: "Adam and Eve"
- Released: April 1959
- Genre: Doo-wop
- Length: 2:30
- Label: Laurie
- Songwriters: Doc Pomus, Mort Shuman

The Mystics singles chronology
"Hushabye" (1959)	"Don't Take The Stars" (1959)

"Hushabye" is a song that was written by Doc Pomus and Mort Shuman in 1959 for the Brooklyn doo-wop quintet the Mystics. The group's recording of the song was a Top 20 hit.

== Background ==
In the spring of 1959, the Mystics recorded the modern South African folk song "Wimoweh" to serve as their debut release on Laurie Records. After Laurie shelved the track as lacking hit potential – the song would in fact become a 1961 #1 hit for the Tokens as "The Lion Sleeps Tonight" – the Mystics were set to record the Doc Pomus/ Mort Shuman composition "Teenager in Love". According to Al Contrera of the Mystics, the day after the Mystics had first heard "Teenager in Love", Laurie Records president Gene Schwarz advised the group that "their song" would instead be given to Dion & the Belmonts who had recorded three Top 40 hits, Schwarz's position being that "Teenager in Love"'s potential to be a smash hit was more likely to be realized via a recording by an established act. ("Teenager in Love" as recorded by Dion & the Belmonts would indeed rise as high as #5 on the Billboard Hot 100.) (Al Contrera quote:)"We were very disappointed. And Doc Pomus and Mort Shuman were disappointed too, because they wrote ['Teenager in Love'] specifically for us. So Doc says: 'We’re gonna write another song for you.'...And Gene Schwartz said to Doc and Morty: 'Could you write something in the flavor of "Little Star" by the Elegants?'”. "Little Star", a #1 hit in the summer of 1958, had been an uptempo song built around lines from the nursery rhyme "Twinkle Twinkle Little Star": with "Hushabye", Pomus and Shuman accommodated Schwarz's request by similarly building the song from the opening lines of the traditional lullaby entitled ""Hush-a-bye".

Personnel on the recording session for the Mystics' "Hushabye" included Al Caiola and Bucky Pizzarelli on guitars and Panama Francis on drums. Released in April 1959, the record would spend sixteen weeks on Billboard Hot 100 (nine of those in the top 40), peaking at #20. Adopted by disc jockey Alan Freed as the closing tune on his televised Saturday night "Big Beat Show", "Hushabye" would essentially establish the Mystics as one-hit wonders as their follow-up release "Don't Take the Stars" stalled at #98 on the Billboard Hot 100 and the group's subsequent four Laurie Records releases were all Hot 100 shortfalls.

== The Beach Boys version ==
=== Overview ===
"Hushabye" was covered by the Beach Boys on their 1964 album All Summer Long, featuring Brian Wilson and Mike Love on lead vocals. In 1993, two new versions of the song appeared on the Beach Boys' Good Vibrations box set, one live version and the other a split track with vocals in one channel and instruments in the other.

=== Personnel ===
Sourced from John Brode, Will Crerar, Joshilyn Hoisington, and Craig Slowinski.

The Beach Boys

- Al Jardine – backing vocals, bass guitar
- Mike Love – lead and backing vocals
- Brian Wilson – lead and backing vocals, upright piano
- Carl Wilson – backing vocals, electric guitar
- Dennis Wilson – backing vocals, drums

== Other versions ==
In 1969, Jay and the Americans released a version that reached #62 on the Billboard Hot 100 (lead vocalist Jay Traynor had been a latterday member of the Mystics) and #42 in Canada. Robert John also reached #99 on the Billboard Hot 100 in 1972. Also, the song peaked at #77 on Cash Box Top 100 Singles Chart.

== See also ==
- List of 1950s one-hit wonders in the United States
