= Don't Back Down =

1964 song by the Beach Boys

Song by the Beach Boys

from the album All Summer Long
- Released: July 13, 1964
- Recorded: April 29 – May 27, 1964
- Studio: Western Studios
- Genre: Vocal surf
- Length: 1:52
- Label: Capitol Records
- Songwriters: Brian Wilson, Mike Love
- Producer: Brian Wilson

"Don't Back Down"

Single by the Queers

from the album Don't Back Down
- Recorded: August 17, 1996
- Genre: Punk rock
- Length: 1:58
- Songwriters: Brian Wilson, Mike Love
- Producers: J.J. Rassler, Mass Giorgini

"Don't Back Down" is a song by the American rock band the Beach Boys and the final track on their 1964 album All Summer Long. Written by Brian Wilson and Mike Love, the lyrics describe a group of surfers who "are not afraid" and "don't back down from that wave", explaining that they "gotta be a little nuts" to show the girls "who's got guts". It was the group's last surfing-themed song until 1968's "Do It Again".

In 1990, an earlier version of "Don't Back Down" was included on a reissue CD that compiled Little Deuce Coupe and All Summer Long, and in 2014, a new stereo mix was featured on the archival release Keep an Eye on Summer. In 1996, punk rock band the Queers recorded a cover version of the song that served as the lead single for their album Don't Back Down.

== Composition ==
The song, in the key of A♭, modulates to the key of A during each chorus, and returns to A♭ during the verse. A modulation during the chorus had previously been used by Wilson in songs such as "Don't Worry Baby".

== Critical reception ==
AllMusic critic Richie Unterberger called the track a "relatively little-known treasure" and praised it for its "uncommonly anxious lyrics." Music historian Andrew Hickey called the song "one of [All Summer Long's] best tracks." Musicologist Philip Lambert said that "'Don't Back Down' positively explodes with surfing energy and vitality."

== Alternate version ==
An alternate vocal arrangement was also recorded, based on another Wilson song, "Hide Go Seek", originally recorded by The Honeys. While it shares some of the elements of the final produced version, it has a more serious tone. It was eventually changed by Wilson as he felt it was too similar to the former song.

== Personnel ==
Per John Brode, Will Crerar, Joshilyn Hoisington, and Craig Slownski.

The Beach Boys

- Al Jardine – electric bass guitars
- Mike Love – lead and backing vocals
- Brian Wilson – lead and backing vocals, upright piano, Hammond B3 organ; arranger
- Carl Wilson – backing vocals, electric guitars
- Dennis Wilson – backing vocals, drums

Additional musicians and production staff

- Hal Blaine – kick drum
- Chuck Britz – engineer
