= Wendy (The Beach Boys song) =

Song by the Beach Boys

from the album All Summer Long
- Released: July 13, 1964
- Recorded: April 29, 1964
- Studio: Western, Hollywood
- Genre: Rock
- Length: 2:16
- Label: Capitol
- Songwriters: Brian Wilson; Mike Love
- Producer: Brian Wilson

Licensed audio
- "Wendy" on YouTube

"Wendy" is a song written by Brian Wilson and Mike Love for the American rock band the Beach Boys. It was released on their 1964 album All Summer Long and was also featured on their EP, Four by the Beach Boys.

== Composition ==
"Wendy" was originally credited to just Brian Wilson. Mike Love's name was added as a result of a lawsuit filed by him against Wilson in the 1990s. In a 2007 interview, Wilson commented on the song,

It was not written about my daughter Wendy. This was way before she was born. It starts with a bass slowed down with a guitar. It was an attempt to flatter the Four Seasons. I wanted to try and imitate the Four Seasons in a way they would like to hear it. ’Cause I like [producer] Bob Crewe and the way they do their vocals.

The opening chords are whole notes played on electric guitar and bass. The song begins with a minor i chord in the key of D minor, moves to a major IV, comes back to the minor i, and then moves to a major VI chord, a IV in the key of F. The song then modulates to the key of F major (the relative major of D minor) through a substituted plagal cadence, using a I-ii progression to solidify the new tonic of F.

The verse begins with another I-IV-I progression, ending on an IV chord in the first line. The second line begins the same as the first, but moves to a major ♭VII (in D minor the neapolitan chord), and then modulates to the relative minor through use of a iii chord (A minor, the V in the key of D minor), the A minor moving to a D minor via an authentic cadence. The chorus/bridge ("I never thought a guy could cry") uses the same chord progression found in the introduction (D: i-iv-i-VI(IV in F), coming back to the key of F for the final line. This repeats for the second verse, before going into the organ solo.

After the second chorus, the song modulates again from F to D minor, this time through the usage of the ♭VII (E♭ major), which is a tritone substitution for the V of D. The solo follows the same general progression of the introduction and chorus. Another run of the verse/chorus follows, and the song then fades out with repeated I-IV cadences.

== Personnel ==
Per John Brode, Will Crerar, Joshilyn Hoisington, and Craig Slowinski.

The Beach Boys

- Al Jardine – harmony and backing vocals, bass guitars
- Mike Love – lead and bass vocals
- Brian Wilson – chorus falsetto lead vocals, harmony and backing vocals, upright piano, Hammond organ, producer, arranger
- Carl Wilson – harmony and backing vocals, electric guitars
- Dennis Wilson – harmony and backing vocals, drums

Production staff

- Chuck Britz – engineer

== Live performances ==
On September 27, 1964, the group performed "Wendy" as well as "I Get Around" on The Ed Sullivan Show. It was also a staple of the band's 50th Anniversary Tour setlist. Bruce Johnston sang the lead vocal during these performances, rather than Love.

== Alternate releases ==
Label to single release as B-side of "Good Vibrations"

"Wendy" peaked at No. 44 on the U.S. Billboard Hot 100, at No. 36 in Germany and at No. 5 in Switzerland in July 1967 when it was nominally the B-side of "Good Vibrations" — as it was everywhere outside the U.S.

== Cover versions ==
- 1986 - Descendents, "Enjoy!" & "Liveage!"
- 2017 - Bill DeMain, "Transatlantic Romantic"
