= All Summer Long (The Beach Boys song) =

Song by the Beach Boys

from the album All Summer Long
- Released: July 13, 1964
- Recorded: May 6–7, 1964
- Studio: United Western Recorders, Los Angeles
- Genre: Rock; surf; California sound
- Length: 2:06
- Label: Capitol
- Songwriters: Brian Wilson, Mike Love
- Producer: Brian Wilson

Audio sample
- file; help

Visualizer
- The Beach Boys – All Summer Long on YouTube

"All Summer Long" is a song written by Brian Wilson and Mike Love for the American rock band the Beach Boys. It was released on their 1964 album All Summer Long, and as a single in the UK in February 1965.

== Composition ==
According to AllMusic, "All Summer Long" contains beguiling teen fantasy lyrics; the narrative catalogs a series of happy events enjoyed by a guy and his girlfriend during the summer and punctuates them with the observation "every now and then we hear our song/we been having fun all summer long." The cheery sentiment of the lyrics carries over to the melody whose swirling bounciness provides a solid musical backdrop for the narrative's sunny tone, while its instrumental track is driven by boogie-woogie piano lines and marimba hooks.

== Personnel ==
Track details courtesy of session archivists John Brode, Will Crerar, Joshilyn Hoisington, and Craig Slowinski.

The Beach Boys

- Al Jardine – backing vocals, electric bass guitars
- Mike Love – lead and backing vocals
- Brian Wilson – lead and backing vocals, marimbas; producer
- Carl Wilson – backing vocals, electric guitars
- Dennis Wilson – backing vocals, drums

Additional session musicians and technical staff

- Chuck Britz – engineer
- Steve Douglas – tenor saxophones
- Jay Migliori – flutes

== Variations ==
On disc 5 of Good Vibrations: Thirty Years of The Beach Boys, there is a version of "All Summer Long" where the backing track and the vocals are separated onto two different speakers.

== Use in media ==
- The song is featured in the 1973 film American Graffiti as the closing credits roll, although the movie is set in the summer of 1962, two years before the song's release. The song was included in the film to be a metaphor for the end of the time period that the movie celebrates. There was a comparatively fast changing of the cultural and music scene as the basic rock and roll and relative innocence of the 1950s and early 1960s in America gave way to the actual cultural end of the 1950s in America, signaled by the assassination of President John Kennedy—a popular, youthful, and charismatic president, impending American civil rights legislation, the arrival of the Beatles and their influence on America – on the popular music and style of the time, including that of Brian Wilson and the Beach Boys – as well as the beginning of American's divisive involvement in the Vietnam War and its subsequent impact, leading to the greater political involvement of young Americans, which was to then be reflected in the culture of the time. Shortly before the ending credits of the film begin, there is silence as a montage shows how Vietnam and the future directly affects certain characters in the film. The tacit, sobering reality brought to the audience at this point is made even greater when it is broken by the bright, upbeat opening marimba of this energetic and positive Beach Boys song as the ending credits begin, with the song's nostalgic lyrics of idyllic summers past creating a certain bittersweet tone that effectively washes over the audience.
- It also appears as the closing credits roll on The Simpsons season 7 finale episode "Summer of 4 Ft. 2". The episode makes a number of American Graffiti references.
