= Little Honda =

Song by the Beach Boys

from the album All Summer Long
- Released: July 13, 1964
- Recorded: April 2 & 10, 1964
- Studio: Western, Hollywood
- Genre: Pop rock; hot rod rock; garage rock; car song
- Length: 1:52
- Label: Capitol
- Songwriters: Brian Wilson; Mike Love
- Producer: Brian Wilson

Licensed audio
- "Little Honda" on YouTube

"Little Honda" is a song by the American rock band the Beach Boys from their 1964 album All Summer Long. Written by Brian Wilson and Mike Love, it pays tribute to the small Honda motorcycle and its ease of operation, specifically the Honda 50.

At 21 seconds into the song the definite sound of guitar feedback can be heard. The recording on April 2 & 10, 1964 of the song predates the Beatles' "I Feel Fine" by several months. While buried under vocals on the original release, with the 1968 instrumental track release on the Beach Boys LP "Stack-o-Tracks", this high-pitched feedback howl can be heard.

Immediately following its appearance on All Summer Long, the song was covered by the Hondells, whose recording produced by Gary Usher peaked at No. 9 on the U.S. Billboard 100.

== Recording ==
In a 1976 interview, Carl Wilson recounted an anecdote about "Little Honda",

[Brian] does exactly what he wants to do. I remember [sits back and laughs] — this is so funny — when we did "Little Honda," Brian wanted me to get this real distorted guitar sound, real fuzzy. "This guitar sounds like shit," I said. "Brian, I hate this." And he goes, "Would you fucking do it? Just do it." When I heard it, I felt like an asshole. It sounded really hot. That was before fuzz became a big deal.

== Alternate version ==
In 2014, a compilation album of studio and live recordings of the Beach Boys was released entitled, Keep an Eye on Summer – The Beach Boys Sessions 1964. It was released exclusively through the iTunes Store. On that album, another version of the song was heard, with the major difference being that the background refrain was, "Go little Honda, faster little Honda" instead of, "Honda, Honda, go faster, faster." The third verse also had slightly different lyrics (e.g., "Champ" was used instead of "Matchless").

== Personnel ==
Per John Brode, Will Crerar, Joshilyn Hoisington, and Craig Slowinski.

The Beach Boys

- Al Jardine – backing vocals, electric bass guitars
- Mike Love – lead vocals
- Brian Wilson – backing vocals, upright piano, Hammond organ; producer
- Carl Wilson – backing vocals, electric guitars
- Dennis Wilson – co-lead and backing vocals, drums

Additional musicians and production staff

- Chuck Britz – engineer

== Charts ==
The Beach Boys

Chart (1964–65)	Peak position
Canada Top Singles (RPM)	15
Norway (VG-lista)	8
US Billboard Hot 100	65
West Germany (GfK)	44

== Covers ==
- 1964 – The Hondells, single "Little Honda" (#5 CAN
- 1965 – Jan & Dean, Command Performance
- 1973 – Dove, single "Little Honda"
- 1974 – The Carpenters, ‘’Live In Japan’’ (Live concert recording)
- 1996 – The Queers, Bubblegum Dreams 7", Lookout!
- 1997 – Yo La Tengo, I Can Hear the Heart Beating as One
- 2003 – Travoltas, Party!
