= The Beach Boys discography =

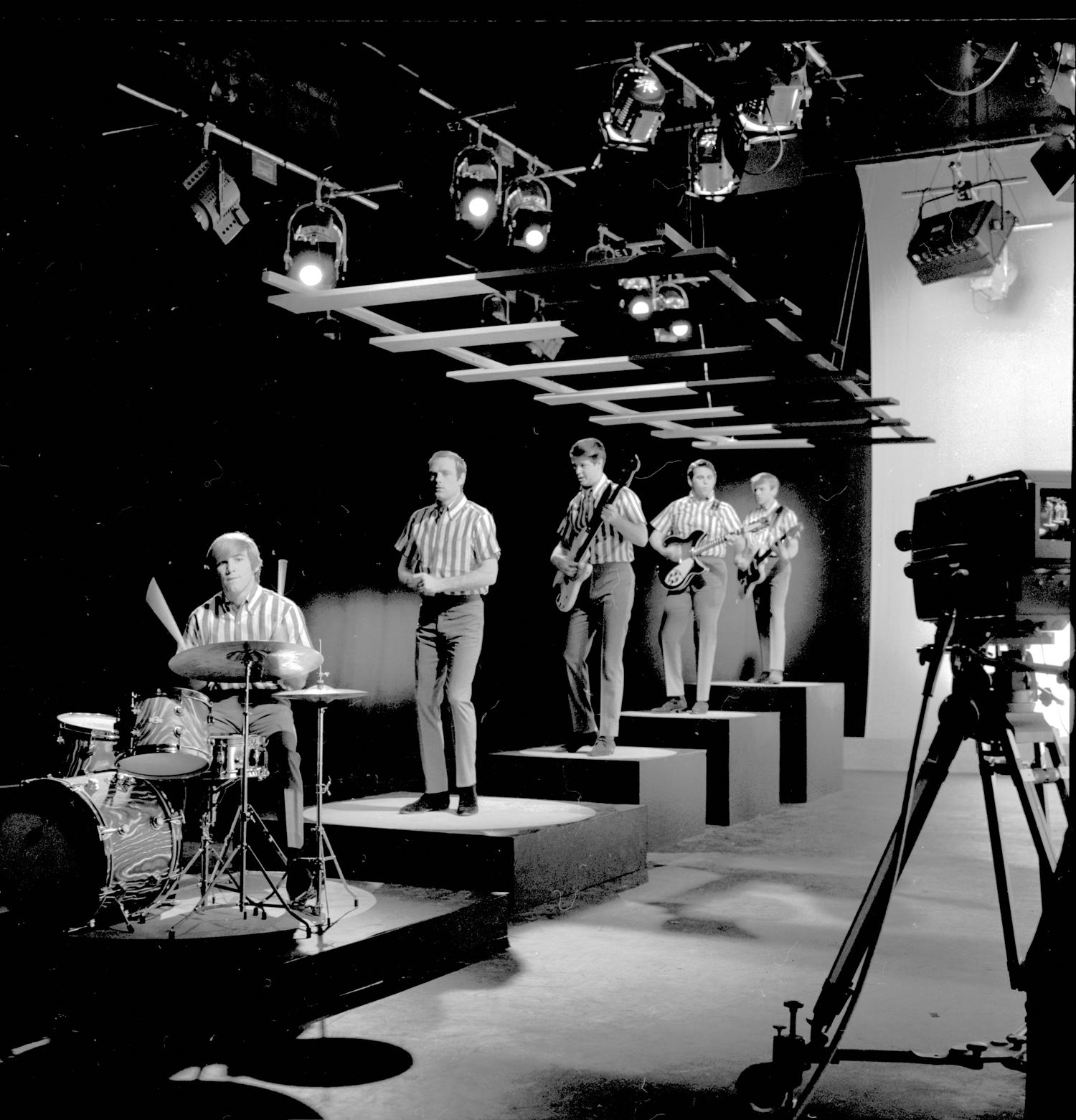
- The Beach Boys in 1964
- Studio albums: 29
- Extended plays: 25
- Soundtrack albums: 1
- Live albums: 12
- Compilation albums: 58
- Singles: 75
- Video albums: 14
- Music videos: 36
- Remix albums: 2

The Beach Boys are an American rock band formed in Hawthorne, California, in 1961. Their discography from 1961 to 1984 was originally released on the vinyl format, with the 1985 album The Beach Boys being the group's first CD release. The Beach Boys' catalogue has also been released on reel-to-reel, 8-track, cassette, CD, MiniDisc, digital downloads, and various streaming services.

The group has released 29 studio albums, 2 remix albums, 11 live albums, 55 compilation albums, and 75 singles. The release dates and sequence of the Beach Boys' albums in the UK up to Pet Sounds differ significantly from the original US releases.

== Studio albums ==
Title	Album details	Peak chart positions						Certifications (sales thresholds)
Title	Album details	US	AUS	CAN	GER	NL	UK	Certifications (sales thresholds)
Surfin' Safari	Released: October 1, 1962; Label: Capitol; Format: LP	32	—	—	—	—	—	
Surfin' U.S.A.	Released: March 25, 1963; Label: Capitol; Format: LP	2	—	1	—	—	17	RIAA: Gold
Surfer Girl	Released: September 16, 1963; Label: Capitol; Format: LP	7	—	—	—	—	13	RIAA: Gold
Little Deuce Coupe	Released: October 7, 1963; Label: Capitol; Format: LP	4	—	—	—	—	—	RIAA: Platinum
Shut Down Volume 2	Released: March 2, 1964; Label: Capitol; Format: LP	13	—	—	—	—	—	RIAA: Gold
All Summer Long	Released: July 13, 1964; Label: Capitol; Format: LP	4	—	—	—	—	9	RIAA: Gold
The Beach Boys' Christmas Album	Released: November 9, 1964; Label: Capitol; Format: LP	66	—	—	—	—	—	RIAA: Gold
The Beach Boys Today!	Released: March 8, 1965; Label: Capitol; Format: LP	4	—	—	14	—	6	RIAA: Gold
Summer Days (And Summer Nights!!)	Released: July 5, 1965; Label: Capitol; Format: LP	2	—	—	18	—	4	RIAA: Gold
Beach Boys' Party!	Released: November 8, 1965; Label: Capitol; Format: LP	6	—	—	4	—	3	
Pet Sounds	Released: May 16, 1966; Label: Capitol; Format: LP	10	42^{[A]}	40^{[A]}	16	72	2	RIAA: 2× Platinum; BPI: 2× Platinum
Smiley Smile	Released: September 18, 1967; Label: Brother; Format: LP	41	—	—	—	—	9	
Wild Honey	Released: December 18, 1967; Label: Capitol; Format: LP	24	—	41^{[B]}	20	—	7	
Friends	Released: June 24, 1968; Label: Capitol; Format: LP	126	—	—	—	—	13	
20/20	Released: February 10, 1969; Label: Capitol; Format: LP	68	—	41^{[B]}	23	20	3	
Sunflower	Released: August 31, 1970; Labels: Brother, Reprise; Format: LP	151	—	79	—	10	29	
Surf's Up	Released: August 30, 1971; Labels: Brother, Reprise; Format: LP	29	32	22	—	—	15	
Carl and the Passions – "So Tough"	Released: May 15, 1972; Labels: Brother, Reprise; Format: LP, 2×LP^{[C]}	50	42	40	—	—	25	
Holland	Released: January 8, 1973; Labels: Brother, Reprise; Format: LP + 7-inch EP	36	37	12	—	9	20	BPI: Silver
15 Big Ones	Released: July 5, 1976; Labels: Brother, Reprise; Format: LP	8	17	6	—	14	31	RIAA: Gold; BPI: Silver
The Beach Boys Love You	Released: April 11, 1977; Labels: Brother, Reprise; Format: LP	53	90	66	—	—	28	
M.I.U. Album	Released: September 25, 1978; Labels: Brother, Reprise; Format: LP	151	70	—	—	—	—	
L.A. (Light Album)	Released: March 16, 1979; Label: Caribou; Format: LP	100	70	88	—	43	32	
Keepin' the Summer Alive	Released: March 24, 1980; Label: Caribou; Format: LP	75	64	79	—	—	54	
The Beach Boys	Released: June 10, 1985; Label: Caribou; Format: LP, CD	52	67	74	60	—	60	
Still Cruisin'	Released: August 28, 1989; Label: Capitol; Format: LP, CD	46	10	75	26	92	—	RIAA: Platinum; ARIA: Gold
Summer in Paradise	Released: August 3, 1992; Label: Brother; Format: CD , LP (South Korea release)	—	53	—	81	—	—	
Stars and Stripes Vol. 1	Released: August 19, 1996; Label: River North; Format: CD	101	—	—	—	—	—	
That's Why God Made the Radio	Released: June 5, 2012; Label: Capitol; Format: CD, LP	3	31	14	36	24	15	
"—" denotes a release that did not chart, was not released in the country or the information is unknown

== Remix albums ==
Album	Year	Peak chart positions				Certifications (sales thresholds)
Album	Year	US	AUS	NL	UK	Certifications (sales thresholds)
Stack-o-Tracks	Released: August 19, 1968; Label: Capitol; Format: LP	—	—	—	—	
The Beach Boys with the Royal Philharmonic Orchestra	Released: June 8, 2018; Label: Capitol; Format: CD, LP, DD	165	32	166	4	BPI: Silver

== Live albums ==
Title	Album details	Peak chart positions					Certifications
Title	Album details	US	AUS	CAN	GER	UK	Certifications
Beach Boys Concert	Released: October 19, 1964; Label: Capitol; Format: LP	1	3	—	14	—	RIAA: Gold
Live in London	Released: May 1970 (UK), November 1976 (US); Label: Capitol; Format: LP	75^{[D]}	—	—	—	—	
The Beach Boys in Concert	Released: November 19, 1973; Labels: Brother, Reprise; Format: 2xLP	25	29	25	—	—	RIAA: Gold
Good Timin': Live at Knebworth England 1980	Released: November 26, 2002; Labels: Brother, Eagle; Format: CD	—	—	—	—	—	RIAA: Gold
Songs from Here & Back	Released: May 15, 2006; Labels: Hallmark Cards; Format: CD	—	—	—	—	—	
The 50th Anniversary Tour	Release: May 21, 2013; Label: Capitol; Format: CD	94	—	—	—	82	
Live in Sacramento 1964	Release: December 2, 2014; Label: Capitol; Format: DD	—	—	—	—	—	
Live in Chicago 1965	Release: December 11, 2015; Label: Capitol; Format: DD	—	—	—	—	—	
Graduation Day 1966: Live at the University of Michigan	Release: December 9, 2016; Label: Capitol; Format: DD	—	—	—	—	—	
Live Sunshine 1967	Release: December 8, 2017; Label: Capitol; Format: DD	—	—	—	—	—	
The Beach Boys On Tour 1968	Release: December 14, 2018; Label: Capitol; Format: DD	—	—	—	—	—	

== Compilation albums ==
Album	Year	Peak chart positions						Certifications (sales thresholds)
Album	Year	US	AUS	CAN	GER	NL	UK	Certifications (sales thresholds)
Best of The Beach Boys, Vol. 1	1966	8	—	—	—	—	2	RIAA: 2× Platinum; BPI: Platinum
Best of The Beach Boys Vol. 2	1967	50	—	—	—	—	3	RIAA: 2× Platinum; BPI: Platinum
Best of The Beach Boys Vol. 3	1968	153	—	—	—	—	8	
Good Vibrations	1970	—	—	77	—	—	—	
Greatest Hits	1970	—	—	—	—	—	5	
Endless Summer	1974	1	23	1	—	—	—	RIAA: 3× Platinum; MC: Gold; BPI: Gold
Spirit of America	1975	8	79	25	—	—	—	RIAA: Gold
Good Vibrations: Best of The Beach Boys	1975	25	—	69	—	—	—	
20 Golden Greats	1976	—	26	—	—	—	1	BPI: Platinum; BVMI: Gold
The Capitol Years	1980	—	—	—	—	—	—	
Ten Years of Harmony	1981	156	—	—	—	—	—	
Sunshine Dream	1982	180	—	—	—	—	—	
Be True to Your School	1982	—	—	—	—	—	—	
Rarities	1983	—	—	—	—	—	—	
The Very Best of The Beach Boys	1983	—	8	—	—	—	1	
Made in U.S.A.	1986	96	67	—	—	—	—	RIAA: 2× Platinum
California Gold: The Very Best of The Beach Boys	1990	—	—	—	30	17	—	
Summer Dreams	1990	—	10	—	—	—	2	ARIA: 3× Platinum; BPI: Platinum
Lost & Found (1961–62)	1991	—	—	—	—	—	—	
Good Vibrations: Thirty Years of The Beach Boys	1993	—	—	—	—	—	—	RIAA: Gold
I Love You	1993	—	—	—	—	—	—	BPI: Gold
The Best of The Beach Boys	1995	—	—	—	—	—	25	BPI: Silver
20 Good Vibrations: Greatest Hits Volume 1	1995	95	—	—	—	—	—	RIAA: 2× Platinum; ARIA: Gold
20 Great Love Songs	1996	—	—	—	—	—	—	BPI: Silver
The Pet Sounds Sessions	1997	—	—	—	—	—	—	
Greatest Hits	1998	—	—	—	—	—	28	BPI: Gold
Endless Harmony Soundtrack	1998	—	—	—	—	—	56	
Ultimate Christmas	1998	—	—	—	—	—	—	
20 More Good Vibrations: Greatest Hits Volume 2	1999	192	—	—	—	—	—	
Best of the Brother Years 1970–1986: Greatest Hits Volume 3	2000	—	—	—	—	—	—	
Hawthorne, CA: Birthplace of a Musical Legacy	2001	—	—	—	—	—	—	
The Very Best of The Beach Boys	2001	—	—	—	—	—	31	BPI: 2× Platinum
Classics Selected by Brian Wilson	2002	159	—	—	—	—	112	
Hits Of The Beach Boys	2002	—	—	—	—	—	—	BPI: Silver
Sounds of Summer: The Very Best of The Beach Boys	2003	14	37	93	24	—	32	RIAA: 3× Platinum; ARIA: 2× Platinum; BPI: Silver; MC: Platinum
The Platinum Collection (Sounds of Summer Edition)	2005	—	—	—	—	33	30	
The Warmth of the Sun	2007	40	—	64	—	—	—	
The Original US Singles Collection The Capitol Years 1962–1965	2008	—	—	—	—	—	—	
Summer Love Songs	2009	—	—	—	—	—	—	
The Smile Sessions	2011	27	—	—	26	20	25	
50th Anniversary Collection 'Zinepak (Walmart exclusive)	2012	86	—	—	—	—	—	
50 Big Ones: Greatest Hits	2012	95	—	—	96	—	30	
Greatest Hits	2012	—	—	—	—	32	—	
Made in California	2013	—	—	—	—	—	—	
The Big Beat: 1963	2013	—	—	—	—	—	—	
Keep an Eye on Summer: 1964	2014	—	—	—	—	—	—	
Beach Boys' Party! Uncovered and Unplugged	2015	—	—	—	—	—	—	
Pet Sounds: 50th Anniversary	2016	—	—	—	—	—	—	
Becoming The Beach Boys: The Complete Hite & Dorinda Morgan Sessions	2016	—	—	—	—	—	—	
Sunshine Tomorrow: 1967	2017	145	—	—	—	—	49	
Sunshine Tomorrow 2: The Studio Sessions 1967	2017	—	—	—	—	—	—	
Wake the World: The Friends Sessions 1968	2018	—	—	—	—	—	—	
I Can Hear Music: The 20/20 Sessions 1968	2018	—	—	—	—	—	—	
Feel Flows: The Sunflower & Surf's Up Sessions 1969–1971	2021	83	—	—	19	—	19	
Sail On Sailor: 1972	2022	—	—	—	84	—	—	
We Gotta Groove: The Brother Studio Years	2026	—	—	—	—	—	—	

== Singles ==
Listed below are Beach Boys A and B sides. For Beach Boys singles not issued under the group name, EP tracks, featured tracks, see other songs. In total the Beach Boys have had 10 number one singles across the world and across all charts.

=== 1960s ===
Year	Single	Peak chart positions										Certifications (sales thresholds)	Album
Year	Single	US	US Cash Box	US Record World	AUS	CAN	NL	NOR	SWE	UK	PHI	Certifications (sales thresholds)	Album
1961	"Surfin'" "Luau" (non-album track)	75 —	85 —	— —	— —	— —	— —	— —	— —	— —	— —	—	Surfin' Safari
1962	"Surfin' Safari" "409"	14; 76	10 —	— —	48 —	— —	— —	— —	1 —	— —	— —	RIAA: Gold	Surfin' Safari
1962	"Ten Little Indians" "County Fair"	49 —	50 —	— —	— —	39 —	— —	— —	6 —	— —	— —	—	Surfin' Safari
1962	"Little Girl (You're My Miss America)" "Summertime Blues"	— —	— —	— —	— —	— —	— —	— —	— —	— —	— 8	—	Surfin' Safari
1963	"Surfin' U.S.A." "Shut Down"	3^{[P]} 23	3; 25	— —	12 —	2 —	— —	— —	6 —	34 —	— —	RIAA: 2× Platinum; BPI: Gold; RMNZ: Platinum	Surfin' U.S.A.
1963	"Surfer Girl" "Little Deuce Coupe"	7; 15	5; 19	— —	17; 17	3 —	— —	— —	— —	— —	— —	RIAA: Gold; RIAA: Gold	Surfer Girl
1963	"Be True to Your School" "In My Room" (from Surfer Girl)	6; 23	8; 34	— —	78; 78	4 —	— —	— —	6 —	— —	— —	RIAA: Gold	Little Deuce Coupe
1963	"Little Saint Nick" "The Lord's Prayer" (non-album track)	25 —	— —	— —	39 —	28 —	5 —	— —	6 —	43 —	— —	RIAA: 3× Platinum; RMNZ: Platinum	The Beach Boys' Christmas Album
1964	"Fun, Fun, Fun" "Why Do Fools Fall in Love"	5 —^{[I]}	6 —	12* —*	9 —	6 —	— —	— —	— —	— —	— —	RIAA: Platinum	Shut Down Volume 2
1964	"I Get Around" "Don't Worry Baby" (from Shut Down Volume 2)	1; 24	1; 26	1; 22	33; 33	1; 1	— —	11 —	10 —	7 —	— —	RIAA: 2× Platinum; BPI: Silver; RMNZ: Gold; RIAA: Platinum; RMNZ: Gold	All Summer Long
1964	"When I Grow Up (To Be a Man)" "She Knows Me Too Well"	9 —^{[J]}	7; 93	7; 93	39 —	1 —	— —	— —	— —	27 —	— —	—	The Beach Boys Today!
1964	"Dance, Dance, Dance" "The Warmth of the Sun" (from Shut Down Volume 2)	8 —	10 —	9 —	52 —	7 —	— —	— —	6 —	24 —	— —	—	The Beach Boys Today!
1964	"Little Deuce Coupe"" ""The Little Old Lady From Pasadena"	— —	— —	— —	— —	— —	— —	— —	— —	— —	— 7	—	Beach Boys Concert
1964	"The Man with All the Toys" "Blue Christmas"	— —	116 —	143 —	— —	— —	— —	— —	— —	— —	— —	—	The Beach Boys' Christmas Album
1965	"Papa-Oom-Mow-Mow" "Monster Mash"	— —	— —	— —	— —	— —	— —	— —	— —	— —	3 —	—	Beach Boys Concert
1965	"Do You Wanna Dance?" "Please Let Me Wonder"	12; 52	13; 85	13; 46	95 —	17 —	— —	— —	9 —	— —	— —	—	The Beach Boys Today!
1965	"Help Me, Rhonda" "Kiss Me, Baby" (from The Beach Boys Today!)	1 —	1 —	1 —	16 —	1 —	— —	7 —	5 —	27 —	— —	RIAA: Gold	Summer Days (And Summer Nights!!)
1965	"California Girls" "Let Him Run Wild"	3 —	3 —	3 —	58 —	2 —	— —	— —	6 —	26 —	— —	RIAA: Platinum	Summer Days (And Summer Nights!!)
1965	"The Little Girl I Once Knew" "There's No Other (Like My Baby)" (from Beach Boys' Party!)	20 —	15 —	16 —	— —	10 —	— —	— —	— —	— —	— —	—	Non-album track
1965	"Barbara Ann" "Girl Don't Tell Me" (from Summer Days (And Summer Nights!!))	2 —	1 —	1 —	2 —	2 —	17 —	1 —	2 —	3 —	— —	RIAA: Platinum	Beach Boys' Party!
1966	"Sloop John B" "You're So Good to Me" (from Summer Days (And Summer Nights!!))	3 —	5 —	2 —	17; 17	2 —	1 —	1 —	1 —	2 —	— —	RIAA: Platinum; BPI: Silver	Pet Sounds
1966	"Wouldn't It Be Nice" "God Only Knows"	8; 39	7; 38	5; 38	2 —	4 —	— —	— 6	— —	— 2	— —	RIAA: 4× Platinum; BPI: Gold; RMNZ: Platinum; RIAA: 2× Platinum; BPI: Platinum; RMNZ: Platinum	Pet Sounds
1966	"Good Vibrations" "Let's Go Away for Awhile" (from Pet Sounds)	1 —	1 —	1 —	1 —	2 —	2 —	2 —	3 —	1 —	— —	RIAA: 3× Platinum; BPI: Platinum; RMNZ: 2× Platinum	Smiley Smile
1967	"Then I Kissed Her" "Mountain of Love" (from Beach Boys' Party!)	— —	— —	— —	12 —	— —	2 —	10 —	— —	4 —	— —	—	Summer Days (And Summer Nights!!)
1967	"Heroes and Villains" "You're Welcome" (non-album track)	12 —	8 —	8 —	13 —	14 —	10 —	— —	7 —	8 —	— —	—	Smiley Smile
1967	"Wild Honey" "Wind Chimes" (from Smiley Smile)	31 —	22 —	23 —	25 —	29 —	20 —	— —	— —	29 —	— —	—	Wild Honey
1967	"Darlin'" "Here Today" (from Pet Sounds)	19 —	10 —	17 —	28 —	13 —	17 —	11 —	15 —	11 —	— —	—	Wild Honey
1967	"I Was Made to Love Her" "How She Boogalooed It"	— —	— —	— —	— —	— —	— —	— —	10	— —	— —	—	Wild Honey
1968	"Friends" "Little Bird"	47 —	37 —	34 —	— —	50 —	— —	— —	— —	25 —	— —	—	Friends
1968	"Do It Again" "Wake the World" (from Friends)	20 —	8 —	7 —	2 —	10 —	3 —	7 —	5 —	1 —	— —	—	Non-album track
1968	"Bluebirds over the Mountain" "Never Learn Not to Love"	61 —	56 —	36 —	90 —	53 —	9 —	— —	— —	33 —	— —	—	20/20
1969	"I Can Hear Music" "All I Want to Do"	24 —	20 —	20 —	10 —	34 —	4 —	11 —	5 —	10 —	— —	—	20/20
1969	"Break Away" "Celebrate the News"	63 —	38 —	35 —	83 —	38 —	20 —	14 —	— —	6 —	— —	—	Non-album single
"—" denotes a release that did not chart, was not released in the country or the information is unknown (* - US Record World chart data incomplete for early 1964)													

=== 1970s ===
Year	Single	Peak chart positions										Album
Year	Single	US	US Cash Box	US Record World	US AC	AUS	CAN	NL	NOR	SWE	UK	Album
1970	"Add Some Music to Your Day" "Susie Cincinnati" (non-album B-side, later included on 15 Big Ones)	64 —	49 —	39 —	— —	— —	43 —	— —	— —	— —	— —	Sunflower
1970	"Cottonfields" "The Nearest Faraway Place" (from 20/20)	103 —	101 —	95 —	— —	1 —	— —	13 —	2 —	1 —	5 —	Non-album single
1970	"Slip On Through" "This Whole World"	— —	— —	125 —	— —	— —	— —	— —	— —	— —	— —	Sunflower
1970	"Tears in the Morning" "It's About Time"	— —	— —	117 —	— —	— —	— —	4 —	— —	— —	— —	Sunflower
1971	"Cool, Cool Water" "Forever"	— —	— —	— —	— —	— —	— —	— —	— —	— —	— —	Sunflower
1971	"Wouldn't It Be Nice" (Recorded Live At Big Sur) "The Times They Are A Changin'" (recorded live at Big Sur by Merry Clayton)	— —	— —	— —	— —	— —	— —	— —	— —	— —	— —	Celebration - The Big Sur Folk Festival 1970
1971	"Long Promised Road" "Deirdre" (from Sunflower) "'Til I Die"	89 — —	79 — —	91 — —	— — —	— — —	72 — —	— — —	— — —	— — —	— — —	Surf's Up
1971	"Student Demonstration Time" "Don't Go Near the Water"	— —	— —	— —	— —	62 —	— —	21 —	— —	— —	— —	Surf's Up
1971	"Surf's Up" "Don't Go Near the Water"	— —	— —	124 —	— —	— —	— —	— —	— —	— —	— —	Surf's Up
1972	"You Need a Mess of Help to Stand Alone" "Cuddle Up"	— —	— —	— —	— —	— —	— —	29 —	— —	— —	— —	Carl and the Passions - So Tough
1972	"Marcella" "Hold On Dear Brother"	—^{[F]} —	116 —	129 —	— —	— —	— —	20 —	— —	— —	— —	Carl and the Passions - So Tough
1973	"Sail On, Sailor"^{[G]} "Only with You"	49 —	62 —	75 —	— —	— —	73 —	28 —	— —	— —	— —	Holland
1973	"California Saga: California" "Funky Pretty"	84 —	— —	99 —	— —	— —	85 —	— —	— —	— —	37 —	Holland
1974	"Surfin' USA" "The Warmth of the Sun"	— —	— —	— —	— —	— 66	— —	— —	— —	— —	— —	Endless Summer
1974	"Child of Winter" ”Good Vibrations” "Susie Cincinnati"	— —	— —	— —	— —	— —	— —	— —	— —	— —	— —	Non-album track
1975	"Little Honda" "Hawaii"	— —	— —	— —	— —	— —	— —	— —	— —	— —	— —	Spirit of America
1975	"Barbara Ann" "Little Honda"	—^{[N]} —	— —	— —	— —	— —	— —	— —	— —	— —	— —	Spirit of America
1975	"Wouldn't It Be Nice" "Caroline, No"	—^{[O]} —	— —	— —	— —	— —	— —	— —	— —	— —	— —	Good Vibrations – Best of The Beach Boys
1976	"Rock and Roll Music" "TM Song"	5 —	11 —	7 —	— —	35 —	11 —	— —	— —	— —	36 —	15 Big Ones
1976	"It's O.K." "Had to Phone Ya"	29 —	39 —	46 —	33 —	— —	36 —	— —	— —	— —	— —	15 Big Ones
1976	"Susie Cincinnati" "Everyone's in Love with You"	— —	— —	109 —	— —	— —	— —	— —	— —	— —	— —	15 Big Ones
1976	"Good Vibrations" "Wouldn't It Be Nice"	— —	— —	— —	— —	— —	— —	— —	— —	— —	18 —	20 Golden Greats
1977	"Honkin' Down the Highway" "Solar System"	— —	— —	— —	— —	— —	— —	— —	— —	— —	— —	The Beach Boys Love You
1978	"Peggy Sue" "Hey Little Tomboy"	59 —	66 —	66 —	46 —	97 —	61 —	— —	— —	— —	— —	M.I.U. Album
1979	"Here Comes the Night" "Baby Blue"	44 —	52 —	67 —	— —	90 —	73 —	— —	— —	— —	37 —	L.A. (Light Album)
1979	"Good Timin'" "Love Surrounds Me"	40 —	33 —	45 —	12 —	— —	36 —	— —	— —	— —	— —	L.A. (Light Album)
1979	"Lady Lynda" "Full Sail"	— —	— —	— —	39 —	54 —	— —	— —	— —	— —	6 —	L.A. (Light Album)
1979	"It's a Beautiful Day" "Sumahama" (from L.A. (Light Album))	— —	— —	— —	— —	— —	— —	— —	— —	— —	— 45	Americathon (soundtrack)
"—" denotes a release that did not chart, was not released in the country or the information is unknown												

=== 1980s ===
Year	Single	Peak chart positions							Certifications	Album
Year	Single	US	US Cash Box	US AC	AUS	CAN	GER	UK	Certifications	Album
1980	"Goin' On" "Endless Harmony"	83 —	103 —	— —	— —	— —	— —	— —	—	Keepin' the Summer Alive
1980	"Livin' with a Heartache" "Santa Ana Winds"	— —	— —	— —	— —	— —	— —	— —	—	Keepin' the Summer Alive
1980	"Keepin' the Summer Alive" "When Girls Get Together"	— —	— —	— —	— —	— —	— —	— —	—	Keepin' the Summer Alive
1981	"The Beach Boys Medley" "God Only Knows" (from Pet Sounds)	12 —	8 —	20 —	16 —	13 —	— —	47 —	—	Sunshine Dream
1981	"Come Go with Me" (from M.I.U. Album) "Don't Go Near the Water" (from Surf's Up)	18 —	20 —	11 —	— —	20 —	— —	— —	—	Ten Years of Harmony
1984	"East Meets West" (with The Four Seasons) "Rhapsody" (The Four Seasons)	— —	— —	— —	— —	— —	— —	— —	—	Non-album track
1985	"Getcha Back" "Male Ego" (non-album track)	26 —	25 —	2 —	81 —	26 —	12 —	97 —	—	The Beach Boys
1985	"It's Gettin' Late" "It's OK" (from 15 Big Ones)	82 —	78 —	20 —	— —	— —	— —	— —	—	The Beach Boys
1985	"She Believes in Love Again" "It's Just a Matter of Time"	— —	— —	26 —	— —	— —	— —	— —	—	The Beach Boys
1985	"Passing Friend" "It's OK" (from 15 Big Ones)	— —	— —	— —	— —	— —	— —	— —	—	The Beach Boys
1986	"Rock 'n' Roll to the Rescue" "Good Vibrations" (Live) (from Live in London)	68 —	68 —	— —	79 —	73 —	— —	— —	—	Made in U.S.A.
1986	"California Dreamin'" "Lady Liberty" (non-album track)	57 —	49 —	8 —	— —	40 —	— —	— —	—	Made in U.S.A.
1987	"Wipeout!" (with The Fat Boys) "Crushin'" (The Fat Boys)	12 —	28 —	— —	— —	12 —	30 —	2 —	—	Still Cruisin'
1987	"Happy Endings" (with Little Richard) "California Girls" (live)	— —	— —	45 —	— —	— —	— —	— —	—	Non-album track
1988	"Kokomo" "Tutti Frutti" (Little Richard)	1 —	1 —	5 —	1 —	4 —	7 —	25 —	RIAA: 4× Platinum; ARIA: Platinum; BPI: Silver; RMNZ: 2× Platinum	Still Cruisin'
1988	"Don't Worry Baby" (with The Everly Brothers) "Tequila Dreams" (Dave Grusin)	— —	— —	— —	— —	— —	41 —	— —	—	Tequila Sunrise (soundtrack)
1989	"Still Cruisin'" "Kokomo"	93 —	— —	9 —	28 —	55 —	51 —	78 —	—	Still Cruisin'
"—" denotes a release that did not chart, was not released in the country or the information is unknown										

=== 1990–present ===
Year	Single	Peak chart positions								Certifications	Album
Year	Single	US	US Cash Box	US AC	AUS	CAN	GER	UK	US Cou	Certifications	Album
1990	"Somewhere Near Japan" "Kokomo"	— —	— —	— —	132 —	— —	— —	— —	— —	—	Still Cruisin'
1990	"Problem Child" "Problem Child" (Instrumental) (non-album track)	— —	— —	38 —	— —	— —	— —	— —	— —	—	Problem Child (soundtrack)
1991	"Crocodile Rock" "Crocodile Rock"	— —	— —	— —	— —	— —	— —	— —	— —	—	Two Rooms: Celebrating the Songs of Elton John & Bernie Taupin
1991	"California Dreamin'" "Kokomo" (Spanish version)	— —	— —	— —	— —	— —	— —	— —	— —	—	California Gold: The Very Best of The Beach Boys
1992	"Hot Fun in the Summertime" "Tears in the Morning" (from Sunflower)	— —	— —	17 —	122 —	66 —	— —	— —	— —	—	Summer in Paradise
1992	"Forever" (AC Mix) "Forever" (CHR Mix) "Forever" (CD mix)	— —	— —	— —	100 —	— —	— —	— —	— —	—	Summer in Paradise
1992	"Under the Boardwalk" (no B-side)	— —	— —	— —	— —	— —	— —	— —	— —	—	Summer in Paradise
1993	"Summer in Paradise" "Summer in Paradise" (Live at Wembley Arena, 1993) (non-album b-side)	— —	— —	— —	— —	— —	— —	— —	— —	—	Summer in Paradise
1993	"Summer of Love" "Summer in Paradise" (The Theme From Baywatch) I'm Always Here) (b-side recorded by Jimi Jamison)	— —	— —	— —	— —	— —	— —	— —	— —	—	Summer in Paradise
1996	"I Just Wasn't Made for These Times" "Wouldn't It Be Nice" (Vocals only), "Here Today" (Stereo backing track)	— —	— —	— —	— —	— —	— —	— —	— —	—	The Pet Sounds Sessions
1996	"I Can Hear Music" (with Kathy Troccoli) "Little Deuce Coupe" "Help Me, Rhonda"^{[L]}	— —^{[L]}	— —	16 —	— —	— —^{[L]}	— —	— —	— —	—	Stars and Stripes Vol. 1
1996	"Don't Worry Baby"(with Lorrie Morgan) (No B-side)	—	—	—	—	—	—	—	73^{[M]}	—	Stars and Stripes Vol. 1
1996	"Long Tall Texan" (with Doug Supernaw) (No B-side)	—	—	—	—	—	—	—	69 (Canada Country Charts 41)	—	Stars and Stripes Vol. 1
1996	"Little Deuce Coupe" (with James House) (No B-side)	—	—	—	—	—	—	—	69 (Canada Country Charts 82)	—	Stars and Stripes Vol. 1
2011	"Don't Fight the Sea" (with Al Jardine) "Friends" (a cappella) (non-album track)	— —	— —	— —	— —	— —	— —	— —	— —	—	A Postcard from California
2011	"Cabin Essence" "Wonderful"	— —	— —	— —	— —	— —	— —	— —	— —	—	The Smile Sessions
2011	"Vega-Tables" "Surf's Up"	— —	— —	— —	— —	— —	— —	— —	— —	—	The Smile Sessions
2012	"That's Why God Made the Radio" "That's Why God Made the Radio" (Instrumental) (non-album track)	— —	— —	30 —	— —	— —	— —	— —	— —	—	That's Why God Made the Radio
2012	"Isn't It Time" "Isn't It Time" (Instrumental) (non-album track)	— —	— —	— —	— —	— —	— —	— —	— —	—	That's Why God Made the Radio
"—" denotes a release that did not chart, was not released in the country or the information is unknown											

=== Year-end charts ===
==== Billboard Year-End performances ====
Year	Song	Year-End position
1962	"Surfin' Safari"	100
1963	"Surfin' U.S.A."	1
1963	"Shut Down"	86
1964	"I Get Around"	5
1965	"Help Me, Rhonda"	11
1965	"California Girls"	49
1966	"Sloop John B"	53
1966	"Barbara Ann"	73
1966	"Wouldn't It Be Nice"	97
1976	"Rock and Roll Music"	62
1981	"The Beach Boys Medley"	93
1988	"Kokomo"	42

==== Cash Box Year-End performances ====
Year	Song	Year-End position
1962	"Surfin' Safari"	31
1963	"Surfin' U.S.A."	16
1963	"Surfer Girl"	36
1964	"I Get Around"	4
1964	"Be True to Your School"	69
1965	"Help Me, Rhonda"	30
1965	"California Girls"	71
1966	"Sloop John B"	53
1966	"Barbara Ann"	44
1968	"Do It Again"	81
1981	"The Beach Boys Medley"	63
1988	"Kokomo"	39

== Other singles and associated songs ==
Year	Song	Peak chart positions										
Year	Song	US	US Cou	AUS	CAN	NOR	PHI	SWE	UK	NL	NZ	US Rock
1964	"Hawaii"	—	—	9	—	—	—	—	—	—	—	—
1964	"Little Honda"	65^{[Q]}	—	—	15	8	—	1	-	—	—	—
1964	"Wendy"	44^{[Q]}	—	—	—	—	—	—	—	—	—	—
1966	"Caroline, No" (as Brian Wilson)	32	—	—	16	—	—	—	—	—	—	—
1967	"Gettin' Hungry" (as Brian Wilson and Mike Love)	—	—	—	—	—	—	—	—	—	—	—
1974	"Wishing You Were Here" (with Chicago)	11	—	—	—	—	—	—	—	—	—	—
1978	"Almost Summer" (with Celebration)	28	—	—	30	—	—	—	—	—	—	—
1985	"California Girls" (with David Lee Roth)	3	—	—	6	8	—	—	68	44	7	3
1996	"Fun, Fun, Fun" (with Status Quo)	—	—	—	—	—	—	—	24	—	—	—
2011	"Don't Fight the Sea" (with Al Jardine) b/w "Friends" (a cappella) (non-album track)	—	—	—	—	—	—	—	—	—	—	—

== Extended plays ==
- Surfin' Safari (1963, SWE)
- Surfin' U.S.A. (1963, UK, FR, NZ)
- Shut Down Volume 2 (1963, US)
- Louie Louie (1964, FR)
- Beach Boys Concert (1964, UK)
- Fun, Fun, Fun (1964, UK, AUS) — #19 UK EPs
- Dance, Dance, Dance (1964, FR, ESP)
- 4-By The Beach Boys (1964, US, UK, POR) — #11 UK EPs
- Help Me, Rhonda (1965, POR, FR, ESP)
- Barbara Ann (1965, POR)
- Hits (1966, UK) — #1 UK EPs
- Then I Kissed Her (1966, POR)
- Sloop John B (1966, FR, ESP, POR)
- California Girls (1966, ESP)
- Wouldn't It Be Nice (1966, FR)
- God Only Knows (1966, UK) — #3 UK EPs
- Good Vibrations (1966, POR, SWE)
- Mountain Of Love (1967, ESP)
- White Christmas (1967, ESP)
- Wild Honey (1967, AUS)
- I Can Hear Music (1967, NZ)
- Cotton Fields (1970, BR)
- Sail On Sailor (1977, UK)
- Getcha Back (1985, UK)
- The Beach Boys Love Songs (2006)
- God Vibrations: 40th Anniversary (2006)
- Isn't It Time (2012)
- 1969: I'm Going Your Way (2019)
- Christmas Instrumentals (2022)

== Other album appearances ==
Year	Song	Album
1970	"Wouldn't It Be Nice" (live)	Celebration - The Big Sur Folk Festival 1970
1979	"It's a Beautiful Day"	Americathon
1984	"Chasin' the Sky"	Up the Creek
1988	"Kokomo"	Cocktail (Original Motion Picture Soundtrack)
1990	"Problem Child"	Problem Child
1991	"Crocodile Rock"	Two Rooms: Celebrating the Songs of Elton John & Bernie Taupin

== Guest appearances ==
Year	Song	Album
1963	"Surfin'" and "Surfin' Safari" (with Jan and Dean)	Jan And Dean Take Linda Surfin'
1964	"Little Deuce Coupe" (with Jan and Dean)	Drag City
1964	"The Monkey's Uncle" (with Annette Funicello)	Annette At Bikini Beach
1972	"Good Time" (with American Spring)	Spring
1984	"The Air That I Breathe" (with Julio Iglesias)	1100 Bel Air Place
1990	"G.T.O." (with Southern Pacific)	County Line
1993	"I Saw Mommy Kissing Santa Claus" (with Carnie Wilson and Wendy Wilson)	Hey Santa!
1996	"Howdy From Maui" (with Jeff Foxworthy)	Crank It Up - The Music Album
1996	"Winter Wonderland" (with Collin Raye)	Christmas: The Gift
2006	"FBI Wipe Out" (with Billy Hinsche)	Mixed Messages

== Music videos ==
Year	Title
1966	"Sloop John B"
1966	"Pet Sounds Promo Film"
1966	"Good Vibrations" (4 versions)
1967	"Surf's Up"
1968	"Friends"
1968	"Do It Again"
1968	"Bluebirds over the Mountain"
1969	"I Can Hear Music"
1969	"Break Away"
1970	"Cottonfields"
1971	"Don't Go Near the Water"
1971	"Long Promised Road"
1972	"You Need a Mess of Help to Stand Alone"
1976	"That Same Song"
1979	"Here Comes the Night"
1979	"Good Timin'"
1985	"Getcha Back"
1985	"It's Gettin' Late"
1986	"Rock 'n' Roll to the Rescue"
1986	"California Dreamin'"
1987	"Happy Endings" (with Little Richard)
1987	"Wipe Out" (with The Fat Boys)
1988	"Kokomo"
1989	"Still Cruisin'"
1990	"Somewhere Near Japan"
1990	"Problem Child"
1991	"Crocodile Rock"
1992	"Hot Fun in the Summertime"
1992	"Forever" (as Jesse & The Rippers)
1993	"Summer in Paradise"
1995	"Summer of Love"
1996	"Fun, Fun, Fun" (with Status Quo)
2011	"Do It Again" (2011 version)
2012	"That's Why God Made the Radio" (lyric video)
2012	"That's Why God Made the Radio"
2014	"California Feelin'"

== Television themes ==
- "Karen" — theme from the 1964–1965 NBC situation comedy Karen

== See also ==
- List of songs recorded by the Beach Boys

== Notes ==
- A Chart positions sourced from the 1972 re-release backed with Carl and the Passions — So Tough.
- B Chart positions are for the 1974 re-release of Wild Honey paired with 20/20.
- C Initially paired with a Pet Sounds re-release.
- D Chart position for the 1976 US release.
- E Canada's "Surfin' U.S.A." peak position is taken from the 1974 re-release.
- F "Marcella" did not enter the Billboard Hot 100, but peaked at No. 110 on the Bubbling Under Hot 100 Singles chart.
- G American and Canadian chart positions are for the 1975 re-release.
- H "Little Saint Nick" did not enter the Billboard Hot 100, but peaked at No. 3 on the Billboard Christmas Singles chart.
- I "Why Do Fools Fall in Love" did not enter the Billboard Hot 100, but peaked at No. 120 on the Bubbling Under Hot 100 Singles chart.
- J "She Knows Me Too Well" did not enter the Billboard Hot 100, but peaked at No. 101 on the Bubbling Under Hot 100 Singles chart.
- K "The Man With All the Toys" did not enter the Billboard Hot 100, but peaked at No. 3 on the Billboard Christmas Singles chart.
- L "Little Deuce Coupe" (with James House) peaked at No. 69 on Billboard's Hot Country Songs chart in the United States and at No. 31 on the CAN Country chart. The song did not chart on the main ("pop/rock") singles charts in either the United States or Canada.
- M Both songs also peaked at the same positions on Billboard's Country Airplay chart in the United States.
- N The 1975 reissue of "Barbara Ann" did not enter the Billboard Hot 100, but peaked at No. 101 on the Bubbling Under Hot 100 Singles chart.
- O The 1975 reissue of "Wouldn't It Be Nice" did not enter the Billboard Hot 100, but peaked at No. 103 on the Bubbling Under Hot 100 Singles chart.
- P "Surfin' USA" peaked at #36 on the Billboard Hot 100 when reissued in 1974 in conjunction with the Endless Summer compilation.
- Q "Wendy" and "Little Honda" charted on the Billboard Hot 100 " as tracks from the Capitol EP Four by The Beach Boys.
