= Spirit of America =

Spirit of America may refer to:

== Transport ==
- Spirit of America (automobile), land speed record-setting vehicles
- Spirit of America, a book of photography by Ken Duncan
- Spirit of America, the first B-2 Spirit bomber
- Spirit of America, a Goodyear GZ-20 blimp
- Spirit of America (cruise ship), a cruise ship owned and operated by Cruise West
- Spirit of America, a trimaran designed by Lock Crowther
- "The Spirit of America", a Massachusetts license plate slogan

== Music and film ==
- The Spirit of America, a 1963 documentary film
- Spirit of America (album), a 1975 compilation album by the Beach Boys
- "Spirit of America" (song), a 1963 song by The Beach Boys from their album Little Deuce Coupe
- "Spirit of America", a 1991 song by Samantha Fox from her album Just One Night (Samantha Fox album)

== Other uses ==
- Spirit of America (charity), a military non-profit based in the United States
- Spirit of America Festival Point Mallard Park, Decatur, Alabama
- the slogan of the U.S. commonwealth of Massachusetts

== See also ==
- Country Music: The Spirit of America, a 2003 documentary film
