= Becoming the Beach Boys =

Becoming the Beach Boys may refer to:

- Becoming the Beach Boys, 1961–1963, 2015 book
- Becoming the Beach Boys: The Complete Hite & Dorinda Morgan Sessions, 2016 compilation
