= Good Vibrations (disambiguation) =

"Good Vibrations" is a 1966 song by the Beach Boys that was written by Brian Wilson and Mike Love.

Good Vibration(s) may also refer to:

== Music ==
- Good Vibrations (record label), established in Northern Ireland in the 1970s
- Good Vibrations (musical), a 2005 stage show

=== Albums and songs ===
- Good Vibrations, a 1970 Beach Boys greatest hits compilation
- Good Vibrations – Best of The Beach Boys, 1975
- "Good Vibrations" (Marky Mark and the Funky Bunch song), 1991
- Good Vibrations: Thirty Years of The Beach Boys, 1993
- Good Vibrations (Party Animals album), 1996

== Books ==
- Good Vibrations: My Life as a Beach Boy, 2016 autobiography by Mike Love
- Good Vibrations: My Autobiography, by percussionist Evelyn Glennie

== Other ==
- Good Vibrations (sex shop), a sex-toy business operating from San Francisco since 1977
- Good Vibrations (miniseries), a 1992 Australian miniseries
- Good Vibrations (film), a 2013 film about the foundation of the record label

== See also ==
- Good Vibes (disambiguation)
- Pocket symphony
