= Rarities (The Beach Boys album) =

Compilation album by The Beach Boys
- Released: 1983
- Recorded: 1962–1970
- Genre: Rock
- Length: 30:25
- Label: Capitol
- Producer: Brian Wilson
- Compiler: Brad Elliot

The Beach Boys chronology
Sunshine Dream (1982)	Rarities (1983)	The Beach Boys (1985)

Rarities is a Beach Boys compilation album released in 1983 by Capitol Records. It is a collection of outtakes, alternate mixes and B-sides recorded between 1962 and 1970. Included are songs written or made popular by the Beatles, the Box Tops, Stevie Wonder, Ersel Hickey and Lead Belly. Also featured are several standards, such as "The Lord's Prayer" and "Auld Lang Syne". The album sold poorly and quickly went out of print.

== Track listing ==
1. "With a Little Help from My Friends" (John Lennon, Paul McCartney) – 2:22
2. "The Letter" (Wayne Carson) – 1:47
  - Box Tops cover. Included on the 2017 compilation 1967 – Sunshine Tomorrow
3. "I Was Made to Love Her" [alternate version] (Henry Cosby, Lula Mae Hardaway, Sylvia Moy, Stevie Wonder) – 2:34
  - Stevie Wonder cover. Original Beach Boys version from Wild Honey (1967). Alternate version later included on the 2017 compilation 1967 – Sunshine Tomorrow
4. "You're Welcome" (Brian Wilson) – 1:06
  - B-side of “Heroes and Villains” (1967); later included as a bonus track on the 1990 CD release of Smiley Smile/Wild Honey
5. "The Lord's Prayer" (Albert Hay Malotte) – 2:31
  - B-side of “Little Saint Nick” (1963); later included on the 1991 CD release of The Beach Boys' Christmas Album
6. "Bluebirds over the Mountain (two-track mix)" (Ersel Hickey) – 2:49
  - Found on the 1998 CD release of The Dutch Singles Collection
7. "Celebrate the News" (Dennis Wilson, Gregg Jakobson) – 3:03
  - B-side of “Break Away” (1969), later included as a bonus track on the 1990 CD release of Friends/20/20
8. "Good Vibrations" [alternate version] (B. Wilson, Mike Love) – 3:33
  - Found on the 2006 40th Anniversary CD single for Good Vibrations
9. "Land Ahoy" (B. Wilson) – 1:42
  - Found as a bonus track on the 1990 CD release of Surfin' Safari/Surfin' U.S.A.
10. "In My Room [German version]" (B. Wilson, Gary Usher) – 2:15
  - Found as a bonus track on the 1990 CD release of Surfer Girl/Shut Down Volume 2
11. "Cottonfields" (Lead Belly) – 3:02
  - Can be found on The Greatest Hits – Volume 2: 20 More Good Vibrations and the 1993 Good Vibrations: Thirty Years of The Beach Boys box set
12. "All I Want to Do" [live] (D. Wilson) – 1:39
  - Recorded in 1968; A longer version appears on 2013's box set Made in California
13. "Auld Lang Syne" (Traditional) – 1:11
  - Found on the 1991 CD release of The Beach Boys' Christmas Album

=== CD bonus tracks ===
14. "Medley: Good Vibrations/Help Me, Rhonda/I Get Around/Little Deuce Coupe/Little Honda/Hawaii/409/Noble Surfer/Dance, Dance, Dance/Shut Down/Surfin' Safari/Barbara Ann/Surfin' U.S.A./Fun, Fun, Fun" [Up Tempo Version] – 6:51
15. "Medley: Surfer Girl/Girls on the Beach/Ballad of Ole' Betsy/We'll Run Away/Caroline, No/The Surfer Moon/In My Room" [Ballad Version] – 9:39
16. "Beach Boys Medley: Good Vibrations/Help Me, Rhonda/I Get Around/Shut Down/Surfin' Safari/Barbara Ann/Surfin' U.S.A./Fun, Fun, Fun" [Single Version] – 4:10

== Reviews ==
Professional ratings
Review scores
Source	Rating
AllMusic	3/5 stars
Christgau's Record Guide	B+
Encyclopedia of Popular Music	3/5 stars
MusicHound	3.5/5

In a brief review, AllMusic's William Ruhlmann called Rarities a collection of "alternate takes, surprising cover versions, and different mixes of familiar songs make this a delight for collectors and hard-core fans. To anyone else, it's pleasant but non-essential."
