= Greatest Hits Volume Three: Best of the Brother Years 1970–1986 =

Greatest hits album by The Beach Boys
- Released: February 1, 2000
- Recorded: Autumn 1969 – Spring 1986
- Genre: Rock
- Length: 61:52
- Label: Capitol
- Producer: Brian Wilson, Carl Wilson, Bruce Johnston, Al Jardine, Steve Levine and Terry Melcher

The Beach Boys chronology
| The Greatest Hits – Volume 2: 20 More Good Vibrations (1999) | Greatest Hits Volume Three: Best of the Brother Years 1970–1986 (2000) | The Very Best of The Beach Boys (2001) |

Professional ratings
Review scores
| Source | Rating |
|---|---|
| AllMusic | 4/5 stars |
| Encyclopedia of Popular Music | 4/5 stars |

Greatest Hits Volume Three: Best of the Brother Years 1970–1986 is a compilation album of songs by American rock band The Beach Boys, released in 2000 by Capitol Records. It was released several months after its predecessors, The Greatest Hits – Volume 1: 20 Good Vibrations and The Greatest Hits – Volume 2: 20 More Good Vibrations.

Titled The Best of the Beach Boys: 1970–1986 in England, it included three additional songs not issued on the US version: "Tears in the Morning", the single edit of the disco remake of "Here Comes the Night", and "Sumahama", and dropped "Disney Girls". The albums failed to chart in either the US or UK.

== Track listing ==
| No. | Title | Writer(s) | Lead vocals | Length |
|---|---|---|---|---|
| 1. | "Add Some Music to Your Day" | Brian Wilson/Mike Love/Joe Knott | Mike Love, Bruce Johnston, Carl Wilson, Brian Wilson, Al Jardine | 3:34 |
| 2. | "Susie Cincinnati" (Single mix) | Al Jardine | Al Jardine | 2:57 |
| 3. | "This Whole World" | Brian Wilson | Carl Wilson | 1:56 |
| 4. | "Long Promised Road" | Carl Wilson/Jack Rieley | Carl Wilson | 3:30 |
| 5. | "Disney Girls (1957)" | Bruce Johnston | Bruce Johnston | 4:06 |
| 6. | "'Til I Die" | Brian Wilson | Group, Brian Wilson | 2:40 |
| 7. | "Surf's Up" | Brian Wilson/Van Dyke Parks | Carl Wilson, Brian Wilson | 4:12 |
| 8. | "Marcella" | Brian Wilson/Jack Rieley | Carl Wilson | 3:53 |
| 9. | "Sail On, Sailor" | Brian Wilson/Van Dyke Parks/Tandyn Almer/Ray Kennedy/Jack Rieley | Blondie Chaplin | 3:18 |
| 10. | "The Trader" | Carl Wilson/Jack Rieley | Carl Wilson | 5:05 |
| 11. | "California Saga (On My Way to Sunny Californ-i-a)" (Single mix) | Al Jardine | Brian Wilson, Mike Love | 3:15 |
| 12. | "Rock and Roll Music" (Single version) | Chuck Berry | Mike Love | 2:27 |
| 13. | "It's OK" (Single version) | Brian Wilson/Mike Love | Mike Love | 2:07 |
| 14. | "Honkin' Down the Highway" | Brian Wilson | Al Jardine | 2:47 |
| 15. | "Peggy Sue" | Jerry Allison/Norman Petty/Buddy Holly | Al Jardine | 2:15 |
| 16. | "Good Timin'" | Brian Wilson/Carl Wilson | Carl Wilson | 2:12 |
| 17. | "Goin' On" | Brian Wilson/Mike Love | Mike Love, Carl Wilson | 2:59 |
| 18. | "Come Go with Me" | C.E. Quick | Al Jardine | 2:07 |
| 19. | "Getcha Back" | Mike Love/Terry Melcher | Mike Love, Brian Wilson | 3:02 |
| 20. | "California Dreamin'" | John Phillips/Michelle Phillips | Al Jardine, Carl Wilson | 3:12 |
