= 20 Golden Greats (The Beach Boys album) =

Greatest hits album by The Beach Boys
- Released: June 1976
- Recorded: January 31, 1963 – April 23, 1969
- Genre: Rock, pop, surf, psychedelia
- Length: 51:40
- Label: Capitol
- Producer: Nick Venet, Brian Wilson, The Beach Boys

The Beach Boys chronology
Good Vibrations – Best of The Beach Boys (1975)	20 Golden Greats (1976)	15 Big Ones (1976)

Professional ratings
Review scores
Source	Rating
The Encyclopedia of Popular Music	4/5 stars

20 Golden Greats is a 1976 greatest hits album by the Beach Boys that was released in the UK by EMI's newly created TV advertising division. It became the second biggest selling album of the year, spending a total of 86 weeks on the UK Albums Chart and peaking at number one in July 1976, where it remained for 10 weeks.

== Track listing ==
Tracklist corresponds to the original LP release. The 1987 CD reissue has some small differences, most notably the replacement of various Duophonic mixes with mono versions.

Side one
No.	Title	Writer(s)	Original release	Length
1.	"Surfin' U.S.A."	Brian Wilson, Chuck Berry	Surfin' U.S.A., 1963	2:28
2.	"Fun, Fun, Fun"	B. Wilson, Mike Love	Shut Down Volume 2, 1964	2:03
3.	"I Get Around"	B. Wilson, Love	All Summer Long, 1964	2:13
4.	"Don't Worry Baby"	B. Wilson, Roger Christian	Shut Down Volume 2, 1964	2:48
5.	"Little Deuce Coupe"	B. Wilson, Christian	Surfer Girl, 1963	1:38
6.	"When I Grow Up (To Be a Man)"	B. Wilson, Love	The Beach Boys Today!, 1965	2:03
7.	"Help Me, Rhonda"	B. Wilson, Love	Summer Days (And Summer Nights!!), 1965	2:46
8.	"California Girls"	B. Wilson, Love	Summer Days (And Summer Nights!!), 1965	2:38
9.	"Barbara Ann"	Fred Fassert	Beach Boys' Party!, 1965	3:06
10.	"Sloop John B"	Trad. Arr. B. Wilson, Al Jardine	Pet Sounds, 1966	2:56
Total length:				24:39

Side two
No.	Title	Writer(s)	Year Originally Released	Length
1.	"You're So Good to Me"	B. Wilson, Love	Summer Days (And Summer Nights!!), 1965	2:16
2.	"God Only Knows"	B. Wilson, Tony Asher	Pet Sounds, 1966	2:51
3.	"Wouldn't It Be Nice"	B. Wilson, Asher, Love	Pet Sounds, 1966	2:22
4.	"Good Vibrations"	B. Wilson, Love	Appeared on Smiley Smile (1967), 1966	3:36
5.	"Then I Kissed Her"	Phil Spector, Ellie Greenwich, Jeff Barry	Summer Days (And Summer Nights!!), 1965	2:15
6.	"Heroes and Villains"	B. Wilson, Van Dyke Parks	Smiley Smile, 1967	3:37
7.	"Darlin'"	B. Wilson, Love	Wild Honey, 1967	2:12
8.	"Do It Again" (single version)	B. Wilson, Love	Appeared on 20/20 (1969), 1968	2:19
9.	"I Can Hear Music"	Jeff Barry, Greenwich, Phil Spector	20/20, 1969	2:38
10.	"Break Away"	B. Wilson, Murry Wilson	non-album single, 1969	2:55
Total length:				27:01

== Charts ==
=== Weekly charts ===
Chart (1976)	Peak position
Australian Albums (Kent Music Report)	26
Finnish Albums (Soumen Virallinen)	20
New Zealand Albums (RMNZ)	5
Norwegian Albums (VG-lista)	15
Swedish Albums (Sverigetopplistan)	40
UK Albums (OCC)	1

=== Year-end charts ===
Chart (1976)	Position
UK Albums (OCC)	2
Chart (1979)	Position
New Zealand Albums (RMNZ)	46

== Certifications and sales ==
Region	Certification	Certified units/sales
Austria (IFPI Austria)	Platinum	50,000^{*}
Germany (BVMI)	Gold	250,000^{^}
Switzerland (IFPI Switzerland)	Platinum	50,000^{^}
United Kingdom (BPI)	Platinum	1,100,000
^{*} Sales figures based on certification alone.^{^} Shipments figures based on certification alone.

== See also ==
- List of albums which have spent the most weeks on the UK Albums Chart
