= Spirit of America (song) =

Song by The Beach Boys

from the album Little Deuce Coupe
- Released: October 7, 1963
- Genre: Hot rod · pop
- Length: 2:23
- Label: Capitol
- Songwriter(s): Brian Wilson/Roger Christian
- Producer(s): Brian Wilson

"Spirit of America" is a song written by Brian Wilson and Roger Christian for the American rock band The Beach Boys. It was released on their 1963 album Little Deuce Coupe.

== Background ==
Frequent collaborator for The Beach Boys, Roger Christian, wrote the lyrics as a tribute to Craig Breedlove and his record-breaking Spirit of America car. Christian, had also written similar lyrics for "Ballad of Bonneville," a song for Gary Usher's band, The Super Stocks. Usher later said, "Roger would give Brian [Wilson], Jan [Berry] and I similar lyrics, and not tell us he was doing so! As it turned out, we wouldn't know this until the songs were released! The songs themselves, or the ideas, were much the same, even though they weren't copied. That was just how Roger did things."

The song also was included as the title track to the band's compilation album Spirit of America, the follow-up to their number one compilation album Endless Summer.

== Reception ==
AllMusic critic Matthew Greenwald said it was "[a]nother fine example of the Brian Wilson/Roger Christian songwriting team's car songs" and went on to say "it's still a somewhat obscure song in the Beach Boys' canon – something that doesn't diminish the quality of the song, despite its somewhat dated subject matter."

== Personnel ==
- Brian Wilson – lead vocals
