= Live in Chicago 1965 =

Live album by The Beach Boys
- Released: December 11, 2015
- Recorded: March 1965
- Genre: Rock
- Label: Capitol
- Producers: Alan Boyd; Mark Linett; Brian Wilson (original recordings)

The Beach Boys chronology
Beach Boys' Party! Uncovered and Unplugged (2015)	Live in Chicago 1965 (2015)	Becoming the Beach Boys: The Complete Hite & Dorinda Morgan Sessions (2016)

Live in Chicago 1965 is a live album by The Beach Boys, released on December 11, 2015. It was originally recorded in 1965.

== Background ==
The compilation's release was a result of revised European copyright laws, forcing some labels to publish unreleased archival material so that they would not lose their copyright. Live in Chicago 1965 is one of two such releases by Capitol Records in 2015, and the other was Beach Boys' Party! Uncovered and Unplugged.

== Track listing ==
First Show – Live at the Arie Crown Theater, Chicago – March 26, 1965

All tracks are written by Brian Wilson and Mike Love except where noted.

No.	Title	Writer(s)	Length
1.	"Intro"		1:00
2.	"Do You Wanna Dance"	Bobby Freeman	2:21
3.	"Little Honda"		2:23
4.	"Surfin' U.S.A."	B. Wilson, Chuck Berry	2:34
5.	"Don't Worry Baby"	B. Wilson, Roger Christian	3:10
6.	"Papa-Oom-Mow-Mow"	Carl White, Al Frazier, Sonny Harris, Turner Wilson Jr.	3:38
7.	"Monster Mash"	Bobby Pickett, Lenny Capizzi	3:02
8.	"Louie Louie"	Richard Berry	3:14
9.	"Hawaii"		2:35
10.	"Surfer Girl"	B. Wilson	2:30
11.	"Runaway"	Del Shannon, Max Crook	3:29
12.	"Shut Down"	B. Wilson, Roger Christian	1:54
13.	"Wendy"		3:02
14.	"Please Let Me Wonder"		3:45
15.	"Fun Fun Fun"		2:23
16.	"I Get Around"		2:08
17.	"Johnny B. Goode"	Chuck Berry	3:17
Total length:			46:35

Second Show – Live at the Arie Crown Theater, Chicago – March 27, 1965

All tracks are written by Brian Wilson and Mike Love except where noted.

No.	Title	Writer(s)	Length
1.	"Intro"		1:35
2.	"Do You Wanna Dance"	Bobby Freeman	2:35
3.	"Hawaii"		1:54
4.	"Please Let Me Wonder"		3:15
5.	"Surfer Girl"	B. Wilson	2:21
6.	"Runaway"	Del Shannon, Max Crook	2:27
7.	"Louie Louie"	Richard Berry	2:36
8.	"Fun Fun Fun"		3:10
9.	"409"	B. Wilson, Gary Usher, Mike Love	2:26
10.	"Shut Down"	B. Wilson, Roger Christian	1:46
11.	"Monster Mash"	Bobby Pickett, Lenny Capizzi	3:01
12.	"Surfin. USA"	B. Wilson, Chuck Berry	2:16
13.	"Little Honda"		2:06
14.	"Wendy"		2:46
15.	"In My Room"	B. Wilson, Gary Usher	2:58
16.	"Don't Worry Baby"	B. Wilson, Roger Christian	2:56
17.	"I Get Around"		2:52
18.	"Johnny B. Goode"	Chuck Berry	3:01
19.	"Papa-Oom-Mow-Mow"	Carl White, Al Frazier, Sonny Harris, Turner Wilson Jr.	3:22
Total length:			49:28

Rehearsals

All tracks are written by Brian Wilson and Mike Love except where noted.

No.	Title	Writer(s)	Length
1.	"Louie Louie"	Richard Berry	3:01
2.	"Little Honda"		2:30
3.	"Surfin' U.S.A."	B. Wilson, Chuck Berry	2:28
4.	"Wendy"		3:31
Total length:			11:33
