= Graduation Day 1966 =

Graduation Day 1966: Live at the University of Michigan

Live album by the Beach Boys
- Released: December 9, 2016
- Recorded: October 22, 1966
- Venue: University of Michigan
- Genre: Rock
- Label: Capitol
- Producer: Alan Boyd; Mark Linett; Brian Wilson (original recordings)

The Beach Boys chronology
Becoming the Beach Boys: The Complete Hite & Dorinda Morgan Sessions (2016)	Graduation Day 1966: Live at the University of Michigan (2016)	1967 – Sunshine Tomorrow (2017)

Graduation Day 1966 is a live album by the Beach Boys, released on December 9, 2016. It was originally recorded in 1966.

== Background ==
Since 2013, as a result of European Union copyright legislation passed that year, The Beach Boys have released various archival releases (most exclusive to digital downloads and streaming services, though some have also been offered in physical media formats like CDs and vinyl) featuring rarities, unreleased material, and other recordings that had not heretofore been officially released, all of which are fifty years old in that particular year, in order to extend the copyright on these recordings. The release was scheduled to extend the copyright of these recordings under EU law by 20 years; the EU protects recordings for 70 years only if they are formally released.

This show was part of the band's promotion tour of the album Pet Sounds in 1966; during that time Brian Wilson was working on the then-upcoming/unreleased album Smile.

On the night before, Brian flew out from Los Angeles to assist the band in rehearsing "Good Vibrations", which hadn't been played live before the three shows in Michigan. The album marks the second and third time the song was ever played live by the Beach Boys. As a result, the band taunts him out onto the stage for the second set's encore to play bass and provide vocals for Chuck Berry's "Johnny B. Goode".

== Track listing ==
All tracks are written by Brian Wilson and Mike Love, except where noted.

Live at the University of Michigan – Show 1
No.	Title	Writer(s)	Length
1.	"Help Me, Rhonda"		3:10
2.	"I Get Around"		2:25
3.	"Medley: Fun, Fun, Fun / Shut Down / Little Deuce Coupe / Surfin' U.S.A."	Brian Wilson, Mike Love, Roger Christian, Chuck Berry	3:51
4.	"Surfer Girl"	Brian Wilson	3:13
5.	"Papa-Oom-Mow-Mow"	Carl White, Al Frazier, Sonny Harris, Turner Wilson Jr.	3:00
6.	"You're So Good to Me"		2:25
7.	"You've Got to Hide Your Love Away"	John Lennon, Paul McCartney	3:32
8.	"California Girls"		2:42
9.	"Sloop John B."	Traditional; arranged by Brian Wilson	3:00
10.	"Wouldn't It Be Nice"	Brian Wilson, Mike Love, Tony Asher	2:10
11.	"God Only Knows"	Brian Wilson, Tony Asher	3:01
12.	"Good Vibrations"		4:37
13.	"Graduation Day"	Joe Sherman, Noel Sherman	4:04
14.	"Barbara Ann"	Fred Fassert	3:52

Live at the University of Michigan – Show 2
No.	Title	Writer(s)	Length
15.	"Help Me, Rhonda"		3:02
16.	"I Get Around"		2:24
17.	"Medley: Fun, Fun, Fun / Shut Down / Little Deuce Coupe / Surfin' U.S.A."	Brian Wilson, Mike Love, Roger Christian, Chuck Berry	3:49
18.	"Surfer Girl"	Brian Wilson	3:52
19.	"Papa-Oom-Mow-Mow"	White, Frazier, Harris, T. Wilson Jr.	2:22
20.	"You're So Good to Me"		2:16
21.	"You've Got to Hide Your Love Away"	Lennon, McCartney	3:34
22.	"California Girls"		5:07
23.	"Sloop John B."	Traditional; arranged by Brian Wilson	3:33
24.	"Wouldn't It Be Nice"	Brian Wilson, Mike Love, Tony Asher	3:27
25.	"God Only Knows"	Brian Wilson, Tony Asher	2:56
26.	"Good Vibrations"		5:09
27.	"Graduation Day"	Sherman, Sherman	3:59
28.	"Barbara Ann"	Fassert	3:55
29.	"Johnny B. Goode"	Berry	3:59

Bonus Tracks
No.	Title	Writer(s)	Length
30.	"KOMA Radio Spot"		0:14
31.	"Row, Row, Row Your Boat" (Live)	Traditional	0:36

== Personnel ==
The Beach Boys

- Brian Wilson - backing vocals and bass on "Johnny B. Goode"
- Mike Love – vocals; Electro-Theremin on "Good Vibrations"
- Al Jardine – vocals, rhythm guitar
- Carl Wilson – vocals, lead guitar (except "God Only Knows" and "Good Vibrations"), bass on "God Only Knows" and "Good Vibrations”
- Dennis Wilson – vocals, drums
- Bruce Johnston – vocals, bass (except "God Only Knows", "Good Vibrations", and "Johnny B. Goode"), organ on "God Only Knows" and "Good Vibrations”

Production staff

- Brian Wilson - producer (original recordings)
- Mark Linett - producer (2016)
- Alan Boyd - producer (2016)
