= Good Vibes =

Good Vibes may refer to:

== Television ==
- Good Vibes (Philippine TV series), a Philippine musical drama series
- Good Vibes (American TV series), an American animated television series on MTV

== Music ==
=== Albums ===
- Good Vibes (Gary Burton album), 1969
- Good Vibes (The Natural Four album), 1970
- Good Vibes (Johnny Lytle album)
- Good Vibes: Remixes

=== Songs ===
- "Good Vibes" (Alma song)
- "Good Vibes" (Nadav Guedj song)
- "Good Vibes" (Chris Janson song)

== See also ==
- Good Vibes Only (disambiguation)
- Good Vibrations (disambiguation)
- Vibes (disambiguation)
