= The Beach Boys Medley =

Single by The Beach Boys
- B-side: "God Only Knows"
- Released: July 1981
- Recorded: 1962 – 1966
- Length: 4:05
- Label: Capitol
- Songwriters: Brian Wilson; Mike Love; Roger Christian; Fred Fassert; Chuck Berry

The Beach Boys singles chronology
"Livin' with a Heartache" (1980)	"The Beach Boys Medley" (1981)	"Come Go with Me" (1981)

"The Beach Boys Medley" is a single containing a medley of popular Beach Boys songs from the 1960s, edited by John Palladino. Released in mid-1981, it capitalized on a medley craze begun by the Stars on 45 medleys. "The Beach Boys Medley" reached number 12 on the Billboard Hot 100, becoming the band's highest-charting hit in the United States in over five years. The single peaked at number 8 on the Cash Box sales chart. It also reached number 4 in New Zealand. "The Beach Boys Medley" was first released on an album a year later in 1982 on Sunshine Dream.

== Earlier medley ==
A Beach Boys medley entitled "Surf's Up", produced by South Florida musicians and engineer Chuck Kirkpatrick, was created months before the Palladino-produced medley and was actually submitted to Rupert Perry, head of A & R at Capitol (Kirkpatrick had been a Capitol artist himself in the late 70's). Perry's response was, "If we wanted to release a Beach Boys medley, we would simply use the original masters which we own". Kirkpatrick's medley began receiving heavy airplay on a Miami FM station, "Love 94", and that led to local and national TV coverage by "PM Magazine". Taking notice, Capitol quickly produced their own medley and launched a heavy promotional campaign entitled "Nothing is Better Than The Real Thing - The Beach Boys Medley on Capitol Records", effectively tanking Kirkpatrick's. The difference and uniqueness was that Kirkpatrick played every instrument and sang every vocal part himself, while Capitol's medley was simply tape edits of previous Beach Boys' studio masters. The similarity was in the sequencing of the songs in the two medleys - Capitol using very much the same as Kirkpatrick's.

== Songs ==
In order, the songs in the medley are:

1. "Good Vibrations"
2. "Help Me, Rhonda"
3. "I Get Around"
4. "Shut Down"
5. "Surfin' Safari"
6. "Barbara Ann"
7. "Surfin' U.S.A."
8. "Fun, Fun, Fun"

== Chart history ==
=== Weekly charts ===
Chart (1981)	Peak position
Australia (Kent Music Report)	16
Canada RPM Top Singles	15
Canada RPM Adult Contemporary	8
New Zealand (RIANZ)	4
US Billboard Hot 100	12
US Billboard Adult Contemporary	20
US Cash Box Top 100	8
U.S. Record World Singles Chart	5

=== Year-end charts ===
Chart (1981)	Rank
Australia (Kent Music Report)	87
Canada	87
New Zealand	43
US Billboard Hot 100	93
US Cash Box	63
