= Good Vibes Only =

Good Vibes Only may refer to:

- "Good Vibes Only" (The Real Housewives of Cheshire), a television episode
- "Good Vibes Only" (Among Us), a television episode
- "Good Vibes Only", an episode of Sweet Life: Los Angeles
- Good Vibes Only, an album by EES (rapper)
- "Good Vibes Only", a single by Gray (singer)

== See also ==
- Good Vibes (disambiguation)
