= The Spirit of America =

1963 film

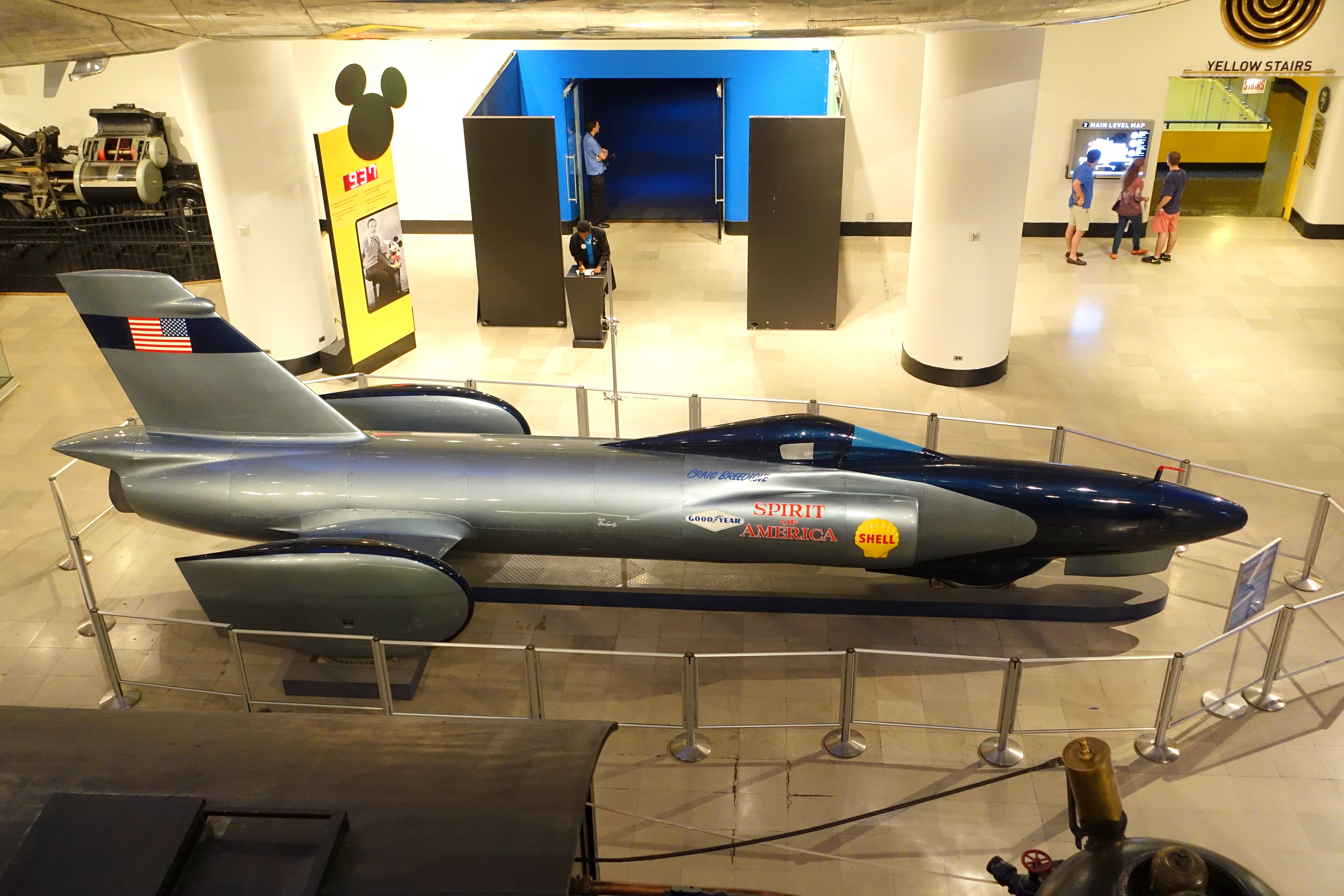
- Produced by: Algernon G. Walker
- Cinematography: Rexford L. Metz
- Edited by: Marvin Walowitz
- Distributed by: United States Information Agency
- Release date: 1963
- Country: United States
- Language: English

The Spirit of America is a 1963 American short documentary film produced by Algernon G. Walker about the Spirit of America. It was nominated for an Academy Award for Best Documentary Short.

== See also ==
- List of American films of 1963
