= Spirit of America (album) =

Greatest hits album by the Beach Boys
- Released: April 14, 1975
- Recorded: April 1962–April 1969
- Genre: Rock
- Length: 49:36
- Label: Capitol
- Producers: Brian Wilson, The Beach Boys and Nick Venet

The Beach Boys chronology
Endless Summer (1974)	Spirit of America (1975)	Good Vibrations – Best of The Beach Boys (1975)

Professional ratings
Review scores
Source	Rating
AllMusic	3.5/5 stars
Encyclopedia of Popular Music	4/5 stars
MusicHound	3/5

Spirit of America is a compilation album by the American rock band the Beach Boys. The follow-up to the compilation Endless Summer (1974), it was released on April 14, 1975, by Capitol Records. Although it features only a handful of genuine hits, instead composed of album tracks from the band's early LPs, Spirit of America proved to be another success for the Beach Boys' former label, reaching No. 8 in the US during a chart stay of 43 weeks and going gold.

== Content ==
After the success of its predecessor Capitol rounded up the few remaining early hits that were not released on Endless Summer, as well as some album tracks, in addition to two rare singles, "The Little Girl I Once Knew" (1965) and "Break Away" (1969). As with Endless Summer, Spirit of America was compiled and released while the Beach Boys were contracted to Reprise Records and, as such, is not considered an "official" album.

The song "Dance, Dance, Dance" featured in this album was also one of two Beach Boys tracks included in a promotional-only various artists compilation album issued by Capitol Records entitled "The Greatest Music Ever Sold" (Capitol SPRO-8511/8512), which was distributed to record stores during the 1976 Holiday season, as part of Capitol's "Greatest Music Ever Sold" campaign which promoted 15 "Best Of" albums that were released by the record label. "Help Me, Rhonda" (the retitled original "Help Me, Ronda") from "Endless Summer" was the other Beach Boys song included.

As with the Endless Summer compilation, the 2-record set was pressed with Sides 1 & 4 on one disc and Sides 2 & 3 on the other.

The Spirit of America cover art illustrator was Keith McConnell, who also provided the cover art for Endless Summer and the 1982 Beach Boys compilation Sunshine Dream.

== Track listing ==
All songs by Brian Wilson and Mike Love, except where noted.

Side 1
No.	Title	Original album	Length
1.	"Dance, Dance, Dance" (Brian Wilson/Carl Wilson/Mike Love)	The Beach Boys Today!, 1965	1:59
2.	"Break Away" (Brian Wilson/Reggie Dunbar)	1969 single	2:54
3.	"A Young Man Is Gone" (Bobby Troup/Mike Love)	Little Deuce Coupe, 1963	2:15
4.	"409" (Brian Wilson/Mike Love/Gary Usher)	Surfin' Safari, 1962	2:00
5.	"The Little Girl I Once Knew" (Brian Wilson)	non-album single	2:36
6.	"Spirit of America" (Brian Wilson/Roger Christian)	Little Deuce Coupe	2:23
Total length:			14:07

Side 2
No.	Title	Original album	Length
1.	"Little Honda"	All Summer Long, 1964	1:51
2.	"Hushabye" (D. Pomus/M. Shuman)	All Summer Long	2:40
3.	"Hawaii"	Surfer Girl, 1963	1:59
4.	"Drive-In"	All Summer Long	1:50
5.	"Good to My Baby"	The Beach Boys Today!	2:17
6.	"Tell Me Why" (John Lennon/Paul McCartney)	Beach Boys' Party!, 1965	1:38
Total length:			12:15

Side 3
No.	Title	Original album	Length
1.	"Do You Remember?"	All Summer Long	1:37
2.	"This Car of Mine"	Shut Down Volume 2, 1964	1:35
3.	"Please Let Me Wonder"	The Beach Boys Today!	2:45
4.	"Why Do Fools Fall in Love" (Frankie Lymon/Morris Levy)	Shut Down Volume 2	1:58
5.	"Custom Machine"	Little Deuce Coupe	1:38
Total length:			9:33

Side 4
No.	Title	Original album	Length
1.	"Barbara Ann" (Fred Fassert)	Beach Boys' Party!	2:07
2.	"Salt Lake City"	Summer Days (And Summer Nights!!), 1965	2:00
3.	"Don't Back Down"	All Summer Long	1:44
4.	"When I Grow Up (To Be a Man)"	The Beach Boys Today!	2:02
5.	"Do You Wanna Dance?" (Bobby Freeman)	The Beach Boys Today!	2:18
6.	"Graduation Day" (J. Sherman/N. Sherman)	Beach Boys Concert, 1964	3:30
Total length:			13:41

=== Other formats ===
Side 1 of the cassette version features all tracks from Sides 1 & 2 except "Tell Me Why", which was placed on Side 2 as the first track, followed by Sides 3 & 4.

The Capitol Records 8-track tape (8XWW-11384) running order differs from the LP and cassette, and is as follows:

PROGRAM 1: Dance, Dance, Dance : Break Away : A Young Man Is Gone : The Little Girl I Once Knew : Spirit Of America

PROGRAM 2: Little Honda : Hushabye : Hawaii : Drive-In : Good To My Baby : Tell Me Why

PROGRAM 3: 409 : Do You Remember? : This Car Of Mine : Please Let Me Wonder : Why Do Fools Fall In Love : Barbara Ann

PROGRAM 4: Custom Machine : Salt Lake City : Don't Back Down : When I Grow Up (To Be A Man) : Do You Wanna Dance? : Graduation Day

=== Reissues ===
The album was also released as a limited-edition Gold CD by DCC Compact Classics, catalog number GZS-1089. It was mastered by Steve Hoffman and included 2 bonus tracks: "Darlin" and "I Can Hear Music". In addition, the live recording of "Graduation Day" was substituted with the studio version.

== Charts ==
=== Weekly charts ===
Chart (1975)	Peak position
US Billboard 200	8

=== Year-end charts ===
Chart (1975)	Position
US Billboard 200	43
