= The Greatest Hits – Volume 1: 20 Good Vibrations =

Greatest hits album by The Beach Boys
- Released: April 4, 1995; September 21, 1999
- Recorded: April 1962–September 1966, Spring 1988 (Kokomo)
- Genre: Rock
- Length: 49:08
- Label: Capitol
- Producer: Murry Wilson, Brian Wilson and Terry Melcher

The Beach Boys chronology
The Capitol Years (1999)	The Greatest Hits – Volume 1: 20 Good Vibrations (1995)	The Greatest Hits – Volume 2: 20 More Good Vibrations (1999)

Professional ratings
Review scores
Source	Rating
AllMusic	5/5 stars
Encyclopedia of Popular Music	5/5 stars

The Greatest Hits – Volume 1: 20 Good Vibrations is a compilation album of songs by American rock band The Beach Boys, released in 1995 by Capitol Records. The album features The Beach Boys' biggest hits from 1962–1966, but also includes the 1988 No. 1 hit "Kokomo".

After the album was certified 2× platinum by the RIAA, Capitol made the decision to create sequels to the collection, so the original release was updated accordingly and reissued. The updated version was issued on September 21, 1999, the same day that its sequel, The Greatest Hits – Volume 2: 20 More Good Vibrations, appeared. On the 1999 reissue, the track listing is in chronological order, and the album versions of "Be True to Your School" and "Help Me, Rhonda" are replaced by the original single versions.

This collection is also notable for crediting Murry Wilson, not Nick Venet, as producer of "Surfin' Safari" and "409", while also modifying the credits of "Surfin' U.S.A." and "Shut Down" to reflect Brian Wilson's role as producer.

In March 2000, The Greatest Hits – Volume 1 charted at No. 95 in the United States and remained on the charts for 11 weeks, following the broadcast of the ABC TV movie The Beach Boys: An American Family.

== Track listing ==
=== 1995 version ===
All songs are by Brian Wilson and Mike Love, except where noted.

No.	Title	Writer(s)	Length
1.	"Surfin' Safari"		2:06
2.	"Surfin' USA"	Brian Wilson / Chuck Berry	2:29
3.	"Surfer Girl"	Brian Wilson	2:28
4.	"Little Deuce Coupe"	Brian Wilson / Roger Christian	1:39
5.	"Be True to Your School"		2:06
6.	"Fun, Fun, Fun"		2:04
7.	"I Get Around"		2:15
8.	"Shut Down"	Brian Wilson / Roger Christian	1:51
9.	"Dance, Dance, Dance"	Brian Wilson / Carl Wilson / Mike Love	2:00
10.	"Do You Wanna Dance?"	Bobby Freeman	2:19
11.	"Help Me, Rhonda"		3:10
12.	"California Girls"		2:38
13.	"Barbara Ann"	Fred Fassert	2:20
14.	"Sloop John B"	Traditional; arranged by Brian Wilson	2:59
15.	"Wouldn't It Be Nice"	Brian Wilson / Tony Asher / Mike Love	2:25
16.	"Good Vibrations"		3:37
17.	"409"	Brian Wilson / Mike Love / Gary Usher	2:00
18.	"God Only Knows"	Brian Wilson / Tony Asher	2:52
19.	"Catch a Wave"		2:09
20.	"Kokomo"	John Phillips / Mike Love / Terry Melcher / Scott McKenzie	3:37

=== 1999 version ===
All songs are by Brian Wilson and Mike Love and are mono single mixes, except where noted.

No.	Title	Writer(s)	Length
1.	"Surfin' Safari"		2:06
2.	"409"	Brian Wilson / Mike Love / Gary Usher	2:00
3.	"Surfin' USA"	Brian Wilson / Chuck Berry	2:28
4.	"Shut Down"	Brian Wilson / Roger Christian	1:50
5.	"Surfer Girl"	Brian Wilson	2:27
6.	"Little Deuce Coupe"	Brian Wilson / Roger Christian	1:50
7.	"Catch a Wave" (Mono album mix)		2:19
8.	"Be True to Your School"		2:07
9.	"Fun, Fun, Fun"		2:19
10.	"I Get Around"		2:14
11.	"Dance, Dance, Dance"	Brian Wilson / Carl Wilson / Mike Love	2:00
12.	"Do You Wanna Dance?"	Bobby Freeman	2:19
13.	"Help Me, Rhonda"		2:48
14.	"California Girls"		2:45
15.	"Barbara Ann"	Fred Fassert	2:09
16.	"Sloop John B"	Traditional; arranged by Brian Wilson	2:56
17.	"Wouldn't It Be Nice"	Brian Wilson / Tony Asher / Mike Love	2:24
18.	"God Only Knows"	Brian Wilson / Tony Asher	2:50
19.	"Good Vibrations"		3:37
20.	"Kokomo" (Stereo single mix)	John Phillips / Mike Love / Terry Melcher / Scott McKenzie	3:36

== Certifications ==
Region	Certification	Certified units/sales
France (SNEP)	Gold	100,000^{*}
^{*} Sales figures based on certification alone.
