= Becoming the Beach Boys, 1961–1963 =

2015 book by James B. Murphy

- Author: James B. Murphy
- Language: English
- Subject: The Beach Boys
- Publisher: McFarland & Company
- Publication date: 2015
- Publication place: United States
- Pages: 436
- ISBN: 9780786473656

Becoming the Beach Boys, 1961–1963 is a 2015 book covering the early years of the American rock band the Beach Boys, authored by American writer James B. Murphy. Dissatisfied with the inconsistent and sparse accounts of this period found in prior literature, Murphy spent eight years writing and researching the 436-page book, which includes 12 appendices, 1,100 end notes, a bibliography, and an index.

== Companion album ==
In August 2016, Omnivore Recordings issued an audio companion piece to the book in the form of the compilation Becoming the Beach Boys: The Complete Hite & Dorinda Morgan Sessions.

== Reception ==
In his review for the Association for Recorded Sound Collections, Robert Iannapollo deemed Becoming the Beach Boys to be the second-best book about the Beach Boys ever written, behind only Philip Lambert's Inside the Music of Brian Wilson. Iannapollo wrote, "There’s a lot to recommend this book. Murphy’s writing style is engaging and entertaining, not an easy thing to do when delving into the minutiae of music."
