= Good Vibrations – Best of the Beach Boys =

1975 greatest hits album by the Beach Boys

Good Vibrations – Best of The Beach Boys

Greatest hits album by the Beach Boys
- Released: June 30, 1975
- Recorded: July 1965–November 1972
- Genre: Rock
- Length: 36:54
- Label: Brother/Reprise
- Producers: Brian Wilson and The Beach Boys

The Beach Boys chronology
Spirit of America (1975)	Good Vibrations – Best of The Beach Boys (1975)	20 Golden Greats (1976)

Professional ratings
Review scores
Source	Rating
AllMusic	3.5/5 stars

Good Vibrations – Best of The Beach Boys is the sixth official compilation album by the Beach Boys, and the first on their Brother Records imprint. In June 1974, The Beach Boys' old label, Capitol Records, released a double-album compilation of the band's 1962–1965 hits titled Endless Summer, to capitalize on their popularity as a regular touring act. After the unofficial release became an unexpected commercial success, a follow-up, Spirit of America, was rushed out by Capitol in the spring of 1975 and was almost as successful. Wishing to capitalize on this commercial resurgence with an official release, on Brother Records, The Beach Boys issued Good Vibrations – Best of The Beach Boys.

The band had temporarily received the licensing rights to all their Capitol albums from Pet Sounds onwards, and was exclusively able to use post-1965 material, including their contemporary works, to create a more diverse collection. Released in June 1975, Good Vibrations – Best of The Beach Boys peaked at number 25 in the US. The two Capitol compilations proved more attractive to shoppers, however, and far outsold this collection.

== Track listing ==
Side 1
No.	Title	Original album	Length
1.	"Sail On, Sailor" (Brian Wilson/Tandyn Almer/Jack Rieley/Ray Kennedy/Van Dyke Parks)	Holland, 1973	3:18
2.	"Sloop John B" (Traditional; arranged by Brian Wilson)	Pet Sounds, 1966	2:56
3.	"God Only Knows" (B. Wilson/Tony Asher)	Pet Sounds	2:50
4.	"Darlin'" (B. Wilson/Mike Love)	Wild Honey, 1967	2:12
5.	"Add Some Music to Your Day" (B. Wilson/M. Love/Joe Knott)	Sunflower, 1970	3:34
6.	"Wouldn't It Be Nice" (B. Wilson/T. Asher/M. Love)	Pet Sounds	2:22

Side 2
No.	Title	Original album	Length
1.	"Good Vibrations" (B. Wilson/M. Love)	Smiley Smile, 1967	3:35
2.	"Do It Again" (B. Wilson/M. Love)	20/20, 1969	2:25
3.	"Caroline, No" (B. Wilson/T. Asher)	Pet Sounds	2:18
4.	"Friends" (B. Wilson/Carl Wilson/Dennis Wilson/Al Jardine)	Friends, 1968	2:30
5.	"Surf's Up" (B. Wilson/V.D. Parks)	Surf's Up, 1971	4:11
6.	"Heroes and Villains" (B. Wilson/V.D. Parks)	Smiley Smile	3:36

== Sources ==
- "The Nearest Faraway Place: Brian Wilson, The Beach Boys and the Southern California Experience", Timothy White, c. 1994.
- "Top Pop Singles 1955–2001", Joel Whitburn, c. 2002.
- "Top Pop Albums 1955–2001", Joel Whitburn, c. 2002.
