= Keepin' the Summer Alive =

Studio album by the Beach Boys
- Released: March 24, 1980
- Recorded: July 1, 1979 – March 20, 1980 (except "When Girls Get Together" and "Santa Ana Winds", 1969–1978)
- Studios: Criteria (Miami); Brother (Santa Monica); Western (Hollywood); Rumbo (Los Angeles); Al Jardine's barn (Big Sur)
- Length: 33:10
- Label: Brother/Caribou/CBS
- Producer: Bruce Johnston

The Beach Boys chronology
L.A. (Light Album) (1979)	Keepin' the Summer Alive (1980)	Ten Years of Harmony (1981)

Singles from Keepin' the Summer Alive
- 1. "Goin' On" / "Endless Harmony" Released: March 11, 1980; 2. "Livin' with a Heartache" / "Santa Ana Winds" Released: May 20, 1980; 3. "Keepin' the Summer Alive" / "When Girls Get Together" Released: June 14, 1980

Keepin' the Summer Alive is the 24th studio album by American rock band the Beach Boys, released March 24, 1980, on Brother, Caribou and CBS Records. Produced by Bruce Johnston, the album peaked at number 75 in the US, during a chart stay of 6 weeks, and number 54 in the UK. It is the group's last album to feature Dennis Wilson, who drowned in 1983, although he only appears on one song recorded in 1969.

The album included new material alongside several older songs that had not been released up until that point. Two of the new songs were written by Carl Wilson and Randy Bachman, the title track and "Livin' with a Heartache". The latter was released as a single alongside "Goin' On", written by Brian Wilson and Mike Love. Brian wrote or co-wrote five of the other seven tracks.

== Background and recording ==
After the band's previous album, L.A. (Light Album) (1979), failed to live up to commercial expectations, the executives at CBS expected another album as soon as possible. In July 1979, the Beach Boys convened at Western Studio in Los Angeles—the studio where most of the band's 1960s material had been produced by Brian Wilson—to begin work on a new studio album. The album was also recorded at various other studios, including former backing band member Daryl Dragon's Rumbo Recorders in San Fernando, and Al Jardine's recording studio in his Big Sur barn. Working titles included Cousins, Friends and Brothers, and Can't Wait Till Summer.

The group wanted Brian to return as their producer and felt that he would be more comfortable recording at the familiar studio environment of Western. They were briefly successful, as Carl Wilson said, "Brian got hot for about three days in the studio. He was singing like a bird. All the protection he usually runs just dropped; he came out of himself, he was right there in the room." Dennis Wilson, at odds with the rest of the group, abandoned the initial recording sessions, taking no further part in the album. The sessions were also stalled by Brian's desire to record only cover songs of rock n' roll tracks. One of these, Chuck Berry's "School Days", made it to the album.

In late August, Carl collaborated with Randy Bachman on the writing of four songs, two of which were included on the record, "Keepin' the Summer Alive" and "Livin' with a Heartache". Bachman declined an invitation to co-produce the album because he was struggling with personal issues. He later released his own version of "Keepin' the Summer Alive" with his short-lived band Union on their eponymous 1980 album.

In October 1979, the band reconvened with Bruce Johnston taking complete control of the album's production. The resulting album included a mixture of new songs alongside older unreleased songs. "When Girls Get Together" was recorded in 1969 and is the only song on the album with any involvement from Dennis. Johnston started writing "Endless Harmony" in 1972 as "Ten Years' Harmony". The earlier title and lyrics were used for a version by California Music in 1974. The band began recording "Santa Ana Winds" in 1978, revising and re-recording some of the song for this album. Sessions wrapped on February 14, 1980. Two outtakes, the original "Goin' to the Beach" and a cover of "Da Doo Ron Ron", were later released on the 2013 compilation Made in California.

In 2013, Johnston expressed dissatisfaction with the production of the title track, which he perceived as being weaker-sounding due to Carl's intervention. In 2020, Johnston elaborated, believing session guest and former bandmate Ricky Fataar’s drumming was inferior to session drummer Scott Mathews’ playing.

A promotional TV special on the making of the album, Going Platinum Presents the Beach Boys, aired on May 3, 1980 on Prism, and May 4 on Showtime.

== Outtakes ==
Still-unreleased tracks from the Keepin' the Summer Alive sessions include "Starbaby" and "Surfer Suzie", as well as renditions of "I'll Always Love You", "Jamaica Farewell", "Johnny B. Goode", "Little Girl", "Stranded in the Jungle", and "Smokey Places".

== Critical reception ==
Retrospective professional reviews
Review scores
Source	Rating
AllMusic	1.5/5 stars
Blender	1/5 stars
The Encyclopedia of Popular Music	1/5 stars
MusicHound	2/5 stars
(The New) Rolling Stone Album Guide	1/5 stars

In a retrospective review for AllMusic, Rob Theakston referred to Keepin' the Summer Alive as "the low point" in the band's discography: "Ripe with mindless throwaways and lifeless filler ... The two exceptions to the rule reside in the title track and the closing 'Endless Harmony.'" In (The New) Rolling Stone Album Guide, the album is cited as an "abysmal" entry in "a string of inconsequential records" that had not abated since 1978's M.I.U. Album.

== Track listing ==
Side one
No.	Title	Writer(s)	Lead vocals	Length
1.	"Keepin' the Summer Alive"	Carl Wilson, Randy Bachman	Carl Wilson	3:43
2.	"Oh Darlin'"	Brian Wilson, Mike Love	C. Wilson and Mike Love	3:52
3.	"Some of Your Love"	B. Wilson, Love	Love and C. Wilson	2:36
4.	"Livin' with a Heartache"	C. Wilson, Bachman	C. Wilson	4:06
5.	"School Day (Ring! Ring! Goes the Bell)"	Chuck Berry	Al Jardine	2:52

Side two
No.	Title	Writer(s)	Lead vocals	Length
1.	"Goin' On"	B. Wilson, Love	Love, C. Wilson and Brian Wilson	3:00
2.	"Sunshine"	B. Wilson, Love	Love, B. Wilson and C. Wilson	2:52
3.	"When Girls Get Together"	B. Wilson, Love	Love and B. Wilson	3:31
4.	"Santa Ana Winds"	B. Wilson, Al Jardine	Jardine, Love and C. Wilson	3:14
5.	"Endless Harmony"	Bruce Johnston	Bruce Johnston and C. Wilson	3:10
Total length:				33:10

== Personnel ==
Adapted from 2000 liner notes and Craig Slowinski.

The Beach Boys

- Brian Wilson – vocals, tack piano on “Oh Darlin’” and “Goin’ On”, keyboards on “Sunshine”, piano and Rocksichord on “When Girls Get Together”
- Carl Wilson – vocals, lead guitar on “Keepin’ the Summer Alive”, guitar on “Oh Darlin’” and “Livin’ With a Heartache”, tack piano on “Keepin’ the Summer Alive”, Yamaha electric piano on “Livin’ With a Heartache”, keyboards on “Sunshine”
- Al Jardine – vocals, acoustic guitars and spoken word [[introduction] on “Santa Ana Winds”; rhythm guitar on “School Day” (uncertain)
- Mike Love – vocals
- Bruce Johnston – vocals, Fender Rhodes, clavichord on “School Day”, keyboards on “Sunshine”
- Dennis Wilson – bass drum on “When Girls Get Together”

Additional musicians

- Terry Melcher, Curt Boettcher, Jon Joyce – harmony and backing vocals on “Livin’ With a Heartache”
- Joe Walsh – slide and rhythm guitars on “Keepin’ the Summer Alive”
- Steve Ross – guitar
- Bill House – guitar; acoustic guitars on “Oh Darlin’”
- Caleb Quaye – lead and rhythm guitars on “School Day”, guitar on “Sunshine”
- Billy Joe Walker, Jr. – lead and acoustic guitars on “Livin’ With a Heartache”
- Dennis Budimir – guitar on “School Day”
- Tim May – guitar on “School Day”
- Al Vescovo – guitar on “When Girls Get Together”
- Bryan Garofalo – harmony and backing vocals on “Keepin’ the Summer Alive” and “Endless Harmony”, bass
- Jerry Scheff – bass on “Oh Darlin’”
- Ray Pohlman – bass on “School Day” and “When Girls Get Together”, mandolin on “When Girls Get Together”
- Lyle Ritz – double bass on “Santa Ana Winds”
- John Hobbs – keyboards
- Daryl Dragon – keyboards on “Some of Your Love” and marxophone on “When Girls Get Together”
- Don Randi – keyboards on “School Day”
- Mike Meros – keyboards on “School Day”
- Carli Muñoz – organ on “School Day”
- Ricci Martin – keyboards on “Sunshine” and piano on “Endless Harmony”
- Scott Mathews – drums; harmony and backing vocals on “Goin’ On”, percussion on “When Girls Get Together” and “Endless Harmony”
- Ricky Fataar – drums on “Keepin’ the Summer Alive” and “Sunshine”
- Gary Mallaber – drums on “Livin’ With a Heartache” and percussion on “Sunshine”
- Hal Blaine – drums on “School Day”
- Steve Forman – percussion
- Gene Estes – tympani on “When Girls Get Together”
- Steve Douglas – saxophone on “Oh Darlin’”, “Goin’ On”, and “Sunshine”
- Joel Peskin – saxophone on “Oh Darlin’”, “Goin’ On”, and “Sunshine”; baritone saxophone on “Some of Your Love”
- Dick “Slyde” Hyde – trombone on “Oh Darlin’”, “Goin’ On”, and “Sunshine”
- Chuck Findley – flugelhorn on “Oh Darlin’”, trumpet on “Goin’ On” and “Sunshine”
- Lew McCreary – trombone and bass trombone on “When Girls Get Together”
- Jim Horn – baritone saxophone on “When Girls Get Together”
- Vince Charles, Efrain Toro, Ray Armando – steel drums on “Sunshine”
- David Sherr – oboe on “When Girls Get Together”
- Alexander Neiman, Darrell Terwilliger – violas on “When Girls Get Together”
- Armand Kaproff, Jan Kelley, Harold Bemko, Douglas Davis – cellos on “When Girls Get Together”
- Tommy Morgan – harmonica on “Santa Ana Winds”
- Igor Horoshevsky, Raymond Kelley – cellos on “Santa Ana Winds”
- James Getzoff, Murray Adler, Bonnie Douglas, Paul Shure, Alfred Breuning, Marshall Sosson, Endre Granat, Spiro Stamos – violins on “Santa Ana Winds”
- Harry Hyams, Samuel Boghossian – violas on “Santa Ana Winds”

Arrangements

- Bob Alcivar – horn arrangements
- Harry Betts – string arrangements

Technical personnel

- Bruce Johnston – producer (except “When Girls Get Together”)
- Brian Wilson – producer (“School Day”, “When Girls Get Together”, “Santa Ana Winds”)
- Al Jardine – producer (“School Day” and “Santa Ana Winds”)
- Carl Wilson – producer (“Keepin’ the Summer Alive” and “Livin’ with a Heartache”)
- Steve Desper – chief engineer, mixing
- Chuck Leary – engineer (“Santa Ana Winds”)
- Chuck Britz – engineer (“Oh Darlin’”, “School Day”, “Santa Ana Winds”)
- Rodney Pearson – engineer
- Brian Behrns – second engineer

Artwork

- John Alvin – illustration
- Tony Lane – art direction
- Gary Nichamin – photography

== Charts ==
Chart (1980)	Peak position
UK Top 40 Album Chart	54
US Billboard 200 Albums	75
