= The Greatest Hits – Volume 2: 20 More Good Vibrations =

Greatest hits album by The Beach Boys
- Released: September 21, 1999
- Recorded: July 1963–August 1969
- Genre: Rock
- Length: 51:12
- Label: Capitol
- Producers: Brian Wilson, Carl Wilson, Bruce Johnston, Murry Wilson and Al Jardine

The Beach Boys chronology
The Greatest Hits – Volume 1: 20 Good Vibrations (1999)	The Greatest Hits – Volume 2: 20 More Good Vibrations (1999)	Greatest Hits Volume Three: Best of the Brother Years 1970–1986 (2000)

Professional ratings
Review scores
Source	Rating
AllMusic	5/5 stars
Encyclopedia of Popular Music	4/5 stars

The Greatest Hits – Volume 2: 20 More Good Vibrations is a compilation album of songs by American rock band The Beach Boys, released in 1999 by Capitol Records. It was issued as a companion piece to The Greatest Hits – Volume 1: 20 Good Vibrations, on the same day.

The collection includes early classics that were omitted from the first volume, such as "In My Room" and "Don't Worry Baby", but also covers tracks from their less commercially successful period of 1967–1970, ranging from "Heroes and Villains" to the Al Jardine-produced "Cottonfields", the latter a European hit in the summer of 1970.

As on the first volume, the production credits on this album were revised: although originally credited to The Beach Boys, the songs "Heroes and Villains", "Wild Honey", "Darlin'" and "Friends" are now credited as produced by Brian Wilson.

In March 2000, The Greatest Hits – Volume 2 charted at No. 192 in the United States, following the broadcast of the ABC TV movie The Beach Boys: An American Family.

== Track listing ==
All songs by Brian Wilson and Mike Love, except where noted. All tracks are mono single mixes, except where noted.

1. "In My Room" (Brian Wilson, Gary Usher) – 2:11
2. "The Warmth of the Sun" – 2:50
3. "Don't Worry Baby" (Brian Wilson, Roger Christian) – 2:50
4. "All Summer Long" (mono album mix) – 2:06
5. "Wendy" – 2:23
6. "Little Honda" – 1:50
7. "When I Grow Up (To Be a Man)" – 2:02
8. "Please Let Me Wonder" – 2:45
9. "You're So Good to Me" – 2:14
10. "The Little Girl I Once Knew" – 2:36
11. "Caroline, No" (Brian Wilson, Tony Asher) – 2:17
  - Single version, without passing train/barking dogs coda
12. "Heroes and Villains" (Brian Wilson, Van Dyke Parks) – 3:37
13. "Wild Honey" – 2:37
14. "Darlin'" – 2:12
15. "Friends" (Brian Wilson, Dennis Wilson, Carl Wilson, Al Jardine) – 2:30
  - Single version, mono
16. "Do It Again" – 2:18
  - Single version, without workshop effects coda
17. "Bluebirds Over the Mountain" (Ersel Hickey) – 2:51
18. "I Can Hear Music" (stereo single mix) (Jeff Barry, Ellie Greenwich, Phil Spector) – 2:38
19. "Break Away" (stereo single mix) (Brian Wilson, Reggie Dunbar) – 2:55
20. "Cottonfields" (Huddie Ledbetter) – 3:04
