= Scott Mathews =

American record producer

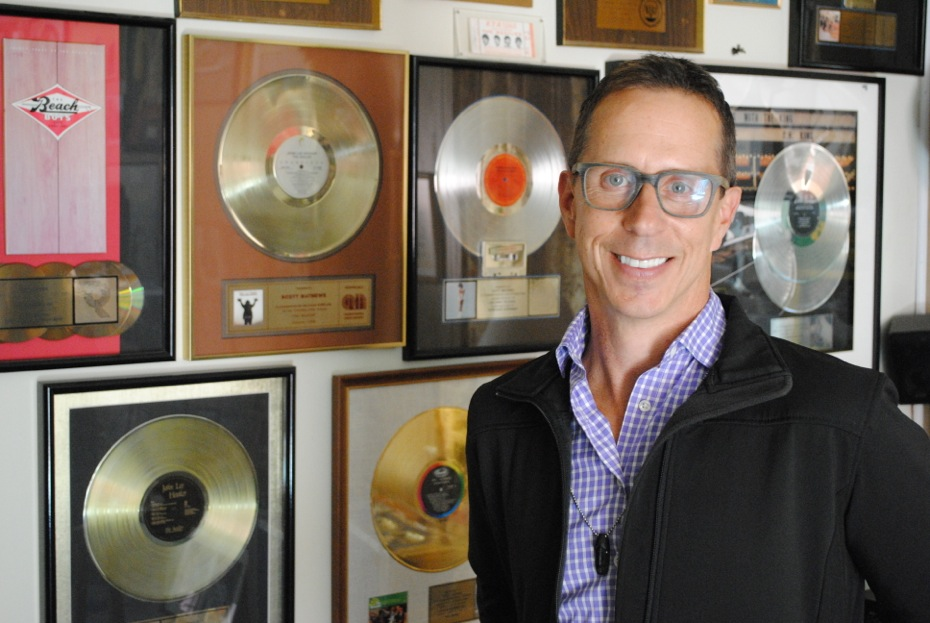
- Scott Mathews at TikiTown, USA
- Born: July 25, 1955 (age 71); Sacramento, California, United States
- Occupations: Music producer, composer, multi-instrumentalist, vocalist, entertainment media executive, entrepreneur
- Website: scottmathews.com

Scott Mathews (born July 25, 1955) is an American music producer, composer, performer, and entrepreneur. He has appeared as a musician, songwriter or producer on recordings with sales of more than 50 million units which earned more than 30 gold and multi-platinum RIAA Certification awards.

As a recording artist, he recorded for Capitol Records and established the video department at Capitol just prior to MTV. Mathews owns and operates a private studio, TikiTown, along with four production and publishing companies.

== Early career ==
Mathews began playing music at a young age. At age 15, he got his first break playing with Elvin Bishop at San Francisco's Fillmore Auditorium.

In 1973, Mathews met future long-time collaborator Ron Nagle. Nagle was already an established songwriter and recording artist for Warner Brothers, best known at the time for his 1970 album Bad Rice. Nagle and Mathews teamed up and began to write and record material in Nagle's garage studio in San Francisco. Turning 18, Mathews moved to Sausalito, California, sharing a house with David Jenkins of Pablo Cruise, making a living as a session musician while writing and producing 'blueprints for records' with Nagle.

Mathews soon began producing radio and television jingles for various ad agencies. This led to Roy Orbison being the first notable artist Mathews produced in the recording studio. Mathews convinced an advertising agency he could get Orbison to license his biggest worldwide hit, Oh, Pretty Woman for Tone, a women's body soap manufactured by The Dial Corporation. The campaign was such a success that Mathews followed it up with Johnny Cash on Victoria Station radio ads.

Ron Nagle's producer from his solo record, Jack Nitzsche, heard some of the duo's new material and hired them to work on film scores and record projects. In Nitzsche, Mathews found his mentor in the music business and high-profile projects followed soon after.

Performing and producing sessions under Nitzsche, Mathews worked on his first movie soundtrack, One Flew Over the Cuckoo's Nest, and was Nitzsche's multi-instrumentalist and close assistant on various recording projects with major artists such as Mick Jagger, Barbra Streisand, Glen Campbell, Ry Cooder, Dr. John.

In 1977, Barbra Streisand heard one of Mathews and Nagle's songs at a meeting with Jack Nitzsche. She asked to meet with the two composers and the three began writing together in a bungalow at The Beverly Hills Hotel. They wrote "Don't Believe What You Read" for Streisand's album Superman which went double-platinum in the United States. Mathews also assisted Nitzsche in writing the arrangements for the album. Mathews and Nagle also wrote and published songs by The Tubes including the cult favorite, "Don't Touch Me There". Also in 1977, Mathews played drums and dobro on Glen Campbell's album Southern Nights on Capitol Records and worked with Nitzsche on the arrangements of several songs.

Robin Williams contacted Mathews to help with a musical finale for his shows in San Francisco at The Boarding House. Following that success, Williams took the show to New York at the Copacabana. Mathews urged Williams to record some shows, which led to a record deal with Casablanca Records. The result was an Reality ... What a Concept, the first Grammy Award winning project for both Williams and Mathews.

Mathews was a studio musician on the Beach Boys album Keepin' the Summer Alive.

== Acting ==
Mathews starred as Fluke Starbucker in the 1977 Star Wars parody Hardware Wars. It was highly profitable, grossing in excess of $1,000,000 on a paltry $8,000 budget. George Lucas said in a 1999 interview on the UK's The Big Breakfast television show that Hardware Wars was his favorite Star Wars parody. In 2003, the film was honored by Lucasfilm when it was given the Pioneer Award at that year's The Official Star Wars Fan Film Awards. In August 2010, Time magazine listed it as one of the top 10 Star Wars fanfilms.

== Dūrocs ==
Following Mathews' writing and production work with artists on A&M Records, Capitol Records approached him and Nagle to build a band project. Nagle and Mathews, funded by A&M, wrote and produced material under the name Dūrocs. The duo ended up signing with Capitol Records as a production company to produce artists already on the label and/or new artists they brought in. Capitol's Artists and repertoire division pushed for Mathews and Nagle to record their own album as the first project with the label and the duo agreed although the so-called 'band', Durocs, but never had any intention of performing live.

Originally labeled as new wave and power pop, Dūrocs wrote and produced material that was more diverse and explored Mathews and Nagle's interests in the styles of The Brill Building, Leiber and Stoller and Phil Spector.

Durocs did not assemble a band to tour in support of the album. En lieu of touring, they produced music videos for their two singles. Dūrocs left Capitol late in 1980 to focus on production and songwriting for other artists. In 1981 the video department Dūrocs helped Capitol build thrived as the label was prepared to make promotional videos for the new MTV television channel. The song "Lie to Me" was featured on the 1980 WKRP in Cincinnati episode "A Family Affair".

After negotiations with Capitol Records, Real Gone Music released the original Dūrocs record in 2012. The Durocs negotiated for a limited edition vinyl series to be released exactly 33 1/3 years (representing the RPMs of an album) after the original record. Along with the original LP are eight previously unheard Dūrocs 'bone-us' tracks, all recorded shortly after the Capitol release.

== Other work ==
In 1989, Mathews recorded vocals on Todd Rundgren's Nearly Human and joined Rundgren on tour. He performed multi-instruments and vocals on Todd Rundgren's Live in Chicago '91.

Mathews and Nagle co-wrote the 1990 title song to Dave Edmunds Closer to the Flame.

In 1991, Mathews moved to Marin County and founded Hit or Myth Productions, Inc. Mathews hired his own A&R staff for recruiting primarily emerging artists and bought a split level house in Mill Valley, CA on the edge of San Francisco Bay which became his private recording studio, TikiTown, named for the enormous Tiki statues that surround it. Van Morrison was one of the first artists Mathews brought into the studio and he loved it so much he set up an entire large room as a gym so he could work out while there. TikiTown is renowned for its museum level quality of music memorabilia and rare Hall of Fame quality pieces.

In 1993 Mathews and music journalist Joel Selvin met with Dick Dale in Twentynine Palms, CA. Their meeting convinced Dale to come out of retirement and record with Mathews. Dale experienced a renewed interest in his music and earned the #1 college radio record for his Tribal Thunder comeback LP which Mathews co-produced.

In December 2011, Mathews signed on as executive producer with the Hong Kong-based, Far West Entertainment. Less than two months after, Mathews produced the #1 Billboard track "Dance On" with Pan Asian girl group Blush.

On January 24, 2014, Mathews helped arrange for his longtime friend, Hal Blaine to be inducted at the 29th annual TEC Awards Hall of Fame at the NAMM Show in Anaheim, California. The evening provided a reunion with Todd Rundgren who won the Les Paul Award for his musical innovation.

On October 19, Mathews was honored with a Milley Award, a local Bay Area award for 'recognition and appreciation for his outstanding achievement in performing, creating and demonstrating his significant body of work, service to the arts community and artistic vision, diligence and perseverance.' Upon receiving the award, he stated; "It has been at least a couple lifetime's of great fortune and I'm most grateful for it. I have been able to live quite comfortably in the Bay Area, hermetically sealed in the recording studio, creating new music rather than re-creating it on stage and living the life of a carny. But I don't think the past can possibly provide what the future promises and deeply feel my best work is ahead of me. The rearview mirror is so much smaller than the windshield."

== Charitable work ==
Mathews serves as Chairman of the San Francisco Bay Area Council of Little Kids Rock which provides a nationwide program of free musical education and instruments to impoverished public schools.
