= Goin' On =

Single by The Beach Boys

from the album Keepin' the Summer Alive
- B-side: "Endless Harmony"
- Released: March 11, 1980
- Genre: Pop
- Length: 3:00
- Label: Caribou Records
- Songwriters: Brian Wilson, Mike Love
- Producer: Bruce Johnston

The Beach Boys singles chronology
"It's a Beautiful Day" (1979)	"Goin' On" (1980)	"Livin' with a Heartache" (1980)

"Goin' On" is a song written by Brian Wilson and Mike Love for the American rock band The Beach Boys. It was released on their 1980 album Keepin' the Summer Alive. The single reached number 83 on the Billboard Hot 100.

Record World said that "The Beach Boys have created a majestic ballad that's a perfect piece to usher in the warm weather."

== Personnel ==
Adapted from 2000 liner notes and Craig Slowinski.

=== Goin’ On ===
The Beach Boys

- Brian Wilson – vocals, tack piano
- Carl Wilson – vocals
- Al Jardine – vocals
- Mike Love – vocals
- Bruce Johnston – vocals, Fender Rhodes electric piano, producer

Additional musicians and production staff

- Steve Ross – guitar
- Bill House – guitars
- Bryan Garofalo – bass
- John Hobbs – keyboards
- Scott Mathews – harmony and backing vocals, drums
- Steve Forman – timpani
- Steve Douglas – saxophone and saxophone solo
- Joel Peskin – saxophone
- Dick “Slyde” Hyde – trombone
- Chuck Findley – trumpet
- Bob Alcivar – horn arrangements
- Steve Desper – engineer, mixing

=== Endless Harmony ===
The Beach Boys

- Brian Wilson – harmony and backing vocals
- Carl Wilson – lead vocals, harmony and backing vocals
- Al Jardine – harmony and backing vocals
- Mike Love – harmony and backing vocals
- Bruce Johnston – lead vocals, harmony and backing vocals, Fender Rhodes electric pianos, producer

Additional musicians and production staff

- Steve Ross – guitar
- Bill House – guitars
- Bryan Garofalo – harmony and backing vocals, bass
- Ricci Martin - piano
- Scott Mathews – drums, percussion
- Steve Forman – percussion
- Steve Desper – engineer, mixing
