= Livin' with a Heartache =

Single by The Beach Boys

from the album Keepin' the Summer Alive
- B-side: "Santa Ana Winds"
- Released: May 21, 1980
- Recorded: August–December 1979
- Genre: Pop, country
- Length: 3:05 (single); 4:06 (album)
- Label: Caribou Records
- Songwriters: Carl Wilson, Randy Bachman
- Producer: Bruce Johnston

The Beach Boys singles chronology
"Goin' On" (1980)	"Livin' with a Heartache" (1980)	"The Beach Boys Medley" (1981)

"Livin' with a Heartache" is a song written by Carl Wilson and Randy Bachman for the American rock band the Beach Boys, one of two collaborations between the two writers. It was recorded from August 27–29 at Bachman's home studio known as "The Barn" in Lynden, Washington with two further sessions at Rumbo Studios in November and December 1979. "Livin' with a Heartache" was released on the Beach Boys' 1980 album Keepin' the Summer Alive and was subsequently released with a truncated 3:05 mix as a single backed with "Santa Ana Winds" which failed to chart in the US.

Record World called it a "gem" and said that the "melody & hook are perfect."

== Performers ==
Adapted from 2000 liner notes and Craig Slowinski.

=== Livin’ with a Heartache ===
The Beach Boys

- Carl Wilson – lead vocals, guitar, Yamaha electric piano, uncredited producer
- Bruce Johnston – harmony and backing vocals, producer

Additional musicians and production staff

- Terry Melcher, Curt Boettcher, Jon Joyce – harmony and backing vocals
- Billy Joe Walker Jr. – lead and acoustic guitars
- Bryan Garofalo – bass
- John Hobbs – tack piano
- Gary Mallaber – drums
- Steve Forman – percussion
- Steve Desper – engineer, mixing

=== Santa Ana Winds ===
The Beach Boys

- Brian Wilson – harmony and backing vocals, producer
- Carl Wilson – harmony and backing vocals, additional lead vocals
- Al Jardine – lead vocals, harmony and backing vocals, acoustic guitars, spoken word introduction, producer
- Mike Love – harmony and backing vocals, additional lead vocals
- Bruce Johnston – harmony and backing vocals, producer

Additional musicians

- Lyle Ritz – double bass
- Steve Forman – brushed snare drum and timpani
- Tommy Morgan – harmonica
- Igor Horoshevsky, Raymond Kelley – cellos
- James Getzoff, Murray Adler, Bonnie Douglas, Paul Shure, Alfred Breuning, Marshall Sosson, Endre Granat, Spiro Stamos – violins
- Harry Hyams, Samuel Boghossian – violas
- Harry Betts – string arrangements
- Steve Desper – chief engineer, mixing
- Chuck Leary – engineer
- Chuck Britz – engineer
