= Sunshine Dream =

Greatest hits album by The Beach Boys
- Released: June 1982 (US)
- Recorded: 1964–1969
- Genre: Rock
- Length: 63:12
- Label: Capitol

The Beach Boys chronology
Ten Years of Harmony (1981)	Sunshine Dream (1982)	Rarities (1983)

Professional ratings
Review scores
Source	Rating
AllMusic	2/5 stars
Encyclopedia of Popular Music	3/5 stars

Sunshine Dream is the third double-album compilation of the Beach Boys' music to be compiled by their former label, Capitol Records (following the earlier Endless Summer and Spirit of America). Released in 1982, the album features singles and album tracks ranging from 1964 to 1969, and it is the first time "The Beach Boys Medley" appears on an album; it reached number 12 in 1981 as a single. The album was compiled and released while the Beach Boys were contracted with CBS Records. Due to the appearance of more recent compilations, Sunshine Dream has long since been out of print.

== Track listing ==
All songs by Brian Wilson and Mike Love, except where noted.

Side 1
No.	Title	Original album	Length
1.	"I Can Hear Music" (Jeff Barry, Ellie Greenwich, Phil Spector)	20/20, 1969	2:36
2.	"Here Today" (Brian Wilson, Tony Asher)	Pet Sounds, 1966	2:52
3.	"Darlin'"	Wild Honey, 1967	2:12
4.	"Caroline, No" (Brian Wilson, Tony Asher)	Pet Sounds	2:16
5.	"Aren't You Glad"	Wild Honey	2:16
6.	"Good Vibrations"	Smiley Smile, 1967	3:36

Side 2
No.	Title	Original album	Length
1.	"Wouldn't It Be Nice" (Brian Wilson, Tony Asher, Mike Love)	Pet Sounds	2:22
2.	"Friends" (Brian Wilson/Carl Wilson/Dennis Wilson/Al Jardine)	Friends, 1968	2:30
3.	"God Only Knows" (Brian Wilson, Tony Asher)	Pet Sounds	2:49
4.	"Vegetables" (Brian Wilson, Van Dyke Parks)	Smiley Smile	2:07
5.	"How She Boogalooed It" (Mike Love, Bruce Johnston, Al Jardine, Carl Wilson)	Wild Honey	1:56
6.	"There's No Other (Like My Baby)" (Phil Spector, Leroy Bates)	Beach Boys' Party!, 1965	3:05

Side 3
No.	Title	Original album	Length
1.	"Heroes and Villains" (Brian Wilson, Van Dyke Parks)	Smiley Smile	3:36
2.	"All I Want to Do" (Dennis Wilson, Steve Kalinich)	20/20	2:02
3.	"Wild Honey"	Wild Honey	2:37
4.	"I'm Waiting for the Day"	Pet Sounds	3:03
5.	"Cotton Fields" (Huddie Ledbetter)	20/20	3:02
6.	"Then I Kissed Her" (Phil Spector, Ellie Greenwich, Jeff Barry)	Summer Days (And Summer Nights!!), 1965	2:15

Side 4
No.	Title	Original album	Length
1.	"Sloop John B" (Traditional; arranged by Brian Wilson)	Pet Sounds	2:56
2.	"Be Here in the Mornin’" (Brian Wilson, Carl Wilson, Mike Love, Dennis Wilson, Al Jardine)	Friends	2:16
3.	"Bluebirds Over the Mountain" (Ersel Hickey)	20/20	2:51
4.	"Keep an Eye on Summer" (Brian Wilson, Bob Norberg, Mike Love)	Shut Down Volume 2, 1964	2:21
5.	"Do It Again"	20/20	2:25
6.	"The Beach Boys Medley"	1981 single	4:09

== Singles ==
"The Beach Boys Medley" b/w "God Only Knows" (Capitol A-5030), October 1981 US number 12

Sunshine Dream (Capitol SVBB 12220) hit number 180 in the US.
