= Becoming the Beach Boys: The Complete Hite & Dorinda Morgan Sessions =

Compilation album by The Beach Boys
- Released: December 6, 2016
- Recorded: Early October 1961 – March 8, 1962
- Studio: World Pacific Studio (Hollywood, CA)
- Genre: Rock
- Label: Omnivore Recordings
- Producer: Hite Morgan; Dorinda Morgan; Mark Linett (remaster)

The Beach Boys chronology
Live in Chicago 1965 (2015)	Becoming the Beach Boys: The Complete Hite & Dorinda Morgan Sessions (2016)	Graduation Day 1966: Live At The University Of Michigan (2016)

Becoming the Beach Boys: The Complete Hite & Dorinda Morgan Sessions is a compilation album recorded by American rock band the Beach Boys and released by Omnivore Recordings in 2016. It was originally recorded in 1961 and early 1962. Some of the tracks were previously unreleased. The album followed the release of James Murphy's 2015 biography, also titled Becoming the Beach Boys.

== Track listing ==
=== Disc one ===
"Surfin'"

1. (Demo) (recorded in early October 1961)
2. (Takes 1–2)
3. (Take 3)
4. (Take 4)
5. (Take 5)
6. (Take 6)
7. (Take 7)
8. (Take 8)
9. (Master)
  "Luau"
10. (Demo – Take 1)
11. (Demo – Take 2)
12. (Demo – Take 3)
13. (Takes 1–2)
14. (Takes 3, 5–6)
15. (Take 7)
16. (Take 8–11)
17. (Take 12)
18. (Master)
  "Lavender"
19. (Rehearsal – Take 1)
20. (Rehearsal – Take 2)
21. (Rehearsal – Take 3)
22. (Take 1)
23. (Take 2)
24. (Take 4)
  "Surfin' Safari"
25. (Takes 3–4)
26. (Takes 5–6)
27. (Take 10)
28. (Overdub – Take 1 on Take 6)
29. (Overdub – Take 2 on Take 10)
30. (Stereo Overdub)
31. (Master)

=== Disc two ===
"Surfer Girl"

1. (Take 1)
2. (Take 2)
3. (Take 3)
4. (Take 4)
5. (Take 5)
6. (Take 6)
7. (Master)
8. (Overdub – Lead Vocals)
  "Judy"
9. (Take 1)
10. (Take 2)
11. (Overdub – Takes 1–2)
12. (Overdub – Take 4)
13. (Master)
14. (Demo – April 1962 Guitar Solo)
  "Beach Boy Stomp"
15. (Take 1)
16. (Rehearsal – Take 2)
17. (Overdub – Take 1 on Take 1)
18. (Overdub – Take 2 on Take 1)
19. (Master)
  "Barbie"
20. (Overdub – Take 1)
21. (Overdub – Takes 2–4)
22. (Overdub – Take 5)
23. (Overdub – Take 7)
24. (Single Master)
25. (Album Master)
  "What Is a Young Girl Made Of"
26. (Demo)
27. (Overdub – Take 1)
28. (Overdub – Take 3)
29. (Overdub – Takes 4–5)
30. (Overdub – Take 6)
31. (Overdub – Take 7)
32. (Master)

== Personnel ==
=== November 1961 ===
Per James Murphy.

The Beach Boys

- Brian Wilson – vocals, snare drum
- Mike Love – vocals
- Al Jardine – harmony and backing vocals, double bass
- Carl Wilson – harmony and backing vocals, acoustic rhythm guitar
- Dennis Wilson – harmony and backing vocals

Production staff

- Hite Morgan – producer, engineer
- Dorinda Morgan – producer
- Murry Wilson – producer

=== February 1962 ===
The Beach Boys

- Brian Wilson – vocals, electric bass
- Mike Love – vocals
- Carl Wilson – harmony and backing vocals, guitars
- Dennis Wilson – harmony and backing vocals, drums

Production staff

- Hite Morgan – producer, engineer
- Dorinda Morgan – producer
- Murry Wilson – producer

=== March 1962 ===
These credits are for the songs "Barbie" and "What Is A Young Girl Made Of", both of which were originally credited to Kenny and the Cadets upon their original release in 1962.

Kenny and the Cadets

- Brian Wilson – lead vocals
- Audree Wilson – harmony and backing vocals
- Al Jardine – harmony and backing vocals
- Carl Wilson – harmony and backing vocals
- Val Poliuto – harmony and backing vocals (uncertain)

Additional musicians

- unknown – instrumentation (guitars, bass, keyboards, drums)

Production staff

- Hite Morgan – producer, engineer
- Dorinda Morgan – producer

== Bibliography ==
- Murphy, James B. (2015). Becoming the Beach Boys, 1961-1963. McFarland. ISBN 978-0-7864-7365-6.
- Schinder, Scott (2007). "The Beach Boys". In Schinder, Scott; Schwartz, Andy (eds.). Icons of Rock: An Encyclopedia of the Legends Who Changed Music Forever. Westport, Connecticut: Greenwood Press. ISBN 978-0313338458.
