= Spirit of America (automobile) =

Jet cars used by Craig Breedlove for his land speed records

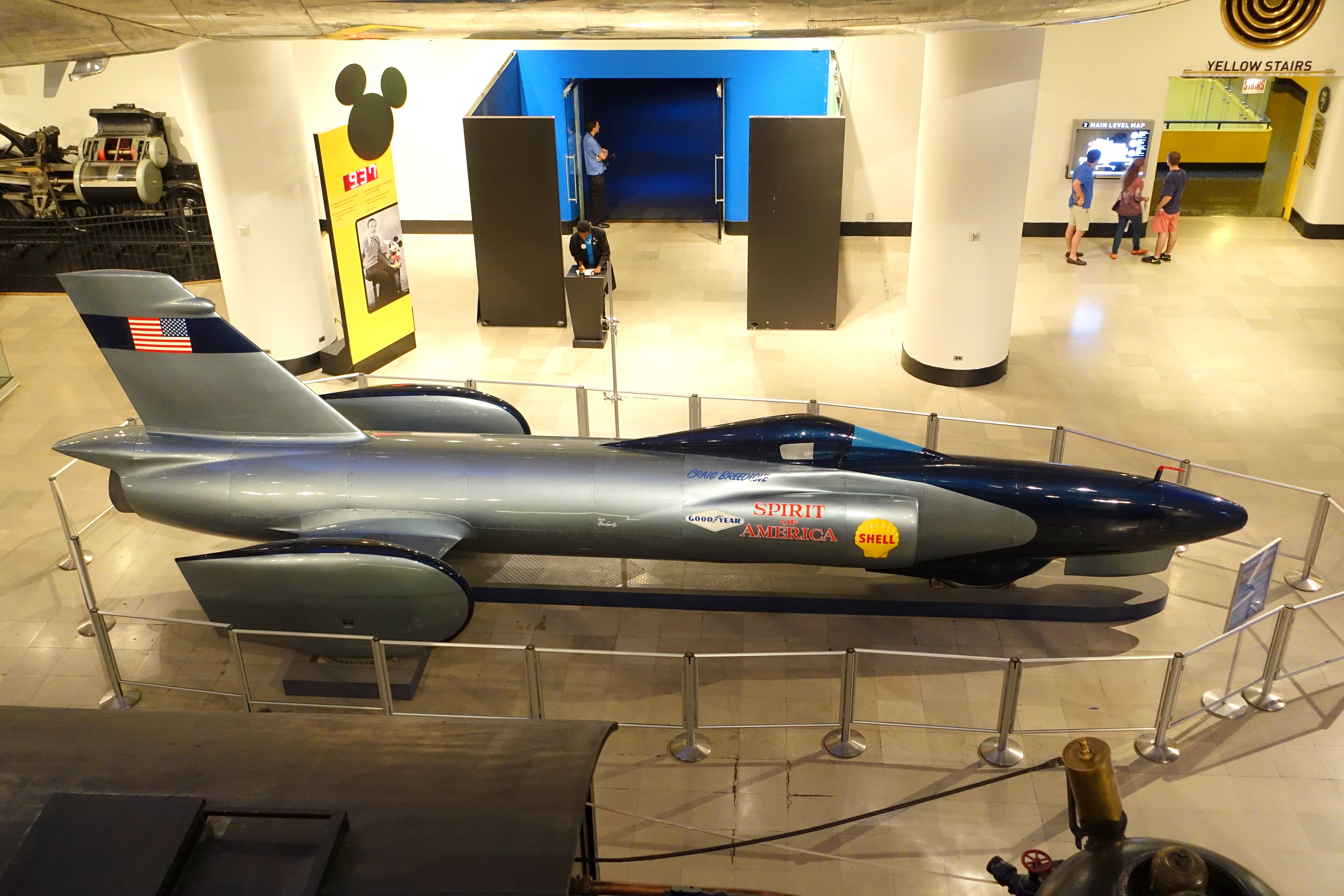
Spirit of America on exhibit at the Museum of Science and Industry in Chicago

Spirit of America is the trademarked name used by Craig Breedlove for his land speed record–setting vehicles.

== First Spirit of America ==
Spirit of America was the first of the modern record breaking jet-propelled cars, built with a narrow streamlined fuselage, three-wheel chassis, and, most significantly, turbojet engine. Like most of the other competing vehicles, the engine was ex-military. The first Spirit had a General Electric J47 engine from an F-86 and was tested at Bonneville Salt Flats in 1962, where difficult handling resulted in failure. Before trying again, a new stabilizer and steerable front wheel were added.

Breedlove set his first record on August 5, 1963, at Bonneville, the first man to set an average speed of over 400 mph (640 km/h) during a land speed record attempt. (John Cobb had already exceeded this 400 mph mark in 1947, but had not sustained it as an average over both runs.)

At the time of Spirit of America's construction, the Fédération Internationale de l'Automobile (FIA) rules for a land speed record required four wheels. Spirit's record was thus not recognised by the FIA. The Fédération Internationale de Motocyclisme (FIM) did recognise it, however, classing Spirit as a motorcycle. Although this controversy has been widely reported since as being due to the use of a jet engine, FIA rules describing a qualifying car as being "driven through its wheels", the only issue raised seriously at the time was over the number of wheels, hence the FIM acceptance.

For a period, there were thus two simultaneous land speed records, the 1947 Railton Mobil Special record remaining as the FIA four-wheel Class A record, which from July 1964 went to Campbell's Bluebird. Although Bluebird also used a "jet engine", it was a turboshaft that drove the wheels.

Both FIA & FIM records were broken in October 1964 by Tom Green and further extended by Art Arfons. Breedlove returned to Bonneville with Spirit and pushed the record over 500 mph (800 km/h), setting it at 526.277 mph (846.961 km/h) on October 15, a record that stood for almost two weeks. In setting the new record, at the end of his second run, the Spirit lost its braking parachutes, skidding for five miles (8 km), through a row of telephone poles and crashing into a brine pond at around 200 mph (320 km/h). Drenched but uninjured, Breedlove climbed out of the cockpit and declared, "And now for my next act I'm going to set myself on fire." This feat earned a place in the Guinness Book of World Records for longest skid marks. Spirit was recovered and taken to the Museum of Science and Industry in Chicago as an exhibit. Spirit of America also left the ground for the longest distance ever recorded for a ground-based vehicle, when it hit rough ground at the end of the run.. The vehicle is no longer on display at the Museum of Science and Industry in Chicago.

== Spirit of America – Sonic 1 ==
A new Spirit was built over 1964–1965 to attempt to beat Arfons, dubbed Spirit of America – Sonic I a four-wheel design with a much higher rated GE J79 engine originally from an F-4 Phantom II, the same type as that used by Arfons' Green Monster. Another tit-for-tat with Arfons ended with Breedlove setting the record at 600.601 mph (966.574 km/h) on November 15, 1965, a record that stood until 1970, broken by Gary Gabelich's The Blue Flame land speed record rocket car. The Sonic I vehicle was sold at auction in 2025 to a private individual. Its whereabouts are unknown.

== Spirit of America – Formula Shell LSRV ==
After a lengthy break from world records, Breedlove began work on a new Spirit in 1992, eventually named the Spirit of America Formula Shell LSRV. The vehicle is 44 ft 10 in long, 8 ft 4 in wide, and 5 ft 10 in high (13.67 m by 2.54 m by 1.78 m) and weighs 9,000 lb (4 t), construction is on a steel tube frame with an aluminium skin body. The engine is the same as in the second Spirit, a GE J79, but it is modified to burn unleaded gasoline and generates a maximum thrust of 22,650 lbf (100.8 kN).

The first run of the vehicle on October 28, 1996, in the Black Rock Desert, Nevada ended in a crash at around 675 mph (1,086 km/h). Returning in 1997, the vehicle badly damaged the engine on an early run. The British ThrustSSC twin-Rolls-Royce Spey turbofan-engined LSR car upped the record to 763 mph (1,228 km/h) on 15 October 1997, and became the first car to officially break the sound barrier. The re-engined Spirit could do no better than 676 mph (1088 km/h).

Breedlove sold the Spirit of America Formula Shell LSRV to Steve Fossett, holder of many sailing, ballooning, and other aviation records, and the car was undergoing rebuilding in hopes of some preliminary shakedown runs in late September 2007 at Bonneville. However, Steve Fossett disappeared in early September 2007 while scouting for alternative land speed record venues in Nevada; his body and aircraft were later located in the Sierra Nevada mountains in California.

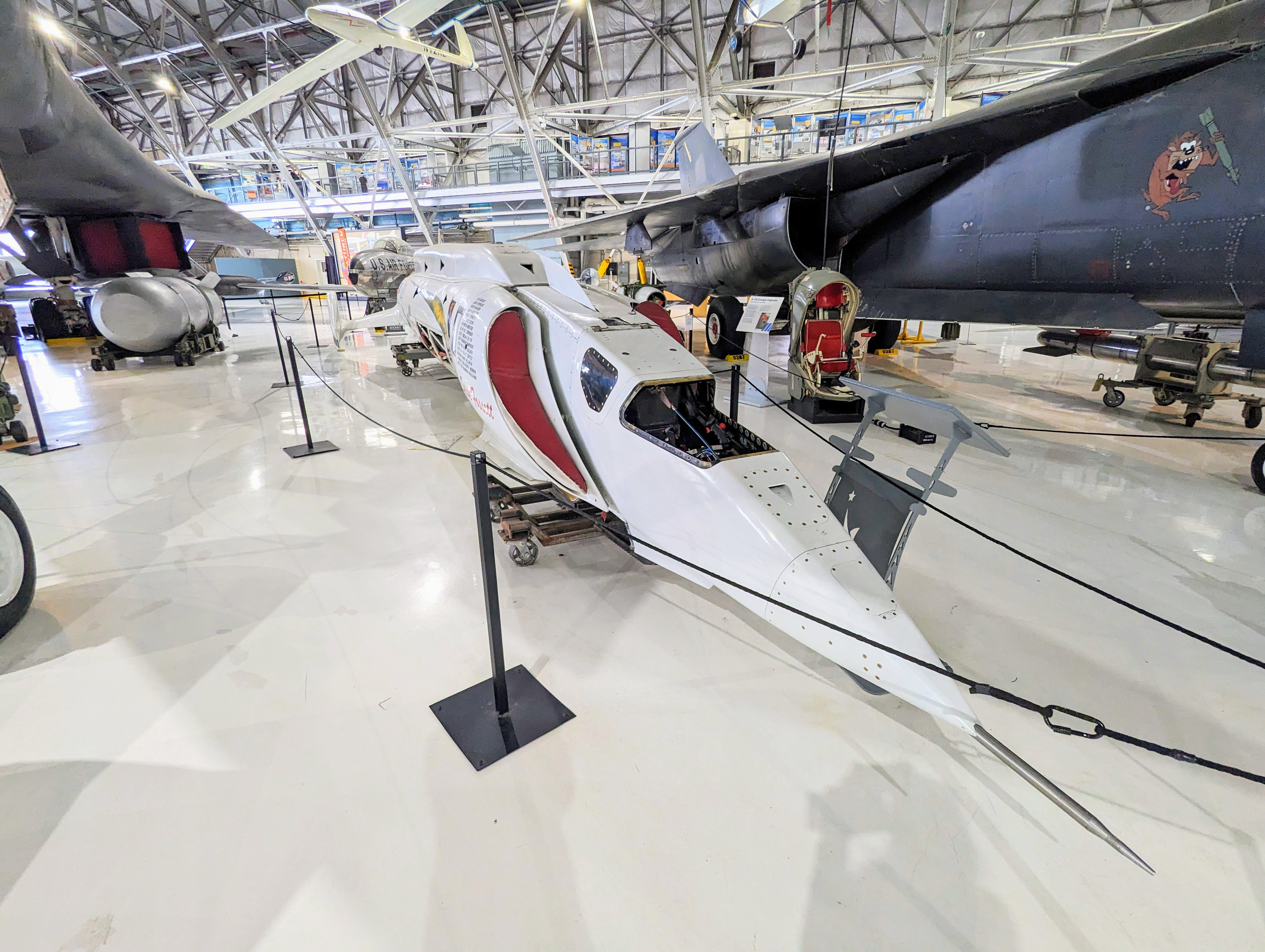
Spirit of America Sonic Arrow at Wings Over the Rockies

The Spirit of America Sonic Arrow, as it was rechristened by Fossett, was rolled out on the Black Rock Desert for a photo opportunity on October 15, 2007. The effort to run the car continued.

== Cultural references ==
The Beach Boys song "Spirit of America" is about Breedlove and the original Spirit of America.

== See also ==
- List of motorized trikes
