= Endless Summer (The Beach Boys album) =

Greatest hits album by the Beach Boys
- Released: June 24, 1974
- Recorded: April 1962 – June 1965
- Genre: Surf rock
- Length: 46:21
- Label: Capitol
- Producers: Brian Wilson, Nick Venet

The Beach Boys chronology
The Beach Boys in Concert (1973)	Endless Summer (1974)	Spirit of America (1975)

Professional ratings
Review scores
Source	Rating
AllMusic	5/5 stars
Encyclopedia of Popular Music	5/5 stars
MusicHound	4/5
Rolling Stone	5/5 stars

Endless Summer is a compilation album by the American rock band the Beach Boys, released on June 24, 1974. A collection of hits from the band's 1962–65 period, Endless Summer was compiled by their old label, Capitol Records, following the success of the film American Graffiti, in which two of their songs were featured. It revitalized the band's popularity after years of lukewarm sales, but also inspired nostalgia for the Beach Boys' early surfing and hot rod-themed music, repositioning the group as an oldies act.

Less than four months after its release, the album reached number 1 in the United States and Canada. It was the group's second chart-topping album in the US and returned them to a level of commercial success they had not experienced since the mid-1960s. The compilation has spent 156 weeks on the Billboard albums chart and has been certified 3× platinum by the RIAA for shipping over three million copies in the United States. Capitol released a second themed compilation in 1975 titled Spirit of America, which also sold well, while a third volume, Sunshine Dream, appeared in 1982.

The album was included in Robert Christgau's "Basic Record Library" of 1950s and 1960s recordings, published in Christgau's Record Guide: Rock Albums of the Seventies (1981). It was voted number 972 in the third edition of Colin Larkin's All Time Top 1000 Albums (2000).

== Background ==
In 1992, Mike Love noted, "They were going to do a Best Of The Beach Boys Volume Three [sic] in 19- , whatever the hell it was, and I came in there and went, "Wait a second, call it Endless Summer, instead of being Volume Three which sounded nauseating to me. Endless Summer has a whole other vibe to it and sold several million copies just with the switch of the title. But then I'm a title guy anyway."

== Artwork ==
Initial pressings of this album contained a poster depicting an airplane flying a Beach Boys banner. While the album is limited entirely to the band's 1960s material, the cover artwork reflected the Beach Boys' 1970s appearance. The artwork illustrator was Keith McConnell (who also did the artwork for their follow-ups, Spirit of America and Sunshine Dream). With vegetation in the foreground, it also seems to evoke images of the band's late 1960s Smiley Smile album, although none of the songs on the original pressing are from Smiley Smile. ("Good Vibrations" was added to the 1987 CD release of the album as a bonus track.)

== Releases ==
Although originally released as a double album (two LPs in a gatefold sleeve) in the US, the album was released in the UK on a single LP with 10 songs on each side.

The records on the vinyl release were pressed with Sides 1 & 4 on one disc and Sides 2 & 3 on the other to accommodate record changers, which were widely popular in the 1970s. The cassette version differs slightly as to the sequence of tracks. Side 1 features all tracks from Sides 1 & 2 in the same order plus "I Get Around" from Side 3. Side 2 includes the remaining tracks from Sides 3 & 4 in the same order with the exception of "Girls on the Beach" and "Wendy" which were 'swapped'.

The song "Help Me, Ronda," the version from the album The Beach Boys Today!, which was the one included in this album, was retitled "Help Me, Rhonda," like the hit single version. It was featured as one of two Beach Boys tracks in a promotional-only various artists compilation album issued by Capitol records entitled The Greatest Music Ever Sold (Capitol SPRO-8511/8512), that was distributed to record stores during the 1976 Holiday season as part of Capitol's "Greatest Music Ever Sold" campaign, which promoted 15 "Best Of" albums released by the record label. The song was once again retitled "Help Me, Rhonda," for this compilation album. "Dance, Dance, Dance" from Spirit of America was the other Beach Boys song to be included.

The audiophile reissue label DCC Compact Classics released its own Endless Summer CD in 1995. It was mastered by Steve Hoffman and contains the hit single versions of "Help Me, Rhonda" and "Be True to Your School" rather than the alternate album versions which appeared on the original release. It also retains the "Good Vibrations" bonus track from the 1987 Capitol CD, and swaps the positions of "Surfin' Safari" and "Surfin' U.S.A.".

== Track listing ==
All songs written by Brian Wilson and Mike Love, except where noted.

Side 1
No.	Title	Original album	Length
1.	"Surfin' Safari"	Surfin' Safari, 1962	2:05
2.	"Surfer Girl" (Brian Wilson)	Surfer Girl, 1963	2:26
3.	"Catch a Wave"	Surfer Girl	2:07
4.	"The Warmth of the Sun"	Shut Down Volume 2, 1964	2:51
5.	"Surfin' U.S.A." (B. Wilson/Chuck Berry)	Surfin' U.S.A., 1963	2:27
Total length:			11:56

Side 2
No.	Title	Original album	Length
1.	"Be True to Your School"	Little Deuce Coupe, 1963	2:07
2.	"Little Deuce Coupe" (B. Wilson/Roger Christian)	Surfer Girl	1:38
3.	"In My Room" (B. Wilson/Gary Usher)	Surfer Girl	2:11
4.	"Shut Down" (B. Wilson/Christian)	Surfin' U.S.A.	1:49
5.	"Fun, Fun, Fun"	Shut Down Volume 2	2:16
Total length:			10:01

Side 3
No.	Title	Original album	Length
1.	"I Get Around"	All Summer Long, 1964	2:12
2.	"Girls on the Beach" (B. Wilson)	All Summer Long	2:24
3.	"Wendy"	All Summer Long	2:16
4.	"Let Him Run Wild"	Summer Days (And Summer Nights!!), 1965	2:20
5.	"Don't Worry Baby" (B. Wilson/Christian)	Shut Down Volume 2	2:47
Total length:			11:59

Side 4
No.	Title	Original album	Length
1.	"California Girls"	Summer Days (And Summer Nights!!)	2:38
2.	"Girl Don't Tell Me" (B. Wilson)	Summer Days (And Summer Nights!!)	2:19
3.	"Help Me, Rhonda"	The Beach Boys Today!, 1965	3:08
4.	"You're So Good to Me"	Summer Days (And Summer Nights!!)	2:14
5.	"All Summer Long"	All Summer Long	2:06
Total length:			12:25

1987 CD bonus track
No.	Title	Original album	Length
21.	"Good Vibrations"	Smiley Smile, 1967	3:35

== Charts ==
=== Weekly charts ===
Chart (1974)	Peak position
US Billboard 200	1

=== Year-end charts ===
Chart (1975)	Position
US Billboard 200	49

== Certifications ==
Region	Certification	Certified units/sales
United Kingdom (BPI)	Gold	100,000^{‡}
United States (RIAA)	3× Platinum	3,000,000^{^}
^{^} Shipments figures based on certification alone.^{‡} Sales+streaming figures based on certification alone.
