= Break Away (The Beach Boys song) =

Single by the Beach Boys
- B-side: "Celebrate the News"
- Released: June 16, 1969
- Recorded: March 31 – April 23, 1969
- Length: 2:57
- Label: Capitol
- Songwriters: Brian Wilson, Reggie Dunbar
- Producers: Brian Wilson, Murry Wilson

The Beach Boys singles chronology
"I Can Hear Music" (1969)	"Break Away" (1969)	"Add Some Music to Your Day" (1970)

Licensed audio
- "Break Away" on YouTube

"Break Away" is a song by the American rock band the Beach Boys that was recorded during the early sessions for their album Sunflower and issued as a non-album single on June 16, 1969. It was written by Brian Wilson and Murry Wilson, although Murry was credited as lyricist under the pseudonym "Reggie Dunbar". Dennis Wilson's "Celebrate the News" was chosen as the B-side. The single peaked at No. 63 in the US and No. 6 in the UK.

Record World called it "an extremely pretty and summery song."

== Background ==
According to Brian, Murry came up with the idea for the song from watching The Joey Bishop Show on television while it proclaimed, "We're gonna break away for a minute and we'll be right back!". Brian, at his piano, then composed the song with Murry as they "plunked and plunked and plunked" and "finally got a song going." At another time, Brian said that the Monkees inspired him to write this song. The Monkees had appeared on the aforementioned television program on April 29, 1969, but "Break Away" was recorded prior to that date.

Asked why Murry had used a pseudonym, Brian responded that his father "didn't want anyone to know that he wrote it with me." On another occasion, Brian gave a different answer to the same journalist, saying "I don't know. He was nutty. He was crazy, that was his fictitious name."

Brian Wilson spoke positively of the song in a later interview, commenting, "That's a beautiful song. I think it might be one of my most underrated songs."

== Charts ==
Chart (1969)	Peak position
Ireland (IRMA)	10
Netherlands (Single Top 100)	10
New Zealand (Listener Chart)	20
UK Singles (The Official Charts Company)	6
US Billboard Hot 100	63
West Germany (GfK)	29
