= Shut Down (The Beach Boys song) =

1963 song

Single by the Beach Boys

from the album Surfin' U.S.A. and Little Deuce Coupe
- A-side: "Surfin' U.S.A."
- Released: March 4, 1963
- Recorded: January 5, 1963
- Studio: Western, Hollywood
- Genre: Hot rod rock; car song
- Length: 1:54
- Label: Capitol
- Songwriters: Brian Wilson; Roger Christian
- Producer: Nik Venet

The Beach Boys singles chronology
"Ten Little Indians" (1962)	"Shut Down" (1963)	"Surfer Girl" (1963)

Licensed audio
- "Shut Down" on YouTube

"Shut Down" is a song written by Brian Wilson and Roger Christian for the American rock band the Beach Boys. The primary melody is a twelve-bar blues. On March 4, 1963, it was released as the B-side of the single "Surfin' U.S.A.", three weeks ahead of the album of the same name on which both tracks appeared. Capitol Records released it again later that year on the album Little Deuce Coupe. The single peaked at No. 23 on the "Billboard" Hot 100 chart (No. 7 on the United Press International chart published in newspapers), and No. 34 in the UK.

== History ==
The song details a drag race between a Super-Stock 413 cu. in.-powered 1962 Dodge Dart and a fuel-injected 1963 Chevrolet Corvette Sting Ray and is derived from a longer poem by Christian. The song is sung from the perspective of the driver of the Sting Ray who brags that he will "shut down" the 413. (In hot rod racing slang, to "shut down" someone means to beat that person in a race.) While the implication is that the Sting Ray will win the race, the song ends before the end of the race with the 413 still in the lead, with the Sting Ray closing the gap. Although the race is often interpreted as having an inconclusive outcome, the lyrics in the outro refrain do state, "Shut it off, shut it off/Buddy now I shut you down", clearly indicating that the narrator, in his Corvette Sting Ray, has in fact won the race, as he tells the Dodge 413's driver to "shut off" the car's engine and accept the fact that he has just been "shut down".

Cash Box described it as "powerful" and having "top rock-a-teen sounds."

== Personnel ==
- Mike Love – lead vocal, saxophone
- David Marks – rhythm guitar, lead guitar during fade-out
- Brian Wilson – harmony and backing vocals, bass guitar
- Carl Wilson – harmony and backing vocals, lead guitar
- Dennis Wilson – harmony and backing vocals, drums

== Chart performance ==
Chart (1963)	Peak position
UK Singles (The Official Charts Company)	34
US Billboard Hot 100	23

== Variations ==
A live version was released on Hawthorne, CA and the song is also part of a live medley on Endless Harmony. A 2003 stereo remix of the song appeared on the Sounds of Summer: The Very Best of The Beach Boys compilation. It also plays in the Super Mario Bros. Super Show episode "The Great BMX Race", and is the basis for "Go, Putt-Putt" in Putt-Putt Enters the Race.

== Cover versions ==
- The song was recorded and released by Jan & Dean on their 1982 album, One Summer Night/Live.
