= The Warmth of the Sun (album) =

Greatest hits album by The Beach Boys
- Released: May 22, 2007
- Recorded: 1962–1986
- Genre: Rock
- Length: 78:41
- Label: Capitol
- Producers: Brian Wilson, Murry Wilson, Nick Venet, The Beach Boys, Carl Wilson, Al Jardine, Bruce Johnston and Terry Melcher

The Beach Boys chronology
| Good Vibrations: 40th Anniversary Edition (2006) | The Warmth of the Sun (2007) | The Original US Singles Collection The Capitol Years 1962–1965 (2008) |

Professional ratings
Review scores
| Source | Rating |
|---|---|
| Allmusic | 4/5 stars |
| The Encyclopedia of Popular Music | 4/5 stars |
| Music Box | 4/5 stars |
| Pitchfork Media | (8.6/10) |

The Warmth of the Sun is a 2007 compilation of music by The Beach Boys released through Capitol Records. A companion to 2003's Sounds of Summer: The Very Best of The Beach Boys, The Warmth of the Sun is composed of fan favorites and hits that were left off its predecessor. Several songs were remixed in stereo for the first time. These are "All Summer Long", "You're So Good to Me", "Then I Kissed Her", "Please Let Me Wonder", and "Let Him Run Wild". The song "Wendy" appears as a new stereo remix with its middle eight cough edited out. This album also features an alternate mix of "Break Away" and the single versions of "Why Do Fools Fall In Love" and "Cool, Cool Water".

The Warmth of the Sun debuted at number 40 on the Billboard 200, selling 14,000 copies in its first week.

== Track listing ==
| No. | Title | Writer(s) | Original release | Length |
|---|---|---|---|---|
| 1. | "All Summer Long" (New Stereo Mix) | Brian Wilson; Mike Love | All Summer Long, 1964 | 2:09 |
| 2. | "Catch a Wave" | B. Wilson; Love | Surfer Girl, 1963 | 2:08 |
| 3. | "Hawaii" | B. Wilson; Love | Surfer Girl, 1963 | 2:00 |
| 4. | "Little Honda" | B. Wilson; Love | All Summer Long, 1964 | 1:52 |
| 5. | "409" | B. Wilson; Gary Usher; Love | Surfin' Safari, 1962 | 2:00 |
| 6. | "It's O.K." | B. Wilson; Love | 15 Big Ones, 1976 | 2:12 |
| 7. | "You're So Good to Me" (New Stereo Mix) | B. Wilson; Love | Summer Days (And Summer Nights!!), 1965 | 2:15 |
| 8. | "Then I Kissed Her" (New Stereo Mix) | Phil Spector; Ellie Greenwich; Jeff Barry | Summer Days (And Summer Nights!!), 1965 | 2:16 |
| 9. | "Kiss Me, Baby" (2000 Stereo Mix) | B. Wilson; Love | The Beach Boys Today!, 1965 | 2:43 |
| 10. | "Please Let Me Wonder" (New Stereo Mix) | B. Wilson; Love | The Beach Boys Today!, 1965 | 2:50 |
| 11. | "Let Him Run Wild" (New Stereo Mix) | B. Wilson; Love | Summer Days (And Summer Nights!!), 1965 | 2:20 |
| 12. | "The Little Girl I Once Knew" (Mono) | B. Wilson | non-album single, 1965 | 2:02 |
| 13. | "Wendy" (New Stereo Mix) | B. Wilson; Love | All Summer Long, 1964 | 2:16 |
| 14. | "Disney Girls (1957)" | Bruce Johnston | Surf's Up, 1971 | 4:07 |
| 15. | "Forever" | Dennis Wilson; Gregg Jakobson | Sunflower, 1970 | 2:41 |
| 16. | "Friends" | B. Wilson; D. Wilson; Carl Wilson; Al Jardine | Friends, 1968 | 2:32 |
| 17. | "Break Away" (Alternate Stereo Mix) | B. Wilson; Reggie Dunbar | non-album single, 1969 | 3:05 |
| 18. | "Why Do Fools Fall in Love" (Mono Single Version) | Morris Levy; Frankie Lymon | Shut Down Volume 2, 1964 | 2:07 |
| 19. | "Surf's Up" | B. Wilson; Van Dyke Parks | Surf's Up, 1971 | 4:12 |
| 20. | "Feel Flows" | C. Wilson; Jack Rieley | Surf's Up, 1971 | 4:46 |
| 21. | "All This Is That" | C. Wilson; Love; Jardine | Carl and the Passions - "So Tough", 1972 | 3:57 |
| 22. | "'Til I Die" | B. Wilson | Surf's Up, 1971 | 2:40 |
| 23. | "Sail On, Sailor" | B. Wilson; Parks; Rieley; Raymond Kennedy; Tandyn Almer | Holland, 1973 | 3:16 |
| 24. | "Cool, Cool Water" (Single Version) | B. Wilson; Love | Sunflower, 1970 | 3:24 |
| 25. | "Don't Go Near the Water" | Love; Jardine | Surf's Up, 1971 | 2:39 |
| 26. | "California Saga (On My Way to Sunny Californ-i-a)" (Single Version) | Jardine | Holland, 1973 | 3:22 |
| 27. | "California Dreamin'" | John Phillips; Michelle Phillips | Made in U.S.A., 1986 | 3:24 |
| 28. | "The Warmth of the Sun" (Mono) | B. Wilson; Love | Shut Down Volume 2, 1964 | 2:50 |
| Total length: | | | | 78:41 |
