= The Beach Boys On Tour: 1968 =

Live album by The Beach Boys
- Released: December 14, 2018
- Recorded: June – December 1968
- Venue: Various, United States and England
- Genre: Rock
- Label: Capitol
- Producer: Alan Boyd; Mark Linett

The Beach Boys chronology
I Can Hear Music: The 20/20 Sessions (2018)	The Beach Boys On Tour: 1968 (2018)	1969: I'm Going Your Way (2019)

The Beach Boys On Tour: 1968 is a live album recorded by the Beach Boys, released on December 14, 2018 by Capitol Records. It compiles eight of their full concert performances from 1968.

== Background ==
These performances were part of the band's 1968 tour in the U.S. on the back of their recent studio album Friends as well as for the upcoming 20/20 album during the later U.K. dates. The compilation also features the entirety of the original Live in London release from 1970.

== Track listing ==
All tracks are written by Brian Wilson and Mike Love, except where noted.

Live in Chicago, IL
No.	Title	Length
1.	"Darlin' (incomplete)"	1:12
2.	"Help Me, Rhonda"	2:12
3.	"California Girls"	2:29
4.	"Sloop John B." (Traditional, arr. by B. Wilson)	2:38
5.	"Surfer Girl"	3:06
6.	"Friends"	2:39
7.	"Little Bird" (Dennis Wilson, Stephen Kalinich)	2:21
8.	"Wouldn't It Be Nice" (B. Wilson, Love, Tony Asher)	2:14
9.	"Medley: Surfin' Safari/Fun, Fun, Fun/Shut Down/Little Deuce Coupe/Surfin' U.S.A." (B. Wilson, Love, Roger Christian, Chuck Berry)	3:25
10.	"Do It Again"	3:04
11.	"Wake the World"	2:08
12.	"God Only Knows" (B. Wilson, Asher)	2:46
13.	"Their Hearts Were Full of Spring" (Bobby Troup)	2:44
14.	"Good Vibrations"	4:18
15.	"Barbara Ann" (Fred Fassert)	3:02
16.	"Band Instrumental"	2:46

Live in Fargo, ND
No.	Title	Length
17.	"Help Me, Rhonda"	2:17
18.	"California Girls"	2:24
19.	"Sloop John B." (traditional, arranged by B. Wilson)	2:39
20.	"Surfer Girl"	2:33
21.	"Friends"	2:45
22.	"Little Bird" (D. Wilson, Kalinich)	1:59
23.	"Wouldn't It Be Nice" (B. Wilson, Love, Asher)	1:59
24.	"Medley: Surfin' Safari/Fun, Fun, Fun/Shut Down/Little Deuce Coupe/Surfin' U.S.A." (B. Wilson, Love, Christian, Berry)	3:14
25.	"Do It Again"	3:10
26.	"Wake the World"	2:33
27.	"Band Instrumental"	4:11
28.	"Their Hearts Were Full of Spring" (Troup)	2:10
29.	"God Only Knows" (B. Wilson, Asher)	2:48
30.	"Good Vibrations"	4:02
31.	"Barbara Ann" (Fassert)	3:00
32.	"Johnny B. Goode" (Berry)	2:44

Live in Waterloo, IA
No.	Title	Length
33.	"Darlin' (incomplete)"	2:15
34.	"Help Me, Rhonda"	2:10
35.	"California Girls"	2:28
36.	"Sloop John B." (traditional, arranged by B. Wilson)	2:39
37.	"Surfer Girl"	2:57
38.	"Friends"	2:35
39.	"Little Bird" (D. Wilson, Kalinich)	1:58
40.	"Wouldn't It Be Nice" (B. Wilson, Love, Asher)	2:08
41.	"Medley: Surfin' Safari/Fun, Fun, Fun/Shut Down/Little Deuce Coupe/Surfin' U.S.A." (B. Wilson, Love, Christian, Berry)	3:22
42.	"Do It Again"	2:43
43.	"Wake the World"	2:20
44.	"God Only Knows" (B. Wilson, Asher)	2:53
45.	"Band Instrumental"	3:41
46.	"Good Vibrations"	3:56
47.	"Barbara Ann" (Fassert)	2:22
48.	"Johnny B. Goode" (Berry)	3:16

Live in Lincoln, NE
No.	Title	Length
49.	"Darlin' (incomplete)"	2:14
50.	"Help Me, Rhonda"	2:11
51.	"California Girls"	2:28
52.	"Sloop John B." (traditional, arranged by B. Wilson)	2:57
53.	"Surfer Girl"	3:04
54.	"Friends"	2:54
55.	"Little Bird" (D. Wilson, Kalinich)	1:55
56.	"Wouldn't It Be Nice" (B. Wilson, Love, Asher)	1:56
57.	"Medley: Surfin' Safari/Fun, Fun, Fun/Shut Down/Little Deuce Coupe/Surfin' U.S.A." (B. Wilson, Love, Christian, Berry)	3:11
58.	"Do It Again"	2:32
59.	"Wake the World"	2:10
60.	"God Only Knows" (B. Wilson, Asher)	2:48
61.	"Their Hearts Were Full of Spring" (Troup)	2:46
62.	"Good Vibrations"	4:14
63.	"Barbara Ann" (Fassert)	2:16
64.	"Johnny B. Goode" (Berry)	3:23

Live in Phoenix, AZ
No.	Title	Length
65.	"California Girls"	2:43
66.	"Sloop John B."	2:47
67.	"Surfer Girl"	2:46
68.	"Friends"	2:28
69.	"Little Bird" (D. Wilson, Kalinich)	1:52
70.	"Medley: Surfin' Safari/Fun, Fun, Fun/Shut Down/Little Deuce Coupe/Surfin' U.S.A." (B. Wilson, Love, Christian, Berry)	3:35
71.	"Wouldn't It Be Nice" (B. Wilson, Love, Asher)	2:47
72.	"Do It Again"	3:09
73.	"Wake the World"	2:28
74.	"God Only Knows" (B. Wilson, Asher)	2:39
75.	"Good Vibrations"	4:03
76.	"I Get Around"	2:18
77.	"Barbara Ann" (Fassert)	2:22
78.	"Johnny B. Goode" (Berry)	3:18

Live at the London Palladium – first show
No.	Title	Length
79.	"Wouldn't It Be Nice" (B. Wilson, Love, Asher)	2:07
80.	"Darlin'"	2:23
81.	"Sloop John B." (traditional, arranged by B. Wilson)	2:31
82.	"California Girls"	2:29
83.	"Do It Again"	3:03
84.	"Wake the World"	2:23
85.	"Bluebirds Over the Mountain" (Ersel Hickey)	3:40
86.	"God Only Knows" (B. Wilson, Asher)	3:44
87.	"Good Vibrations"	4:12
88.	"Barbara Ann" (Fassert)	2:06
89.	"All I Want to Do" (D. Wilson, Kalinich)	2:12

Live at the London Palladium – second show
No.	Title	Length
90.	"Wouldn't It Be Nice" (B. Wilson, Love, Asher)	2:03
91.	"Darlin'"	2:21
92.	"Sloop John B." (traditional, arranged by B. Wilson)	2:42
93.	"California Girls"	2:30
94.	"Do It Again"	3:00
95.	"Wake the World"	2:42
96.	"Bluebirds Over the Mountain" (Hickey)	3:27
97.	"God Only Knows" (B. Wilson, Asher)	2:55
98.	"Good Vibrations"	4:39
99.	"Barbara Ann" (Fassert)	2:21
100.	"All I Want to Do" (D. Wilson, Kalinich)	3:00

Live at Finsbury Park Astoria, London
No.	Title	Length
101.	"God Only Knows (soundcheck)" (B. Wilson, Asher)	3:53
102.	"Good Vibrations (soundcheck)"	4:10
103.	"Darlin'"	2:38
104.	"Wouldn't It Be Nice" (B. Wilson, Love, Asher)	1:51
105.	"Sloop John B." (traditional, arranged by B. Wilson)	2:33
106.	"California Girls"	2:52
107.	"Do It Again"	3:06
108.	"Wake the World"	2:20
109.	"Aren't You Glad"	3:20
110.	"Bluebirds Over the Mountain" (Hickey)	3:07
111.	"Their Hearts Were Full of Spring" (Troup)	3:14
112.	"Good Vibrations"	3:43
113.	"God Only Knows" (B. Wilson, Asher)	3:14
114.	"Barbara Ann" (Fassert)	3:28

== Personnel ==
Partial credits sourced from Craig Slowinski.

- Carl Wilson – vocals, lead guitar
- Dennis Wilson – vocals, drums
- Mike Love – vocals, electro-Theremin on "Good Vibrations"
- Al Jardine – vocals, rhythm guitar
- Bruce Johnston – bass guitar, vocals

Additional personnel

- Dennis Dragon – percussion (April – August 1968)
- unknown (possibly John Guerin) – percussion, drums on "Friends" and "Little Bird" (July 1968)
- Daryl Dragon – piano, organ, bass on "Bluebirds Over the Mountain"
- Ed Carter – bass, tambourine, lead guitar on "Bluebirds Over the Mountain" (August–December 1968)
- Mike Kowalski – percussion (August–December 1968)
- Unknown horns and possible cello
