= The Beach Boys' 1968 US tour with Maharishi Mahesh Yogi =

1968 concert tour by the Beach Boys

- Tour by the Beach Boys, Maharishi Mahesh Yogi
- Poster to the first concert in Washington, D.C.
- Location: United States
- Associated album: Friends
- Start date: May 3, 1968
- End date: May 6, 1968 (originally scheduled to end on May 21)
- Legs: 1
- No. of shows: 5 (24 further shows canceled)

In May 1968, the American rock band the Beach Boys undertook a concert tour of the United States with Maharishi Mahesh Yogi, their Indian meditation guru. The tour preceded the release of the Beach Boys' Friends album, which similarly reflected the influence of the Maharishi's Transcendental Meditation (TM) technique on the band, and was a commercial failure. The program comprised a set of songs by the Beach Boys, followed by a lecture from the Maharishi on the benefits of meditation. Twenty-nine concerts were originally scheduled, many of them in college venues, but the venture was abandoned after three days of low ticket sales and hostile audience reaction to the Maharishi's segment. The guru's commitment to making a documentary film about himself, for Four Star Television, was cited as a further impediment.

The tour was initiated by Mike Love, who became devoted to TM in December 1967 and joined the Beatles for two weeks at the Maharishi's training course in India in early 1968. Given the Maharishi's popularity when the bookings were made, the Beach Boys hoped that the tour would alleviate the financial shortfall caused by an abortive tour they made in the US South, in April. The Maharishi's spiritual pronouncements held little appeal for the group's fan base, however. Canceling their tour dates with the Maharishi cost the Beach Boys $250,000, and a commentator later described the pairing as "one of the most bizarre entertainments of the era".

== Background ==
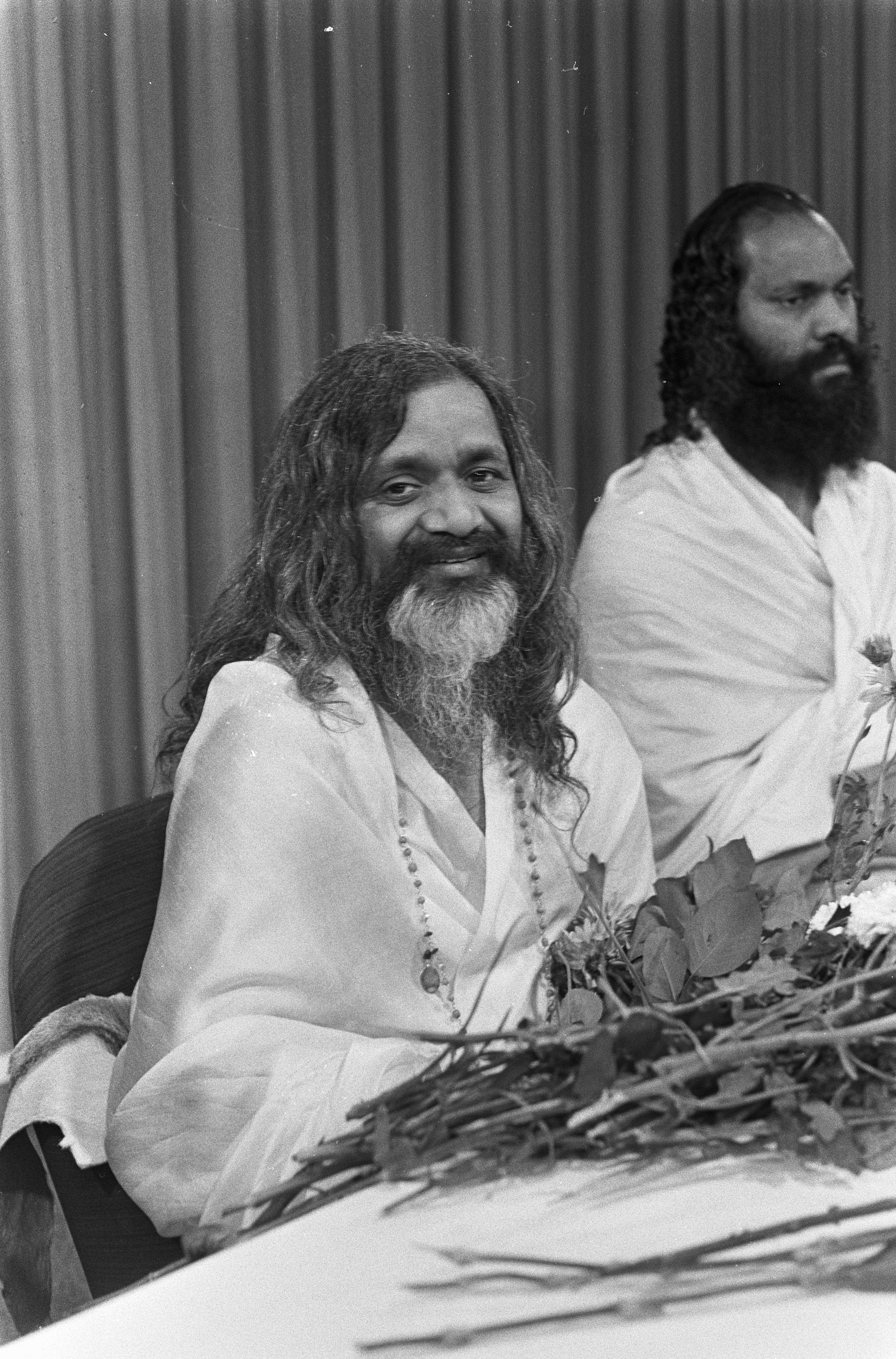
The Marahishi at a press conference, September 1967

Along with his Beach Boys bandmates Dennis Wilson and Al Jardine, Mike Love was one of the many rock musicians who discovered the teachings of Maharishi Mahesh Yogi following the Beatles' public endorsement of his TM technique in August 1967. Jardine recalled that, while his band were in England, he was visited at his London suite by John Lennon and George Harrison. "They were proselytizing on behalf of TM. They suggested that we get involved with the program and that they would see us later in Paris because they were going to be with Maharishi at this huge concert we were doing ..."

In December that year, Love and his bandmates attended a lecture by the Maharishi in Paris and were moved by the simplicity and effectiveness of the meditation process as a means to obtaining inner peace. In January 1968, the Beach Boys attended the Maharishi's public appearances in New York and Cambridge, Massachusetts, after which he invited Love to join the Beatles at his training seminar in Rishikesh in northern India. During their stay at the Plaza Hotel in New York, the guru and the band attended a photoshoot with photographer Linda Eastman (later the first wife of Paul McCartney).

Although the other Beach Boys were similarly taken with meditation, they voted against Love's idea that the group should finance a documentary film about the Maharishi. The latter was a project that the guru had planned with Charles Lutes, the president of his organisation, the Spiritual Regeneration Movement. From February 28 until March 15, Love studied Transcendental Meditation at the Maharishi's ashram in Rishikesh, along with the Beatles.

== Planning and surrounding pressures ==
The group with the Maharishi at the Plaza Hotel in New York City, January 1968. From left: Al Jardine, Dennis Wilson, Mike Love, the Maharishi, Carl Wilson, and Brian Wilson.

During their stay in Rishikesh, Love and Lutes planned a US concert tour that would feature the Beach Boys and the Maharishi as co-headliners. The tour would allow the Maharishi to propagate his message to an audience of young pop fans and, according to author Peter Ames Carlin, it would improve the Beach Boys' standing at a time when they and their music had fallen out of step with contemporary trends. On a stopover in London before returning to Los Angeles, Love enthused to Melody Maker: "We're going to use a lighting system to project the Maharishi on screens above the stage so everybody will be able to see him. We'll perform with a band for 45 minutes followed by an intermission with a TV documentary. Then he'll come out and lecture the audience with time for questions and answers." (Note: During the same visit to London, Love discussed the possibility of a "Festival of Peace" world tour by the Beach Boys and the Maharishi, an idea he said that he and the Beatles had conceived in Rishikesh.) In early April, the tour was announced with a starting date of May 3 and a duration of seventeen days.

Once back in Los Angeles, Love rejoined the Beach Boys and helped them complete their new album, Friends, which included songs that reflected the group's enthusiasm for meditation. From April 5, the band attempted a series of self-financed concerts in the US South, known as "the Million Dollar Tour". For these dates, their support acts were Buffalo Springfield and Strawberry Alarm Clock. The concerts were poorly attended and a commercial failure, due partly to the militant mood following the April 4th assassination of Martin Luther King Jr., and the tour was abandoned on April 12. After this setback, according to Nick Grillo, the Beach Boys' business manager, the band hoped that their upcoming tour with the Maharishi would alleviate the financial shortfall. Love later wrote that the intention was for the Beach Boys to cover their expenses while the remainder of the proceeds went to the Maharishi.

Due to the Beatles' popularity and influence, the Maharishi's status had been elevated to that of an international celebrity. Although his apolitical stance concerned some commentators in the US, he was accepted by the counterculture as an important voice in the collective search for change and self-awareness. However, on April 12, Harrison and Lennon, the two Beatles most committed to TM, abruptly left the ashram in Rishikesh, signaling the band's split with the Maharishi. Some witnesses said that Lennon and Harrison's departure was in reaction to the Maharishi's alleged sexual impropriety towards some of his female students; others cited the arrival of Lutes, accompanied by a film crew to film the planned documentary, after he had signed a contract with Four Star Television on the understanding that the Beatles would appear in the production. (Note: Lutes forged ahead with his plan for the documentary to counter the Beatles' initial interest in producing the film themselves, under the aegis of their company Apple Films. The Maharishi had offered the project to Apple, despite his existing agreement with Lutes.) The Beatles' disenchantment with the Maharishi and the Spiritual Regeneration Movement had a detrimental effect on the guru's standing among music fans.

== History ==
The concerts were advertised as "The Most Exciting Event of the Decade!" and promoted by Budd Filippo Attractions. The program comprised a set of songs by the Beach Boys followed by the Maharishi's lecture on the benefits of meditation. The band was augmented by eleven backing musicians. The Maharishi failed to show up for the pre-tour press conference in New York on May 2. The press were told that he had caught pneumonia, but Grillo, speaking later in a BBC Radio 1 interview, said that in fact the Maharishi was preoccupied with his documentary film. The following day, the guru arrived late at the Beach Boys' press conference at Georgetown University in Washington, D.C. An unimpressed John Sherwood of the Washington Evening Star reported: "The Maharishi was coming to Mohammed on the sacred banks of the Potomac, but in search of what? He was coming with ... he was coming with ... The Beach Boys, a fading rock music group in white suits bent on a head-shrinking concert tour ... from here to California."

The tour opened on May 3 at the 8000-seat Washington Coliseum, playing to 1500 fans. William Rice, in his review for The Washington Post, described the band's 40-minute performance as "dreadful", citing the poor sound system, the under-rehearsed backing musicians, and the Beach Boys' out-of-tune singing. Following an intermission, the Maharishi addressed the audience for 30 minutes, while seated on a green sofa in the center of the stage. His lecture was also hindered by the poor acoustics, and drew jeers and heckling from many of the fans. By this point, the Beach Boys had gone on to the Baltimore Civic Center, in preparation for the next stop on the itinerary.

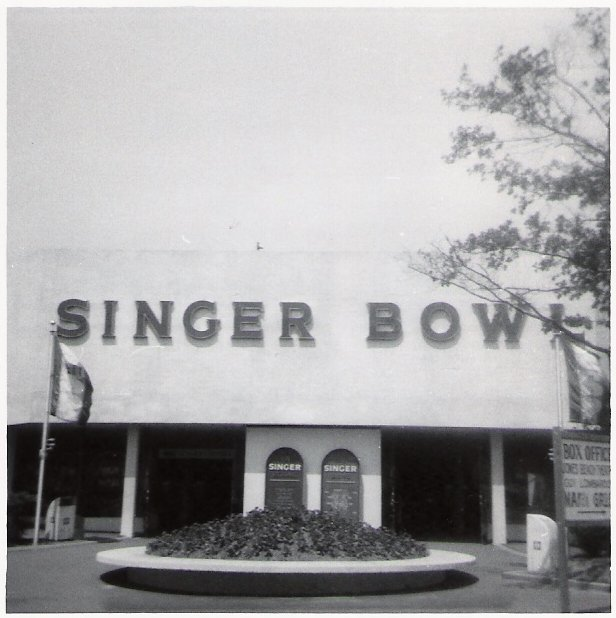
Entrance to the Singer Bowl in the New York borough of Queens. The Beach Boys–Maharishi concert at the venue was canceled after sales of just 800 tickets.

By May 4, when the tour reached Iona College in upstate New York, several of the mid-tour dates had already been canceled. Writing in New York magazine, Loraine Alterman said that, although the Maharishi's commitment to making his documentary film was given as the reason, "more likely lagging ticket sales made him meditate on the advisability of performing to half-empty houses." Earlier that day, an early-afternoon show at the 16,000-seat Singer Bowl was canceled twenty minutes before the performance, due to only 800 tickets having been sold. (Note: The likelihood of rain at the open-air venue was given as the cause for the sudden cancellation.) The Iona College show was again poorly received, and the crowd were all the more restless due to the long delay between the Beach Boys' set and the Maharishi's arrival. Alterman reported that, with the Beach Boys having joined the audience for the lecture, Bruce Johnston was visibly irritated by the fans' ridiculing of the guru, and Love returned to the stage to admonish the hecklers, adding: "I know there are a lot of young people here but you will get older and I know you'll want to remember the Maharishi at Iona." At The Spectrum in Philadelphia, around a third of the 17,000-plus seats had been sold, at reduced prices, and some people walked out rather than listen to the Maharishi. The Maharishi's teachings on spirituality held little appeal for the Beach Boys' fan base.

On May 5, the tour recorded a healthy 3000 tickets sold at the 3277-seat Bushnell Memorial Hall in Hartford, Connecticut. After this early afternoon show, however, that evening's concert at Providence Arena was canceled at the last minute. A spokesman for the venue said he was told that the Maharishi had opted to focus instead on his film commitments, and the Beach Boys would not consider performing alone. In his Radio 1 interview, Grillo recalled that the band then announced to the press that the Maharishi's exit from the tour was due to illness. Grillo added that, while the Maharishi had been unwell, the tour's cancellation was in fact motivated by the band wishing to avoid creating tension between the guru and Four Star Television, and to avoid losing more money. All of the scheduled concerts starting with the May 6 booking at Boston Garden were canceled. In the May 11 issue of Billboard magazine, it was announced that jazz musician Paul Horn, who had also attended the retreat in Rishikesh, had formed a production company to make the Four Star documentary.

In June 1968, Amusement Business magazine reported that "the Beach Boys camp insists that the lingering atmosphere of hostility and violence" in the wake of King's death had been the cause of the tour's cancellation, and not the Maharishi's failure to draw crowds. Carl Wilson told the magazine: "A lot of people just would not let their children out. Nobody wants to get hurt." He added that the group's goal was to appeal mainly to young people, "but not the teeny-boppers", while Love commented that the shows were "not put together for commercial purposes".

== Aftermath ==
Lennon and McCartney expressed concerns over the Maharishi on The Tonight Show in mid May. McCartney—who had attempted to dissuade Love from undertaking the concerts—ridiculed the tour as a failure. Others criticized Love for attempting to align himself with the contemporary trend for Eastern mysticism. In Jardine's opinion, the tour "completely fell on its ass" since the two acts "had distinct paths, neither of which belonged on the same stage together". The Beach Boys' declining popularity in the US was further reflected in the commercial failure of Friends, which peaked at number 126 on Billboard's albums chart, with total US sales estimated at 18,000 copies. Speaking to Keith Altham of the NME later in the year, Johnston said the tour was "a costly mistake for us but that's showbiz!" He added that, while their popularity on the West Coast had suffered, the band had recently toured successfully in other areas of the US. (Note: In his update on the Beach Boys for the June 1 issue of Melody Maker, Alan Walsh wrote that "a complete embargo on questions about the Maharishi and the tour" had been one of the stipulations of his phone call with Carl Wilson and Love.)

In his book Turn Off Your Mind: The Mystic Sixties and the Dark Side of the Age of Aquarius, Gary Lachman describes the Beach Boys' professional collaboration with the Maharishi as a "disastrous flirtation" that, for Dennis Wilson, was soon superseded by a more damaging personal association with the Manson Family cult. Despite the ignominy of the 1968 tour, the Beach Boys remained ardent supporters of the Maharishi and his teachings. In June 1969, the band played two charity shows at the Birmingham Odeon for the UK branch of the Spiritual Regeneration Movement. Jardine became a TM initiator in 1972, as did Love, who then progressed to more advanced levels such as the TM-Sidhi Course. In 1976, Dennis Wilson said of the tour: "I don't really care that there were empty seats ... at least it got something [about spiritual enlightenment] going or started."

Author Jon Stebbins lists the 1968 tour—specifically, the fact that the band "toured with the Maharishi after the Beatles had rejected him"—among the Beach Boys' major "artistic missteps" that also included their cancellation of the Smile album and their refusal to perform at the 1967 Monterey Pop Festival. In a 2013 interview, in response to the suggestion that such a tour seemed "unthinkable" in the present day, Love said: "The '60s was a time of unthinkabilities." In his autobiography, Love writes: "I take responsibility for an idea that didn't work. But I don't regret it. I thought I could do some good for people who were lost, confused, or troubled, particularly those who were young and idealistic but also vulnerable, and I thought that was true for a whole bunch of us."

== Tour dates ==
According to David Beard and Keith Badman:

List of tour dates with date, city, venue
Date (1968)	City	Venue
May 3	Washington, D.C.	Washington Coliseum
May 3	Baltimore	Baltimore Civic Center
May 4	New Rochelle	Iona College
May 4	Philadelphia	Spectrum
May 5	Hartford	Bushnell Memorial Hall

List of canceled tour dates with date, city, venue
Date (1968)	City	Venue
May 4	Queens	Singer Bowl
May 5	Providence	Rhode Island Auditorium
May 6	Boston	Boston Garden
May 7	Waltham	Brandeis University
May 7	New Haven	New Haven Arena
May 7	Hamden	Quinnipiac College
May 8	Columbus	Veterans Memorial Auditorium
May 9	Columbus	Ohio State University
May 10	Syracuse	Syracuse University
May 10	Syracuse	Le Moyne College
May 11	Cleveland	Public Auditorium
May 12	Chicago	University of Chicago
May 13	Madison	Capitol Theater
May 14	Saint Paul	St. Paul Auditorium
May 15	Des Moines	Veterans Memorial Auditorium
May 15	Kansas City	Municipal Auditorium
May 16	St. Louis	Kiel Auditorium
May 17	Denver	Denver Auditorium
May 18	Oakland	Oakland–Alameda County Coliseum
May 19	Los Angeles	Hollywood Bowl
May 19	Las Vegas	Nevada Southern University
May 20	Stanford	Stanford University
May 21	Sacramento	Sacramento State College
May 21	San Diego	San Diego International Sports Center

== Sources ==
- Badman, Keith (2004). The Beach Boys: The Definitive Diary of America's Greatest Band, on Stage and in the Studio. San Francisco, CA: Backbeat Books. ISBN 0-87930-818-4.
- Carlin, Peter Ames (2006). Catch a Wave: The Rise, Fall & Redemption of the Beach Boys' Brian Wilson. New York, NY: Rodale. ISBN 978-1-59486-320-2.
- Doggett, Peter (2007). There's a Riot Going On: Revolutionaries, Rock Stars, and the Rise and Fall of '60s Counter-Culture. Edinburgh, UK: Canongate Books. ISBN 978-1-84195-940-5.
- Frontani, Michael R. (2007). The Beatles: Image and the Media. Jackson, MS: University Press of Mississippi. ISBN 978-1-57806-966-8.
- Gaines, Steven (1995) [1986]. Heroes & Villains: The True Story of the Beach Boys. Boston, MA: Da Capo Press. ISBN 978-0-306-80647-6.
- Goldberg, Philip (2010). American Veda: From Emerson and the Beatles to Yoga and Meditation—How Indian Spirituality Changed the West. New York, NY: Harmony Books. ISBN 978-0-385-52134-5.
- Lachman, Gary (2001). Turn Off Your Mind: The Mystic Sixties and the Dark Side of the Age of Aquarius. New York, NY: The Disinformation Company. ISBN 0-9713942-3-7.
- Lapham, Lewis (2005). With the Beatles. Brooklyn, NY: Melville House. ISBN 978-1-612193977.
- Love, Mike; with Hirsch, James S. (2017). Good Vibrations: My Life as a Beach Boy. London: Faber & Faber. ISBN 978-0-571-32469-9.
- Morgan, Johnny (2015). The Beach Boys: America's Band. New York, NY: Sterling. ISBN 978-1-4549-1709-0.
- Schinder, Scott (2007). "The Beach Boys". In Schinder, Scott; Schwartz, Andy (eds.). Icons of Rock: An Encyclopedia of the Legends Who Changed Music Forever. Westport, CT: Greenwood Press. ISBN 978-0313338458.
- Shumsky, Susan (2018). Maharishi & Me: Seeking Enlightenment with the Beatles' Guru. New York, NY: Skyhorse Publishing. ISBN 978-1-5107-2268-2.
- Stebbins, Jon (2011). The Beach Boys FAQ: All That's Left to Know About America's Band. Milwaukee, WI: Backbeat Books. ISBN 978-1-458429148.
- White, Timothy (1996). The Nearest Faraway Place: Brian Wilson, the Beach Boys, and the Southern Californian Experience. Macmillan. ISBN 0333649370.
