= Wake the World =

Single by the Beach Boys

from the album Friends
- A-side: "Do It Again"
- Released: July 8, 1968
- Recorded: March 28-31, 1968
- Studio: ID Sound and Beach Boys Studio, California
- Length: 1:28
- Label: Capitol
- Songwriters: Brian Wilson; Al Jardine
- Producer: The Beach Boys

The Beach Boys singles chronology
"Friends" (1968)	"Do It Again" / "Wake the World" (1968)	"Bluebirds over the Mountain" (1968)

"Wake the World" is a song by American rock band the Beach Boys from their 1968 album Friends. It was written by Brian Wilson and Al Jardine about getting up in the morning for work. In addition to appearing on Friends, "Wake the World" was released as B-side to "Do It Again" in July 1968. The song has since appeared multiple times on the band's live setlists and has been described as a cult favorite.

== Background ==
"Wake the World" was the first original song that Brian Wilson and Al Jardine wrote together. Jardine recalled, "I seem to remember that I was sitting at the piano with Brian, and he had the music worked out when we did 'Wake the World.' That was great; I love that song. We wrote that at his house right under that beautiful stained glass Wild Honey cover window. [...] It was a great little room."

On the song's lyrics, Jardine commented, "It was inspired by a conversation about people having to get up every day and go to work. Something, thankfully, we never had to do!" Wilson stated, "'Wake the World' was my favorite cut. It was so descriptive to how I felt about the dramatic change over from day to night."

The song was recorded in March 1968. The song was one of the few tracks that featured contributions from Mike Love, who for much of the album's recording sessions was studying with the Maharishi in India. The chorus features a tuba line.

== Release ==
In addition to appearing as the third track on the band's 1968 album Friends, "Wake the World" was released as the B-side of the band's subsequent 1968 single "Do It Again". The song also served as the title track to the 2018 compilation Wake the World: The Friends Sessions.

== Live performances ==
"Wake the World" was regularly performed live by the band during the late 1960s and early 1970s, appearing on albums such as Live in London (1970) and the archival The Beach Boys On Tour: 1968 (2018).

Brian Wilson performed the song on solo tours with Jardine in later years. Jardine explained in 2019, "We've been doing that for a couple of years now. So that one, we have been doing, come to think of it. Because, I don't know, 'cause we like it [laughs]." Jardine has also performed the song live in his solo setlist.

== Critical reception ==
"Wake the World" became a fan favorite from Friends. In a 1968 review, Rolling Stone's Arthur Schmidt named the song as one of the "great" tracks on the first side of the album that "evoke the elation of Wild Honey." Goldmine described the track as "one of true beauty with an accompanying message of peace" and noted it as "one of the best collaborative efforts between Al Jardine and Brian." Biographer Jon Stebbins said of the song, "It's incredible to think that such a well-developed composition and arrangement could be shorter than any song on the Surfin' U.S.A. LP."

== Personnel ==
Credits from John Brode, Will Crerar, Joshilyn Hoisington, and Craig Slowinski

The Beach Boys

- Al Jardine - backing vocals
- Mike Love - co-lead and backing vocals
- Brian Wilson - lead and backing vocals, grand piano, metal scrape
- Carl Wilson - co-lead and backing vocals

Additional musicians

- Arnold Belnick - violin
- Norman Botnick - viola
- David Burk - viola
- John DeVoogt - violin
- Bonnie Douglas - violin
- Dick Hyde - euphonium
- Norm Jeffries - drums, tambourine, guiro
- Tommy Morgan - harmonica (fed through fuzz pedal)
- Lyle Ritz - Fender Precision bass guitar
- Jay Rosen - violin
- Ralph Schaeffer - violin
- Paul Shure - violin
- Al Vescovo - acoustic guitar (fed through Leslie speaker)
- Murry Wilson - backing vocals
- Unknown - backing vocals
