= The Best of the Beach Boys Vol. 3 =

The Best of The Beach Boys Vol. 3

Greatest hits album by the Beach Boys
- Released: August 5, 1968
- Recorded: October 1961 – November 1967
- Genre: Rock
- Length: 28:11
- Label: Capitol
- Producer: The Beach Boys

The Beach Boys chronology
Friends (1968)	The Best of The Beach Boys Vol. 3 (1968)	Stack-o-Tracks (1968)

Professional ratings
Review scores
Source	Rating
AllMusic	3/5 stars

The Best of the Beach Boys Vol. 3 is the third in a series of compilations of hits by the Beach Boys, released on August 5, 1968, through Capitol Records. The album was primarily assembled to compensate for the poor U.S. sales of the group's Friends album. Best of the Beach Boys hit number 153 in the US during a 6-week chart stay. In the UK, it reached number 8.

This volume contained "409" even though that song had already appeared on Best of the Beach Boys Vol. 2.

== Track listing ==
Side one
No.	Title	Writer(s)	Original album	Length
1.	"God Only Knows"	Brian Wilson, Tony Asher	Pet Sounds, 1966	2:49
2.	"Dance, Dance, Dance"	B. Wilson/Carl Wilson/Mike Love	The Beach Boys Today!, 1965	1:59
3.	"409"	B. Wilson/Love/Gary Usher	Surfin' Safari, 1962	1:59
4.	"The Little Girl I Once Knew"	B. Wilson	1965 single	2:36
5.	"Frosty the Snowman"	Steve Nelson/Jack Rollins	The Beach Boys' Christmas Album, 1964	1:54
6.	"Girl Don't Tell Me"	B. Wilson	Summer Days (And Summer Nights!!), 1965	2:19

Side two
No.	Title	Writer(s)	Original album	Length
1.	"Surfin'"	B. Wilson/Love	Surfin' Safari	2:11
2.	"Heroes and Villains"	B. Wilson/Van Dyke Parks	Smiley Smile, 1967	3:36
3.	"She Knows Me Too Well"	B. Wilson/Love	The Beach Boys Today!	2:27
4.	"Darlin'"	B. Wilson/Love	Wild Honey, 1967	2:12
5.	"Good Vibrations"	B. Wilson/Love	Smiley Smile	3:35

=== British version ===
The British version of The Best of The Beach Boys Vol. 3 was released in November 1968 with 14 songs, instead of the 11 found on American version.

Side 1

1. "Do It Again" – 2:18
2. "The Warmth of the Sun" – 2:52
3. "409" – 1:58
4. "Catch a Wave" – 2:08
5. "The Lonely Sea" – 2:23
6. "Long Tall Texan" – 2:27
7. "Wild Honey" – 2:36

Side 2

1. "Darlin'" – 2:11
2. "Please Let Me Wonder" – 2:44
3. "Let Him Run Wild" – 2:21
4. "Country Air" – 2:19
5. "I Know There's an Answer" – 3:08
6. "Friends" – 2:32
7. "Heroes and Villains" – 3:36

== Charts ==
Chart (1968)	Peak position
US Billboard Top LPs	153
UK Top Albums	8
