= Live in London (The Beach Boys album) =

1970 live album by US band The Beach Boys

Live album by The Beach Boys
- Released: May 1970
- Recorded: December 8, 1968
- Venues: Finsbury Park Astoria, London
- Genre: Rock
- Length: 34:03
- Labels: EMI (UK), Capitol (US)
- Producers: Carl Wilson, Stephen Desper

The Beach Boys chronology
20/20 (1969)	Live in London (1970)	Sunflower (1970)

Alternate cover (cover picture from Top of the Pops performance in November of 1970.)
- 1971 release

Alternate cover
- Beach Boys '69 album cover

Professional ratings
Review scores
Source	Rating
AllMusic	3.5/5 stars
Blender	2/5 stars
Encyclopedia of Popular Music	2/5 stars
The Rolling Stone Album Guide	3/5 stars

Live in London is a live album by American rock band the Beach Boys released by EMI in the UK in May 1970. When released in the US on November 15, 1976, the album was renamed Beach Boys '69: The Beach Boys Live in London via Capitol Records.

== History ==
1968 was a difficult year for the Beach Boys in the USA, where their reputation had soured considerably. Yet enthusiasm for the group in Europe was still strong, as evidenced by the performance recorded in December. They had just finished recording their latest album, 20/20, though the album would not be released until February of the following year.

On November 28, 1968, the Beach Boys embarked for what would be their Fourth European tour. For this tour, Daryl Dragon, who had joined as a sideman during the Thanksgiving tour of the previous year, returned to play keyboards. Also returning were Mike Kowalski on percussion and Ed Carter on bass. Kowalski, being friends with Bruce Johnston, was hired along with Carter in July 1968 by Carl Wilson. Dragon, Kowalski, and Carter all played on the 20/20 album. They were augmented by a large horn section, which the band had also added in July. In addition to the musicians, the Beach Boys were joined by road managers Dick Duryea, Steve Korthof, and Jon Parks, as well as their engineer, Steve Desper, who brought along his $250,000 sound system. The setlist for this tour consisted of a mix of early hits such as "California Girls" and "Barbara Ann," as well as more contemporary material from Pet Sounds, Smiley Smile, Wild Honey, and Friends. As 20/20 had yet to release, no songs from it were performed except for the recently released single, "Bluebirds Over the Mountain".

On Sunday, December 1, the Beach Boys played two shows at the London Palladium. These shows were recorded by EMI for release as a live album. The British Musician's Union and the American Federation of Musicians could not resolve a dispute, so the tapes could not be used. They would eventually be released on The Beach Boys On Tour: 1968 in 2018. In the meantime, on Sunday, December 8, the Beach Boys played two shows at Finsbury Park Astoria. EMI recorded these shows as well, and these would become the basis for the Live in London album.

The album was mixed on January 27 and 28 of 1970 in Capitol studios in Hollywood, between sessions for the Beach Boys' next studio LP, Add Some Music. The album was released in the United Kingdom in May 1970.

After the surprise success of the Endless Summer and Spirit of America hits packages in 1974 and 1975, the Beach Boys had a resurgence of popularity in America, especially on the concert circuit. Capitol capitalized on this success by reissuing Live in London on November 15, 1976, this time releasing it in the United States. The reissue had art by rock artist Jim Evans, and a new title, Beach Boys '69. Besides the fact that the live performance was recorded in December 1968, the LP's appearance added confusion to the marketplace as the group had recently issued a new, live double album—The Beach Boys in Concert—on their own Brother Records label, as part of a distribution deal with their new label, Reprise. Despite this, the record became a small chart success in the US, following the Top 10 placing of 15 Big Ones, reaching #75 in the Fall of 1976 during a US chart stay of 10 weeks. The UK edition failed to chart.

Beach Boys observers believe that the group owed Capitol one more album (this may have been offered to fill such a role, instead of the Fading Rock Group Revival/Reverberation project), and that this release ended their relationship with that record label. When the Beach Boys' albums were remastered for CD in 1990 (and again in 2001), Live in London was paired with their 1964 live release Beach Boys Concert.

== Track listing ==
All tracks written by Brian Wilson and Mike Love, unless otherwise noted.

Side one

1. "Darlin'" – 2:41
2. "Wouldn't It Be Nice" (Brian Wilson, Tony Asher, Mike Love) – 1:53
3. "Sloop John B" (Traditional; arranged by Brian Wilson) – 2:30
4. "California Girls" – 2:19
5. "Do It Again" – 2:47
6. "Wake the World" (Brian Wilson, Al Jardine) – 2:26
7. "Aren't You Glad" – 3:09

Side two

1. "Bluebirds over the Mountain" (Ersel Hickey) – 2:53
2. "Their Hearts Were Full of Spring" (Bobby Troup) – 2:49
3. "Good Vibrations" – 4:36
4. "God Only Knows" (Brian Wilson, Tony Asher) – 3:27
5. "Barbara Ann" (Fred Fassert) – 2:32
- In 1990, Live in London was paired on CD with Beach Boys Concert, featuring two live bonus tracks from 1964 ("Don't Worry Baby") and 1967 ("Heroes and Villains"). The CD was reissued in 2001.
- The live version of "Good Vibrations" featured here was used as a B-side to “Rock 'n' Roll to the Rescue” and was also included in the game Rock Band 3.

== Personnel ==
The Beach Boys

- Mike Love - vocals, tambourine, electro-theremin on “Good Vibrations”
- Carl Wilson - vocals, lead guitar
- Al Jardine - vocals, rhythm guitar
- Dennis Wilson - vocals, drums
- Bruce Johnston - vocals, bass, organ

Additional personnel

- Daryl Dragon – piano, organ, bass on "Bluebirds over the Mountain"
- Ed Carter - bass, tambourine, lead guitar on "Bluebirds over the Mountain"
- Mike Kowalski - percussion
- Uncredited horns and possible cellos

== Sources ==
- Surf's Up: The Beach Boys On Record Brad Elliott c. 1981
- Beach Boys Concert/Live in London CD booklet notes, David Leaf, c. 1990.
- Allmusic
