= Child Is Father of the Man =

Song by the Beach Boys

from the album The Smile Sessions
- Released: October 31, 2011
- Recorded: October 11, 1966 – April 1967
- Studio: Western, Columbia, Sunset Sound, and Beach Boys, Los Angeles
- Length: 2:14
- Label: Capitol
- Songwriters: Brian Wilson; Van Dyke Parks
- Producer: Brian Wilson

Music video
- "Child Is Father of the Man" on YouTube

"Child Is Father of the Man" is a song by American rock band the Beach Boys that was written by Brian Wilson and Van Dyke Parks. It was originally recorded for the band's never-finished album Smile. In 2004, Wilson rerecorded the song for Brian Wilson Presents Smile. In 2011, the Beach Boys' original recording was released on The Smile Sessions.

The title derives from an idiom meaning that man is the product of habits and behavior developed in youth. Surviving tapes of the original recordings do not show any lyrics other than "child is father of the man". Parks penned new words for the 2004 version. The instrumentation includes keyboard, trumpet, vocal rounds, and a droning guitar saturated with reverb. Elements of the song were later reworked for the band's "Little Bird" and "Surf's Up".

== Background ==
"Child is father of the man" is an idiom originating from the poem "My Heart Leaps Up" by William Wordsworth. There are many different interpretations of the phrase, the most popular of which is that man is the product of habits and behaviors developed in youth. In a late 1966 interview, Brian Wilson remarked, "And another thing that interests me ... who was it, Karl Menninger [sic], who said, 'The child is father of the man'? That fascinates me!" (Note: Parks' father was a psychiatrist and neurologist who studied with Menninger.)

According to historian Keith Badman, Van Dyke Parks stated that there were lyrics for the song that were never originally recorded. In 2004, Parks told journalist Domenic Priore, "It was an instrumental piece until Brian asked me to put words on it in November of 2003." He said he had originally suggested the idiom to Wilson.

Brian had a fervent desire to re-invent himself as an individual, not as a boy, and that's what happened, I think. By the time I met him, he had already done "When I Grow Up (To Be A Man)"; he'd already raised the questions about being a man, and when I met him, that crisis was acute. I knew it was psychologically complex and over my head. The only way I could help with any of this, whatever it was he was going through, was refer him to that poem by Hawthorne [sic] from which the phrase "the child is father to the man" comes. He used it as part of his inquiry of Smile, as a lyric.

Wilson's 2016 memoir states that "'Child Is Father of the Man' was about mental health and knowing yourself so you could do the right things in the world."

== Recording ==
The instrumental track for "Child Is Father of the Man" was recorded on October 7 ("Version 1") and October 11, 1966 ("Version 2") at Western Studio. The latter was logged as a "Cabin Essence" session. Biographer Jon Stebbins described the track as "a brooding and expansive aura, with a plaintive harmonica [sic] line not dissimilar to those heard on Ennio Morricone Spaghetti Western soundtracks."

Vocals were overdubbed by the group on October 12 and December 2 at Columbia Studio. Band archivist Mark Linett later said that there are vocal parts obscured by Carl Wilson's singing on the track. Linett said, "When he's not singing, you can hear faint background vocal parts that no longer exist on the multitrack. They must have been in his headphones, and were picked up by the vocal mic. It could be that Brian decided he didn't need them, or that he was going to re-record them, but never did. You hear this sort of stuff throughout the tapes."

A mix of "Child Is Father of the Man" was compiled in late 1966 and later released on the 2018 compilation Wake the World: The Friends Sessions. In April 1967, the band revisited the song at Sound Recorders. Brian played grand piano while he and his bandmates sang vocals. The tape was logged as "Tune X" on the box and slated as "Nowhere" on the session tape.

== Legacy ==
In 1968, the song's chorus was rewritten and rerecorded as the chorus for "Little Bird" from Friends.

In 1971, when the band completed "Surf's Up" for their album of the same name, the coda included a reworking of the chorus from "Child Is Father of the Man". Writing in a 1996 online Q&A, band manager Jack Rieley wrote that Brian had "stated clearly that it was his intent all along for Child [Is Father of the Man] to be the tag for Surfs Up [sic]."

== Personnel ==
Per band archivist Craig Slowinski.

Version 1 (October 7, 1966)

- Hal Blaine – drums, overdubbed tambourine
- Jimmy Bond – upright bass
- Frank Capp – vibraphone
- Carol Kaye – Fender bass
- Bill Pitman – electric baritone lead guitar
- Brian Wilson – grand piano
- Carl Wilson – castanet

Version 2 (October 11 – December 2, 1966)

- Jimmy Bond – upright bass
- Bruce Johnston – vocals
- Al Jardine – vocals
- Carol Kaye – Fender bass
- Mike Love – vocals
- Ollie Mitchell – trumpet
- Bill Pitman – electric baritone lead guitar (chorus and verse)
- Brian Wilson – vocals, tack piano (chorus and verse), grand piano (bridge), overdubbed snare drum in chorus (uncertain credit)
- Carl Wilson – vocals, electric rhythm guitar (verse), overdubbed sleigh bells in chorus (uncertain credit)

Version 3 (circa April 10, 1967)

- Mike Love – vocals
- Al Jardine – vocals
- Brian Wilson – vocals, grand piano
- Carl Wilson – vocals
