= Stack-o-Tracks =

Remix album by the Beach Boys
- Released: August 19, 1968
- Recorded: July 1963 – June 1968
- Genre: Instrumental rock · pop
- Length: 34:37
- Label: Capitol
- Producer: The Beach Boys

The Beach Boys chronology
Best of The Beach Boys Vol. 3 (1968)	Stack-o-Tracks (1968)	20/20 (1969)

Professional ratings
Review scores
Source	Rating
AllMusic	1.5/5 stars
Encyclopedia of Popular Music	2/5 stars
The Guardian	1/5 stars
The Rolling Stone Album Guide	2/5 stars

Stack-o-Tracks is an instrumental album release by the Beach Boys containing backing tracks to fifteen of their songs spanning their career to that point. As it was issued during one of their lowest commercial ebbs in the US, Stack-o-Tracks became the first Beach Boys album to fail to reach the US charts. Until 1992's Summer in Paradise, it would remain their only official release to have this distinction.

The US versions of the album included a booklet with the bass lines, lead lines, chords and lyrics (to sing along with), whereas European editions contained just the lyrics and a different cover. Stack-o-Tracks quickly disappeared and was out of print for two decades. In 1990, Capitol Records re-issued it on CD, and again in 2001 - both releases without the booklet that accompanied the vinyl edition.

Stack-o-Tracks was only available in Duophonic, or fake stereo.

Carl Wilson said of the album in 1971: "You'd probably be surprised at what was under the vocals. It was what was really behind them, too. Just the music tracks from our records — I like that."

== Availability ==
Stack-o-Tracks was hurriedly withdrawn after its original release, but was released in the United Kingdom in 1977, a version which was then imported back to the United States. In 1990, Stack-o-Tracks was re-released as a single-CD double-set with the informal album Beach Boys' Party! (1966). The two albums were remastered and re-released on one CD again in 2001; The Guardian's Alexis Petridis describes both albums as "contract-filling". Uncut critic Ian MacDonald felt that its inclusion in the 2001 series of remastered 1960s Beach Boys albums was at the expense of 1964's Christmas Album.

== Critical reception ==
Many writers identified Stack-o-Tracks as a collection of instrumental remixes of famous Beach Boys songs, over which listeners could sing the removed lyrics, with the accompanying booklet providing the lyrics as well as chord notations for guitarists. In 1973, New Musical Express critic Jonh Ingham noted that, although initially issued during a lull in the group's activities, it had become their rarest album. He believed "it offers interesting insight into how BB songs are constructed. Were you aware nearly all the melody lines are supplied by voices?" The Evening Mail deemed it a "curious" release that allows listeners to pretend to be "a real Beach Boy", deeming it fun for "a singalong Christmas party." Musician writer Geoffrey Himes believes that, even with their famous vocals removed, "Brian's songs are surprisingly complex", recommending both Stack-o-Tracks and the two instrumentals on Pet Sounds (1966) as evidence. David Barron of Tyler Morning Telegraph dismissed it as "one of the true examples of corporate gall of this century", questioning why anyone would "pay $7 or $8 for a glorified version of 'Sing Along with Mike, Brian, Dennis, Carl and Al'?"

Stack-o-Tracks has gone on to be considered a precursor to karaoke, or as a karaoke album itself. Richie Unterberger of AllMusic describes Stack-O-Track as "one of the oddest albums released by a major rock group in the '60s", believing its release indicated how poor the Beach Boys' sales had become that Capitol "was desperate enough to put out the kind of release that usually only surfaces via bootleg." Unterberger said the record would appeal mostly to collectors and "Beach Boys scholars who want to dig a little deeper into the instrumental tracks than they can otherwise". San Francisco Examiner critic Joel Selvin considers it "one of the strangest albums ever made by a major group". In The Rolling Stone Album Guide (1983), Dave Marsh described Stack-o-Tracks as "an oddity: instrumental tracks only from a variety of the group's best known songs—perfect for aspiring vocalists." In the 2004 update of the book, Jason Fine described it as "essentially just a Beach Boys karaoke record containing just instrumental backing tracks that 'you can play along to' – fascinating for Beach Boys obsessives, perhaps, but unnecessary for anyone else."

== Track listing ==
All tracks are written by Brian Wilson & Mike Love except where noted.

Side one
No.	Title	Writer(s)	Origin	Length
1.	"Darlin'"		Wild Honey, 1967	2:12
2.	"Salt Lake City"		Summer Days (And Summer Nights!!), 1965	1:58
3.	"Sloop John B"	Traditional, arranged by Wilson	Pet Sounds, 1966	3:04
4.	"In My Room"	Wilson; Gary Usher	Surfer Girl, 1963	2:13
5.	"Catch a Wave"		Surfer Girl	2:00
6.	"Wild Honey"		Wild Honey	2:35
7.	"Little Saint Nick"		The Beach Boys' Christmas Album, 1964	1:49
Total length:				15:51

Side two
No.	Title	Writer(s)	Origin	Length
8.	"Do It Again"		20/20, 1969	2:11
9.	"Wouldn't It Be Nice"	Wilson; Love; Tony Asher	Pet Sounds	2:11
10.	"God Only Knows"	Wilson; Asher	Pet Sounds	2:37
11.	"Surfer Girl"	Wilson	Surfer Girl	2:16
12.	"Little Honda"		All Summer Long. 1964	1:36
13.	"Here Today"	Wilson; Asher	Pet Sounds	3:06
14.	"You're So Good to Me"		Summer Days (And Summer Nights!!)	1:55
15.	"Let Him Run Wild"		Summer Days (And Summer Nights!!)	2:13
Total length:				18:05

Beach Boys' Party! / Stack-O-Tracks bonus tracks

In 1990, Stack-o-Tracks was paired on CD with Beach Boys' Party!, with bonus instrumental tracks. While Stack-o-Tracks was originally available only in mono or Duophonic sound, the CD includes true stereo mixes of several tracks. The Party! / Stack-o-Tracks CD was reissued in 2001.

No.	Title	Writer(s)	Origin	Length
16.	"Help Me, Rhonda"	Wilson	Summer Days (And Summer Nights!!)	2:54
17.	"California Girls"		Summer Days (And Summer Nights!!)	2:45
18.	"Our Car Club"		Little Deuce Coupe, 1963	2:14
