= Let Him Run Wild =

1965 song by the Beach Boys

- U.S. picture sleeve (reverse)

Single by the Beach Boys

from the album Summer Days (And Summer Nights!!)
- A-side: "California Girls"
- Released: July 12, 1965
- Recorded: March 20 – May 28, 1965
- Studio: Western and Columbia, Hollywood
- Genre: Sunshine pop
- Length: 2:20
- Label: Capitol
- Songwriters: Brian Wilson; Mike Love
- Producer: Brian Wilson

The Beach Boys singles chronology
"Help Me, Rhonda" (1965)	"California Girls" / "Let Him Run Wild" (1965)	"The Little Girl I Once Knew" (1965)

Licensed audio
- "Let Him Run Wild" on YouTube

"Let Him Run Wild" is a song by the American rock band the Beach Boys from their 1965 album Summer Days (And Summer Nights!!). Written by Brian Wilson and Mike Love, it was issued as the B-side to "California Girls."

== Background and lyrics ==
"Let Him Run Wild" was one of the first songs that Brian Wilson wrote while under the influence of marijuana. According to Wilson, the song is "about a girl who was dating a guy who didn’t stay close to her. The guy singing wants the girl to let her boyfriend run around and eventually leave her so he can come in and get her. He wants a bad thing to happen so that it’ll turn into a good thing."

Biographer Peter Ames Carlin suggested that the song was inspired by the extramarital affairs of Brian's father Murry.

== Production ==
A soulful ballad, the song is said to have been inspired by Burt Bacharach while also foreshadowing the relatively complex music dynamics of Pet Sounds several months later. Author Jim Fusilli explained, "[it] is a gorgeous track, albeit a bit busy at the chorus when compared to what's ahead, with major seventh chords that ring beautifully. The song's subtle horn charts, prominent tremolo bass, the vibraphone, and the sweet, pensive section after the chorus portend the sounds of a forthcoming classic." MOJO wrote: "With key and tempo changes bolder and weirder than anything before, this was Brian's signpost to the psychedelic country up ahead."

With production by Brian Wilson and engineering by Chuck Britz, the instrumental was recorded on March 20, 1965, at United Western Recorders, Hollywood. A few weeks later, vocals were overdubbed at CBS Columbia Square with a final mix occurring on May 28. Brian later reflected that his vocal on the track was too shrill, saying, "I sounded like a little girl," and "I sounded like a fairy," naming it his least favorite Beach Boys recording. This caused Brian Wilson to remake the song on Imagination.

== Reception ==
Cash Box described it as an "interesting weeper which blends in generous portions of counterpoint and harmony." Record World called it a "full-sounding number" that would get plays despite being a B-side. George Harrison kept the record on his jukebox at the time.

Among the band members, Carl and Dennis Wilson reflected on "Let Him Run Wild" as the point where they began to take notice of their eldest brother's true talents as a writer and arranger. Al Jardine expressed a similar sentiment, stating, "In terms of the musical direction Brian was going, I always thought that 'Let Him Run Wild' was the turning point, the beginning of that phase when things began to get more complicated."

== Variations ==
- An instrumental version is found on the 1968 Stack-O-Tracks compilation.
- The 1990/2001 reissue of Summer Days (And Summer Nights!!) includes among the bonus tracks a version of the song with alternate backing vocals.
- Brian Wilson recorded a version of the song on his 1998 solo album Imagination.
- The 2007 compilation The Warmth of the Sun featured the first stereo mix of the song.

== Personnel ==
Sourced from Musician's Union AFM contract sheets and surviving session audio, documented by Craig Slowinski.

The Beach Boys

- Al Jardine – harmony and backing vocals, handclaps
- Bruce Johnston – harmony and backing vocals, handclaps
- Mike Love – harmony and backing vocals, handclaps
- Brian Wilson – lead, harmony and backing vocals, handclaps
- Carl Wilson – harmony and backing vocals, handclaps, twelve-string guitar
- Dennis Wilson – harmony and backing vocals, handclaps, tambourine

Additional musicians

- Jerry Cole – electric guitar (uncertain)
- Barney Kessel – acoustic guitar (uncertain)
- Hal Blaine – drums, temple blocks
- Jimmy Bond – acoustic bass
- Al De Lory – piano (uncertain)
- Frank Capp – vibraphone
- Roy Caton – trumpet (uncertain)
- Steve Douglas – tenor saxophone
- Plas Johnson – tenor saxophone (uncertain)
- Jay Migliori – baritone saxophone (uncertain)
- Carol Kaye – bass guitar
- Howard Roberts – archtop acoustic guitar
- Leon Russell – electric piano
- Billy Strange – wood block hit on tambourine
- Ron Swallow – handclaps
