= Busy Doin' Nothin' =

Song by the Beach Boys

from the album Friends
- Released: June 24, 1968
- Recorded: March 26 and April 11, 1968
- Studio: ID Sound and Beach Boys Studio, California
- Genre: Bossa nova, pop
- Length: 3:04
- Label: Capitol
- Songwriter: Brian Wilson
- Producer: The Beach Boys

"Busy Doin' Nothin'" is a song by the American rock band the Beach Boys from their 1968 album Friends. Written by Brian Wilson, the lyrics reflect the minutiae of his daily social and business life, while the music, Wilson said, was inspired by "bossa nova in general".

== Recording ==
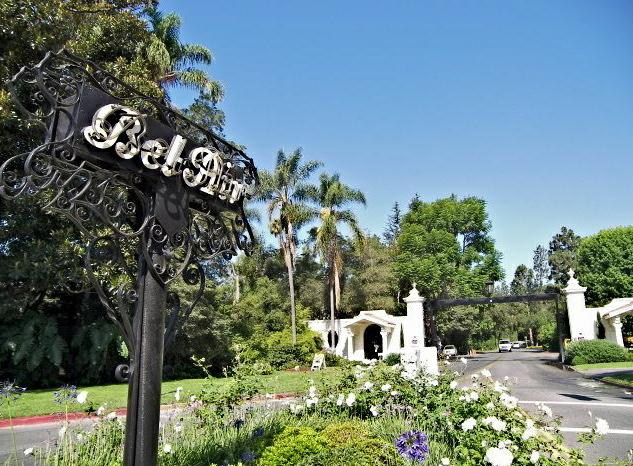
Bel Air, Los Angeles, where Wilson lived in the late 1960s and 1970s.

"Busy Doin' Nothin'" was recorded over two dates, one for the basic instrumental track and another for overdubs, including the vocal track. The basic instrumental track was recorded at Beach Boys Studio on March 26, 1968, under the working titles "Even Steven" and "Even Time". The session used several members of the Wrecking Crew.

Overdubs and the vocal track were recorded on April 11, 1968, at ID Sound, California. The vocal track has Brian singing the lead vocal, briefly joined by his then-wife Marilyn Wilson who sings with Brian during the second bridge.

Biographer John Tobler noted a resemblance between Wilson's vocal performance and that of Chris Montez's on the latter's 1966 rendition of "The More I See You".

== Live performances ==
"Busy Doin' Nothin'" was performed in the early 2000s by Brian Wilson during his Pet Sounds solo tour as well as the No Pier Pressure tour in 2015. The song was performed as part of the Brian Wilson & The Zombies: Something Great From '68 2019 tour.

== Cover versions ==
- 2000 – Camping, Caroline Now!

== Personnel ==
Per John Brode, Will Crerar, Joshilyn Hoisington, and Craig Slowinski.

The Beach Boys

- Brian Wilson - lead vocals

Guests

- Marilyn Wilson - unison vocals
- Diane Rovell - unison vocals
- Audree Wilson - backing vocals
- Murry Wilson - backing vocals

Session musicians

- Jim Ackley - Rock-Si-Chord
- Al Vescovo - acoustic guitar
- Lyle Ritz - upright bass
- Alan Estes - triangle; unused maracas
- Gene Pello - drums
- David Sherr - alto flute
- Tom Scott - alto flute
- Don Englert - alto flute
- Jay Migliori - bass clarinet
