= The Beach Boys with the Royal Philharmonic Orchestra =

2018 remix album by The Beach Boys

Remix album by the Beach Boys and the Royal Philharmonic Orchestra
- Released: June 8, 2018
- Genre: Orchestral pop
- Length: 53:54
- Label: Capitol
- Producer: Nick Patrick; Don Reedman; Jerry Schilling (executive)

The Beach Boys chronology
1967 – Live Sunshine (2017)	The Beach Boys with the Royal Philharmonic Orchestra (2018)	Wake the World: The Friends Sessions (2018)

The Beach Boys with the Royal Philharmonic Orchestra is a 2018 album of remixed Beach Boys recordings with new orchestral arrangements performed by the Royal Philharmonic Orchestra. It was produced by Nick Patrick and Don Reedman, who conducted similar projects for Roy Orbison and Elvis Presley.

The Royal Philharmonic recorded its portions at Abbey Road Studio 2. The Rhythm Tracks were recorded at Abbey Road Studio 2 and The Bunker, in London's West End. The album was mixed at Shine Music Studios in London and mastered at Capitol Studios in Los Angeles.

== Promotion ==
Members Al Jardine, Bruce Johnston, David Marks, Mike Love, and Brian Wilson reunited for a question and answer session with Rob Reiner on July 30, 2018 to promote the album; it was the first time since The 50th Reunion Tour that they appeared together in public.

== Reception ==
Stephen Thomas Erlewine of AllMusic wrote that the songs "either seem weighed down by an orchestra... or the strings seem extraneous", summing it up as an "exercise in mawkish nostalgia".

The album topped the Billboard Classical Crossover Albums and Top Classical Albums charts, selling 5,000 copies in its first week.

== Track listing ==
1. "California Suite" (Sally Herbert) – 1:32
2. "California Girls" (Mike Love, Brian Wilson) – 2:45
3. "Wouldn't It Be Nice" (Tony Asher, Love, Wilson) – 3:13
4. "Fun, Fun, Fun" (Love, Wilson) – 2:23
5. "Don't Worry Baby" (Roger Christian, Wilson) – 2:50
6. "God Only Knows" (Asher, Wilson) – 3:12
7. "Sloop John B" (traditional) – 3:43
8. "Heroes and Villains" (Van Dyke Parks, Wilson) – 4:07
9. "Disney Girls" (Bruce Johnston) – 4:36
10. "Here Today" (Asher, Wilson) – 3:07
11. "In My Room" (Gary Usher, Wilson) – 2:32
12. "Kokomo" (Love, Scott McKenzie, Terry Melcher, John Phillips) – 3:50
13. "The Warmth of the Sun" (Love, Wilson) – 3:15
14. "Darlin'" (Love, Wilson) – 2:18
15. "Help Me, Rhonda" (Love, Wilson) – 3:00
16. "You Still Believe in Me" (Asher, Wilson) – 3:11
17. "Good Vibrations" (Love, Wilson) – 4:20

== Personnel ==
Adapted from AllMusic.

The Beach Boys (original recordings)

- Al Jardine – vocals, guitar, bass guitar
- Bruce Johnston – vocals, percussion, mandolin, Moog bass, piano
- Mike Love – vocals
- David Marks – guitar
- Brian Wilson – vocals, harpsichord, organ, percussion, piano, tack piano
- Carl Wilson – vocals, guitar, percussion, ukulele
- Dennis Wilson – vocals, drums, organ, percussion

Session musicians (original recordings)

- Guitar: Glen Campbell, Ed Carter, Al Casey, Jerry Cole, Ry Cooder, Mike Deasy, Jeffrey Foskett, Carol Kaye,
  Barney Kessel, John Parricelli, Bill Pitman, Howard Roberts, Billy Strange
- Mandolin: Ry Cooder
- Ukulele: Barney Kessel, Howard Roberts
- Bass: Ron Brown, Rod Clark, Carol Kaye, Bill Pitman, Ray Pohlman, Lyle Ritz, Arthur G. Wright
- Keyboards: Al De Lory, Steve Douglas, Dominic Ferris, Tommy Gerard, Larry Knechtel, Michael Melvoin,
  Van Dyke Parks, Don Randi, Leon Russell
- Accordion: Carl Fortina, Tommy Gerard, Frank Marocco, Van Dyke Parks
- Drums: Hal Blaine, Dennis Dragon, Jim Gordon, Jim Keltner, Nick Martinis, Ralph Salmins
- Percussion: Harold Billings, Hal Blain, Frank Capp, Chili Charles, Vince Charles, Gary Coleman,
  Steve Douglas, Gene Estes, Tommy Gerard, Jim Gordon, Jim Keltner, Terry Melcher, Tony Mercury,
  Billy Strange, Paul Tanner, Julius Wechter
- Saxophone: Bill Green, Plas Johnson, Jay Migliori, Jack Nimitz, Joel Peskin
- Harmonica: Tommy Morgan
- Clarinet: Bill Green, Leonard Hartman, Jim Horn, Plas Johnson, Jay Migliori
- Flute: Steve Douglas, Kathy Dragon, Bill Green, Leonard Hartman, Jim Horn, Jay Migliori
- French Horn: George Hyde, Alan Robinson
- Violin: Leonard Malarsky, Sid Sharp, Darrel Terwilliger
- Cello: Jesse Ehrlich
- Double Bass: Buell Neidlinger, Steve Pearce, Lyle Ritz
- Horns: Roy Caton, Virgil Evans, Gail Martin, Ernie Tack
