= You're So Good to Me =

- U.S. picture sleeve (reverse)

Single by the Beach Boys

from the album Summer Days (And Summer Nights!!)
- A-side: "Sloop John B"
- Released: March 21, 1966
- Recorded: May 24, 1965
- Studio: Western and Columbia, Hollywood
- Genre: Rock; soul; pop
- Length: 2:16
- Label: Capitol
- Songwriters: Brian Wilson; Mike Love
- Producer: Brian Wilson

The Beach Boys singles chronology
| "Barbara Ann" (1965) | "Sloop John B" / "You're So Good to Me" (1966) | "Wouldn't It Be Nice" / "God Only Knows" (1966) |

Licensed audio
- "You're So Good to Me" on YouTube

"You're So Good to Me" is a song written by Brian Wilson and Mike Love for the American rock band the Beach Boys, released on July 5, 1965, on their ninth studio album Summer Days (And Summer Nights!!). It was later included as the B-side of the group's single "Sloop John B", which was released on March 21, 1966. Mojo later wrote that the song was the closest the group had come to northern soul.

== Background and recording ==
Brian Wilson wrote "You're So Good to Me" while in Hawaii. He commented on the song, "The ones that aren't the hardest, right, they're the best... 'You're So Good to Me' was written in 20 minutes. I knew it was special. The songs that come the fastest are the ones I like the most."

The basic track for "You're So Good to Me" was recorded at Western Studios in early May 1965. Take 24 was used as the master. On May 24, the lead and backing vocals for the song were recorded at Columbia Studios. Wilson wrote in 1990 that the track was "spearheaded by a guitar sent through a Leslie speaker. It gave it an eerie effect."

Wilson dubbed it a "tongue song" for its repeated "la, la, la" backing vocals in the chorus.

== Personnel ==
According to band researcher Craig Slowinski:

The Beach Boys

- Brian Wilson – lead and backing vocals, piano, handclaps
- Al Jardine – backing vocals, electric rhythm guitar, bass guitar
- Bruce Johnston – backing vocals, Hammond organ
- Mike Love – backing vocals
- Carl Wilson – backing vocals, electric lead and rhythm guitars
- Dennis Wilson – drums

Additional musicians

- Ron Swallow – tambourine
- Marilyn Wilson – possible backing vocals

== Alternate versions ==
In 2007, the compilation The Warmth of the Sun released the first stereo remix of "You're So Good to Me". Previously, the song was only available in monophonic and duophonic capacities.

== Cover versions ==
- 1965 - Debra Swisher, single
- 1966 - The Factotums, single
- 1968 - The Kit Kats, single
- 1976 – Design, single
- 1976 – The Langley Schools Music Project, Lochiel, Glenwood, and South Carvolth Schools
- 1994 – Velocity Girl, "Your Silent Face" B-side
- 2001 – Wilson Phillips, An All-Star Tribute to Brian Wilson
- 2005 – Math and Physics Club, Movie Ending Romance
- 2016 – M. Ward, More Rain
