= Little Bird (The Beach Boys song) =

Single by the Beach Boys

from the album Friends
- A-side: "Friends"
- Released: April 8, 1968
- Recorded: February 29, 1968
- Studio: Beach Boys Studio, Los Angeles
- Length: 1:57
- Label: Capitol
- Songwriters: Dennis Wilson; Stephen Kalinich
- Producer: The Beach Boys

The Beach Boys singles chronology
"Darlin'" (1967)	"Little Bird" (1968)	"Do It Again" (1968)

"Little Bird" is a song by American rock band the Beach Boys from their 1968 album Friends. It was credited to Dennis Wilson and Stephen Kalinich. Brian Wilson also contributed to it, but he declined a songwriting credit. The track was placed as the B-side of the album's "Friends" single, which peaked at number 47 in the US and number 25 in the UK.

== Background ==
Brian recalled; "Dennis gave us 'Little Bird' which blew my mind because it was so full of spiritualness. He was a late bloomer as a music maker. He lived hard and rough but his music was as sensitive as anyone's." The outro of "Little Bird" features music reworked from Brian's unfinished 1966 composition "Child Is Father of the Man", originally intended for the Smile album. Brian's contribution remains uncredited.

According to Kalinich, Brian rewrote virtually all of the composition. "I always claimed Brian wrote the bridge and changed my words around, but he also changed the whole melody. I talked to Brian recently and he said, 'Well, I touched it up, arranged it and produced it.' So he calls that an arrangement, but it's really a rewrite. Brian didn't take credit. He was trying to help his little brother." Kalinich recalls first hearing the recorded song "on an LA side walk through a payphone" outside his apartment, as he had given the Beach Boys that number, and Al Jardine called to play a preview.

== Reception ==
Matthew Greenwald of AllMusic called the song a "wonderful surprise" from Dennis: "[his] earthy ability to capture his love of the power of nature is the basis for this minor masterpiece, and along with talented collaborator Steve Kalinich, he was able to nail his emotions."

== Personnel ==
Per John Brode, Will Crerar, Joshilyn Hoisington, and Craig Slowinski.

The Beach Boys

- Al Jardine – backing vocals
- Bruce Johnston – backing vocals
- Brian Wilson – co-lead and backing vocals, harmonium
- Carl Wilson – co-lead and backing vocals, 12-string electric guitar
- Dennis Wilson – lead vocals

Session musicians

- Al Vescovo – acoustic guitar, banjo
- Lyle Ritz – Fender Precision bass guitar
- Jim Gordon – drums, triangle
- Ollie Mitchell – trumpet (including solo)
- Roy Caton, Dick Forrest, Tony Terran – trumpets
- Raymond Kelley, Jacqueline Lustgarden – cellos

== Cover versions ==
- 2012 – Of Montreal
