= The Little Girl I Once Knew =

1965 single by the Beach Boys

- U.S. picture sleeve

Single by the Beach Boys
- B-side: "There's No Other (Like My Baby)"
- Released: November 22, 1965
- Recorded: October 13–24, 1965
- Studio: Western, Hollywood
- Genre: Avant-pop
- Length: 2:35
- Label: Capitol
- Songwriter: Brian Wilson
- Producer: Brian Wilson

The Beach Boys singles chronology
"California Girls" (1965)	"The Little Girl I Once Knew" (1965)	"Barbara Ann" (1965)

Licensed audio
- "The Little Girl I Once Knew" on YouTube

Audio sample
- file; help

"The Little Girl I Once Knew" is a song by the American rock band the Beach Boys that was issued as a standalone single on November 22, 1965. Written and produced by Brian Wilson, it was recorded during the making of the band's 1966 album Pet Sounds.

Recorded in October 1965, "The Little Girl I Once Knew" is an avant-pop song that is distinguished for employing several abrupt pauses in its structure, as the music shifts from a heavily orchestrated arrangement to complete silence for multiple bars. It also features a prominent bass part performed by session musician Carol Kaye and vocal contributions by all members of the group.

Despite a printed endorsement from Beatle John Lennon, the single reached only number 20 on the U.S. Billboard charts, marking the band's lowest entry there for an A-sided single since 1963. Because of the track's momentary periods of silence, many disc jockeys at the time had omitted the song from radio playlists to avoid dead air. The relatively poor commercial performance may have been a factor in Wilson's decision to omit the song from Pet Sounds.

Retrospectively, critics have praised the song for its ambitious arrangement and production, and have described it as a turning point in the group's sound and musical style, foreshadowing Wilson's further experimentation with song structure throughout 1966 and 1967 on Pet Sounds and Smile. The track's first album appearance came on the greatest hits compilation The Best of the Beach Boys, Vol. 3 (1968).

== Background and lyrics ==
Lyrically, "The Little Girl I Once Knew" follows familiar territory as the Beach Boys' 1964 outtake "All Dressed Up for School", telling the story of a guy who reacquaints with a girl from his past who has now grown up and catches his eye. According to biographer Mark Dillon, some speculate that the song was written about Brian's then-wife Marilyn Wilson. He adds that Mike Love reportedly had a hand in the lyrics, although Love's 1992 lawsuit for officially recognized writing contributions had failed to include "The Little Girl I Once Knew".

== Recording and composition ==
While the instrumental track for "Sloop John B" had been completed earlier in the summer, much of the Beach Boys' time in the studio in late 1965 had been devoted to completing the album Beach Boys' Party! in time for the holiday season in accordance with the demands of Capitol Records. "The Little Girl I Once Knew" was one of the first songs recorded for the group's next album, at that point not yet scheduled for release, which would be later named Pet Sounds. (Note: Other early tracks recorded at this stage included "Pet Sounds" (then titled "Run James Run") and "You Still Believe in Me" (then titled "In My Childhood"). Another song attempted during these sessions was "Three Blind Mice" an experimental instrumental track later released as part of The Smile Sessions.) Despite this, it was ultimately omitted from the album.

"The Little Girl I Once Knew" was initially labelled "Carol K" on its session tape box, as a reference to the song's bassist, Carol Kaye. The track has drawn comparisons with the work of contemporary songwriter Burt Bacharach, whose songwriting Wilson admired.

Two weeks after the recording for the instrumental track of "The Little Girl I Once Knew", Wilson recorded an instrumental entitled "Trombone Dixie", which recycles the main riff from the earlier song. "Trombone Dixie" was not released until 1990, as a bonus track on Pet Sounds.

The song is unusual in that it uses stop–start melody sections and a few dramatic periods of silence lasting several seconds each. Dillon writes that the verses are "low-key" and hard-shift into a "blaring chorus" that "foreshadows the Smile track 'Cabin Essence'". In a 2007 interview, Wilson stated,

That is my very favorite introduction in a song in my whole life. It kills me every time. It might have been the first time the music stopped and started again on a record. I wrote the intro at the studio before we cut the thing. And, [session musician] Larry Knechtel, it was his idea to keep the music rolling. We tried one, and then I put a second guitar overdub on top of the other guitar. And the rest of it was history. We were doing stereo but I could only hear the mono and I always put the vocals up front in the mix. Mixing in mono is good for my left ear. My right ear is broke, done and over with.

Wilson was dissatisfied with his vocal performance, calling it "too effeminate". In 1995, Wilson expressed, "It was a fine song, except the intro is the only good part of it, and the rest didn't sound so good. I thought the song in itself sucked. I didn't like the harmonies, I thought they were sour and off-key." In 2014, he said that the song "should've" gotten more attention than it did. However, Wilson has also stated that the song is "as good" or "almost as good" as "California Girls". He stated his vocals in particular were "really spectacularly great" and said, "There's no way the Beach Boys could sound any better than on "The Little Girl I Once Knew".

== Release ==
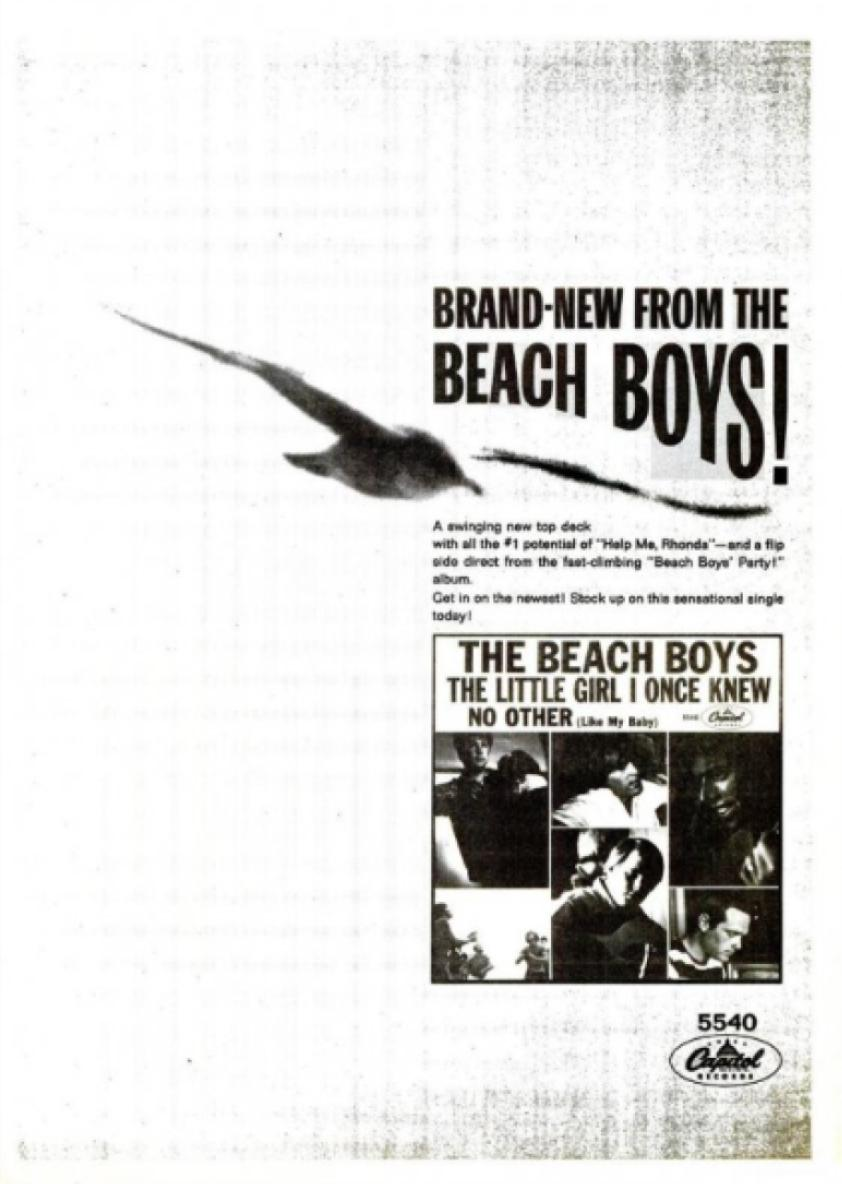
Advertisement for "The Little Girl I Once Knew", published in Billboard magazine in November 1965

On November 22, 1965, Capitol Records released "The Little Girl I Once Knew" as a single, backed by the group's cover of "There's No Other (Like My Baby)" from Beach Boys' Party! After the previous two Beach Boys singles, which peaked within the top 5, "The Little Girl I Once Knew" had a more lukewarm commercial reception, reaching #15 on the Cash Box chart and #20 on Billboard. Since radio stations preferred to avoid dead air time, the song was poorly received by disc jockeys, which contributed to its lower chart placement.

As a result of this poor commercial performance, Capitol vice president Al Coury decided to rush-release "Barbara Ann" as a single without informing the band. Wilson elected not to place it on Pet Sounds possibly for the same reason, and as a result, the track wasn't released on an album until 1968, on The Best of the Beach Boys Vol. 3.

Cash Box described the song as a "rhythmic ode about a fellow who reminisces about how his gal has grown up and become a woman." John Lennon also praised the track upon its release in the United Kingdom in an interview with Melody Maker magazine, published in December 1965.

This is the greatest! Turn it up, turn it right up. It's GOT to be a hit. It's the greatest record I've heard for weeks. It's fantastic. I hope it will be a hit. It's all Brian Wilson. He just uses the voices as instruments. He never tours or anything. He just sits at home thinking up fantastic arrangements out of his head. Doesn't even read music. You keep waiting for the fabulous breaks. Great arrangement. It goes on and on with all different things. I hope it's a hit so I can hear it all the time.

George Harrison also kept the record on his jukebox at the time.

== Retrospective assessments ==
AllMusic reviewer Matthew Greenwald called the song "a virtual link between the slightly progressive work on songs such as 'California Girls' and the then-quantum leap taken by Wilson on Pet Sounds and 'Good Vibrations'". Greenwald noted that the song was one of the first compositions by Brian Wilson to be composed of multiple sections or "feels", foreshadowing the modular recording style adopted by Wilson for Smile. Scott Itterante, writing for PopMatters magazine, named "The Little Girl I Once Knew" the 8th best song written by Wilson. Despite criticizing the song's lyrics as poorly-aged, and not as "universally appealing" as "California Girls", Itterante praises the song's "powerful layers of vocals", and describes it as a "transition track" for the band.

== Personnel ==
According to Keith Badman and Mark Dillon, except where noted:

The Beach Boys

- Mike Love – lead vocal, harmony vocal
- Brian Wilson – lead vocal, harmony vocal
- Carl Wilson – lead vocal, harmony vocal
- Al Jardine – harmony vocal
- Bruce Johnston – harmony vocal
- Dennis Wilson – harmony vocal

Session musicians

- Frank Capp – percussion
- Carol Kaye – bass
- Don Randi – organ
- Unidentified musicians – twelve-string guitar, trumpet and saxophones (Note: Dillon writes the song includes a trumpet and saxophone section but does not identify the musicians. Badman writes trumpeter Roy Canton was present at the 13 October 1965 session, along with saxophonists Jim Horn, Plas Johnson and Jay Migliori.)

== Charts ==
Weekly chart performance
Chart (1965–66)	Peak position
Canada Top Singles (RPM)	10
US Billboard Hot 100	20
US Cash Box Top 100	15
US Record World Top 100	15

== Bibliography ==
- Badman, Keith (2004). The Beach Boys: The Definitive Diary of America's Greatest Band, on Stage and in the Studio. Backbeat Books. ISBN 978-0-87930-818-6.
- Dillon, Mark (2012). Fifty Sides of the Beach Boys: The Songs that Tell Their Story. Toronto: ECW Press. ISBN 978-1-77041-071-8.
- Umphred, Neal (1997). "Let's Go Away for Awhile: The Continuing Saga of Brian Wilson's Pet Sounds". In Abbott, Kingsley (ed.). Back to the Beach: A Brian Wilson and the Beach Boys Reader. Helter Skelter. ISBN 978-1-90092-402-3.
