= Singer Bowl =

Former stadium in Queens, New York

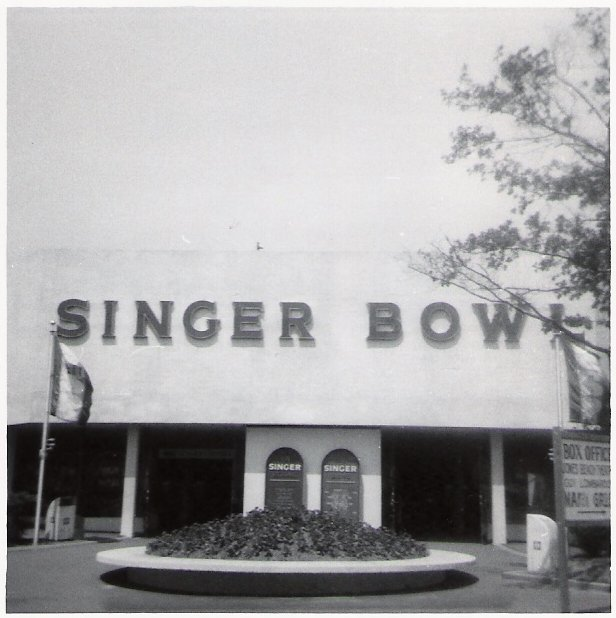
- Entrance during the 1964 World's Fair
- Interactive map of Singer Bowl
- Location: Flushing, Queens, New York, U.S.
- Coordinates: 40.751°N 73.8455°W

Construction
- Opened: 1964
- Closed: 2016

The Singer Bowl was a multipurpose stadium at Flushing Meadows–Corona Park in Queens, New York City. It was built for the 1964 New York World's Fair and demolished in 2016. Originally named for the Singer Sewing Company, it was an early example of naming rights in large venues.

== History ==
The stadium was designed by Eggers & Higgins and intended to be a temporary structure. It opened in 1964, built by the Singer Sewing Machine Company, and was donated for use at the 1964 World's Fair. It was taken over by the New York City Department of Parks and Recreation after the conclusion of the fair. It later hosted various Olympic trials and concerts, including the New York Rock Festival in 1968, a concert headlined by The Doors, with The Who as the opening act on August 2. Later in the month, The Jimi Hendrix Experience and Big Brother and the Holding Company (with Janis Joplin) were also part of the festival at the stadium. Two years after civil engineers judged its structure unsafe, the Singer Bowl was renovated by the Parks Department at a cost of $317,400 in 1971.

In the summer of 1972, professional boxing was held at the Singer Bowl. Some of the fighters who boxed there included heavyweight champion Floyd Patterson, and future world champions Vito Antuofermo and Saoul Mamby. Other boxers of note that fought at the Singer Bowl in 1972 were Edwin Viruet, John Clohessy, Roy Edmonds, Eduardo Santiago.

=== Tennis ===
In the early 1970s, the United States Tennis Association was looking for a new place to host the U.S. Open as relations with the West Side Tennis Club in Forest Hills, which had hosted the tournament, were breaking down. The USTA was initially unable to find a sufficient site, but the association's incoming president, W. E. Hester saw the old Singer Bowl from the window of an airplane flying into LaGuardia Airport. The long rectangular stadium was renamed the Louis Armstrong Memorial Stadium in 1973 after a famous Corona resident, jazz trumpeter Louis Armstrong.

Heavily renovated in 1977, it reopened in 1978 as two venues, Louis Armstrong Stadium, which had significantly more seating than the original stadium, and the adjacent Grandstand. Both were part of the present-day USTA National Tennis Center. When the USTA built Arthur Ashe Stadium next door in 1997, the largest tennis-only venue in the world, the seating capacity of Armstrong was reduced to be closer to its original format.

It was demolished in October 2016 as part of the Billie Jean King Tennis Center renovation.
