= Friends (The Beach Boys song) =

Single by the Beach Boys

from the album Friends
- B-side: "Little Bird"
- Released: April 8, 1968
- Recorded: March 13 - April 2, 1968
- Length: 2:30
- Label: Capitol
- Songwriters: Brian Wilson; Carl Wilson; Dennis Wilson; Al Jardine
- Producer: The Beach Boys

The Beach Boys singles chronology
"Darlin'" (1967)	"Friends" (1968)	"Do It Again" (1968)

"Friends" is a song by American rock band the Beach Boys from their 1968 album Friends. It was written by Brian Wilson, Carl Wilson, Dennis Wilson and Al Jardine. Sung by Carl, the song was recorded in waltz time. "Friends" was the first single from the album of the same name and has since been described as a "cult favorite."

== Background and recording ==
"Friends" was recorded on March 13, 1968. It was recorded in 4/4 time for its first take. Immediately after, Brian rearranged the song after realizing that there were not many waltzes on the radio. Brian later stated, "The cut 'Friends' was, in my opinion, a good way to keep waltzes alive." As Peter Reum, a Beach Boys historian, stated "'Friends' is a waltz, and it's been used at the Berklee College of Music to teach students how to write in 3/4 time."

"Friends" features a lead vocal performed by Carl Wilson, who had been gradually assuming more lead vocal duties to this point. Brian explained, "Carl had sung 'Darlin'' and some others before and now he spearheaded this cut with a heavy vocal performance."

Brian called the song his favorite from the Friends album. In another interview, he commented, "'Friends' is great. I though there was a lot of humor in it and I thought, y'know, songs usually don't have that much kinda humor, but 'Friends' had a lot of humor in it. So that's why I like it." Bruce Johnston, who otherwise disliked the "wimpy" nature of the Friends album, described the song as "fantastic" and praised its bassline.

== Release and sales ==
"Friends" was released as a single, with "Little Bird" as the B-side. With its gentle arrangement and simple song structure, "Friends" proved to be out of step with commercial trends and underperformed commercially. The single peaked at number 47 in the United States, becoming their first single to miss the top 40 since "The Man with All the Toys" in 1964. It fared better in the United Kingdom, peaking at number 25.

An a cappella mix was sold as a vinyl single backed with Al Jardine's Beach Boys reunion song "Don't Fight the Sea" for the charity of 2011 Tōhoku earthquake and tsunami in April 2011.

== Critical reception ==
Upon release, Cash Box spoke positively of the song, writing, "Barbershop harmonizing to a soft rock backdrop provides the Beach Boys with a departure from their 'Wild Honey'/'Good Vibrations' style. Easy-throbbing waltz tempo and a unique vocal sound cast a new type of magical spell for the team, one that should have them rising rapidly on the best seller charts. Outstanding track." In its 1968 review of the Friends album, Rolling Stone singled out the title track as a highlight, writing, "[It is] a more mature (in that it lacks their usual immediacy) evocation of the surfer 'pack' or 'club' vision — why go out with a girl when you can go cruising with the guys on Saturday nights? It's really warm, simple, touching, saying in not so many words that friendship isn’t about words."

In Disc & Music Echo, Penny Valentine wrote of the single, "Whither the progressive Beach Boys? [...] If The Beach Boys are as bored as they sound, they should stop bothering [...] They are no longer the brilliant Beach Boys. They are grey and they are making sad little grey records."

Retrospectively, biographer David Leaf praised the song's "fine melody and lovely production" and wrote, "The vocal arrangement of this track let the world know that Brian was back mixing his magical harmonic brew." Donald Guarisco of Allmusic commented, "This mellow, lovely track is a good example of the Beach Boys' late-'60s output: it is far less musically complex than 'California Girls' or 'Wouldn't It Be Nice' but possesses a homespun charm all its own." Dave Swanson of Ultimate Classic Rock noted the song's "calming nature."

== Personnel ==
Per John Brode, Will Crerar, Joshilyn Hoisington, and Craig Slowinski.

The Beach Boys

- Al Jardine - backing vocals
- Bruce Johnston - backing vocals
- Brian Wilson - harmony and backing vocals
- Carl Wilson - lead and backing vocals, electric lead guitar, 12-string electric rhythm guitar
- Dennis Wilson - backing vocals

Session musicians

- Jim Ackley - Clavinet
- Jimmy Bond - upright bass
- Norm Jeffries - drums
- Alan Estes - vibraphone
- Tommy Morgan - standard and bass harmonicas
- Jim Horn - tenor saxophone
- Jay Migliori - tenor saxophone
- Arnold Belnick, William Kurasch, Leonard Malarsky - violins
- Norman Botnick - violas

== Bibliography ==
- Badman, Keith (2004). The Beach Boys: The Definitive Diary of America's Greatest Band, on Stage and in the Studio. Backbeat Books. ISBN 978-0-87930-818-6.
