= Jon Stebbins =

- Born: Livermore, California
- Occupations: Author; musician
- Years active: 1970s–present
- Musical career
- Origin: Los Angeles, California, U.S.
- Genre: Jangle pop
- Formerly of: The Point

Jon Stebbins is a Los Osos, California-based musician, songwriter, documentary producer and author of four books about The Beach Boys, as well as two other books.

== Music career ==
Stebbins was a member of a music band called 'The Point' which was active on the Los Angeles club circuit from 1979 to 1985. The Point were often described as part of L.A.'s psychedelic revival scene known as the Paisley Underground. They released a self-titled four song EP in 1981 that was described by the L.A. Times as having a "purity of intent that recalls the haunting resonance of pre-psychedelic Northern California groups like The Beau Brummels."

The Point released a full-length album in 1983 called Magic Circle, (not to be confused with the 2005 album of the same title by Wizard.) The record was produced by Vitus Matare of The Last and recorded at Radio Tokyo studio in Venice, California and released on the Warfrat label. Magic Circle was also released in Europe in 1984 on the Lolita label. One of its songs, "All My Life" which was co-written by Stebbins and Point co-founder Tom Alford was included in a 2006 episode of the Gilmore Girls television show.

Stebbins and his former Point bandmate Tom Alford resumed their songwriting partnership in 2020. That year Alford recorded and released the Alford/Stebbins composition “Moving In To Love” which received international airplay and reached #65 on the Radio Indie Alliance chart.

Stebbins currently plays guitar (as J Uno) in the Atascadero, California-based free-form psychedelic band Juneau Teausday.

== Published works ==
Stebbins' first book, on the subject of Beach Boys drummer Dennis Wilson is entitled Dennis Wilson, The Real Beach Boy. Published in 2000, the book was ranked as the number two bestseller in MOJO magazine for that year.

In 2007 Virgin Books Ltd, London, published The Lost Beach Boy, which Stebbins wrote with David Marks, one of the early members of the Beach Boys, and which tells the story of Marks' time with the band in 1962–1963, as well as Marks' experiences after he left the Beach Boys in late 1963.

Stebbins has also written The Beach Boys FAQ - All That's Left To Know About America's Band, an extensive reference style book for Backbeat Books which was published in September 2011.

Stebbins' fourth book on the Beach Boys was published in June 2013 by Backbeat Books. Co-written with Ian Rusten, the book is titled The Beach Boys In Concert - The Complete History of America's Band On Tour and Onstage and is an unprecedented day-by-day journal of the group's 50 year touring history.

In October 2012 Stebbins' first non-Beach Boys book was published, titled It Happened At Chez Jay's chronicling the history of a legendary Santa Monica restaurant and bar, and the colorful life of its playboy owner Jay Fiondella.

Stebbins is currently writing the 75 year plus history of Universal Attractions Agency a New York-based booking agency founded in 1945 and still in operation. UAA is best known for launching the career of soul icon James Brown along with dozens of other Rhythm and Blues legends. The book is scheduled to be published in 2022.

== Other media contributions ==
Stebbins contributed liner notes and project research to the 2008 Legacy Edition CD release of Dennis Wilson's Pacific Ocean Blue which was Rolling Stone magazine's 2008 reissue of the year. He has also worked as a producer and creative contributor to television shows airing on BBC including the documentaries The Beach Boys- Wouldn't It Be Nice (2005) and Queen - Days Of Our Lives (2011), as well as two multi-episode series The Secret Map of Hollywood (2005) and I'm In A Rock And Roll Band (2010). Stebbins is also co-producer of the 2010 BBC television documentary Legends- Dennis Wilson, The Real Beach Boy which was nominated for a Royal Television Society award as best documentary. Stebbins appears as an interview subject in the ITV productions Autopsy, The Last Hours of Dennis Wilson (2017) and Breaking The Band (2018). He is a contributor and interview subject in the 2019 documentary Manson: Music from an Unsound Mind.
