= List of songs recorded by Dennis Wilson =

== Released songs ==
This list is an attempt to document every song recorded and released under the name of Beach Boys band member Dennis Wilson, whether on an album, single, compilation or anthology album (not necessarily songs written by him).

Song	Written By	Recorded	Album	Time	Producer
Album Tag Song	Dennis Wilson	March 22–23, 1977	Pacific Ocean Blue re-issue (2008)	3:45	Dennis Wilson; John Hanlon; Gregg Jakobson
All Alone	Carli Muñoz	June, 1978	Pacific Ocean Blue re-issue (2008)	3:44	Dennis Wilson; Carli Muñoz
Are You Real?	Dennis Wilson; Gregg Jakobson	1978	Pacific Ocean Blue re-issue (2008)	3:38	Dennis Wilson; John Hanlon; Gregg Jakobson
Cocktails	Dennis Wilson; Gregg Jakobson; John Hanlon	1977	Pacific Ocean Blue re-issue (2008)	3:00	Dennis Wilson; John Hanlon; Gregg Jakobson
Common	Dennis Wilson	April 3 & 13, 1978	Pacific Ocean Blue re-issue (2008)	3:34	Dennis Wilson; John Hanlon; Gregg Jakobson
Constant Companion	Carli Muñoz; Rags Baker	June 8 & July 5, 1978	Pacific Ocean Blue re-issue (2008)	3:22	Dennis Wilson; Carli Muñoz
Dreamer	Dennis Wilson; Gregg Jakobson	March 18, 1977	Pacific Ocean Blue (1977)	4:22	Dennis Wilson; Gregg Jakobson
End of The Show	Dennis Wilson; Gregg Jakobson	March 29 & April 19, 1977	Pacific Ocean Blue (1977)	2:55	Dennis Wilson; Gregg Jakobson
Farewell My Friend	Dennis Wilson	April 21, 1976	Pacific Ocean Blue (1977)	2:26	Dennis Wilson; Gregg Jakobson
Friday Night	Dennis Wilson; Gregg Jakobson	Unknown	Pacific Ocean Blue (1977)	3:09	Dennis Wilson; Gregg Jakobson
He's A Bum	Dennis Wilson; Gregg Jakobson	July–August 1977	Pacific Ocean Blue re-issue (2008)	2:50	Dennis Wilson; John Hanlon; Gregg Jakobson
Holy Man	Dennis Wilson; Gregg Jakobson	February 12, 1975	Pacific Ocean Blue re-issue (2008)	4:24	Dennis Wilson; John Hanlon; Gregg Jakobson
I Love You	Dennis Wilson; Gregg Jakobson	October 15 & November 1, 1978	Pacific Ocean Blue re-issue (2008)	2:02	Dennis Wilson; John Hanlon; Gregg Jakobson
It's Not Too Late	Carli Muñoz	May 18 & 24, & July 15, 1978	Pacific Ocean Blue re-issue (2008)	4:32	Dennis Wilson; Carli Muñoz
Lady	Dennis Wilson	December 26, 1969; January 26, 1970	single release only (1970)	2:24	Unknown
Love Remember Me	Dennis Wilson; Gregg Jakobson	March 3 & early August 1977	Pacific Ocean Blue re-issue (2008)	4:04	Dennis Wilson; John Hanlon; Gregg Jakobson
Love Surrounds Me	Dennis Wilson; Geoffrey Cushing-Murray	January 18, July 16, August 30-September 1, November 13, & December 8, 1978; January 2, 3, 5, 9, 20, 21, & 24, 1979	Pacific Ocean Blue re-issue (2008)	3:40	Dennis Wilson; John Hanlon; Gregg Jakobson
Mexico	Dennis Wilson	May 1, 1978	Pacific Ocean Blue re-issue (2008)	5:13	Dennis Wilson; John Hanlon; Gregg Jakobson
Moonshine	Dennis Wilson; Gregg Jakobson	Unknown	Pacific Ocean Blue (1977)	2:27	Dennis Wilson; Gregg Jakobson
Only with You	Dennis Wilson; Mike Love	September 23, 1976; September 1977	Pacific Ocean Blue re-issue (2008)	3:57	Dennis Wilson; John Hanlon; Gregg Jakobson
Pacific Ocean Blues	Dennis Wilson; Mike Love	February 12, 1975	Pacific Ocean Blue (1977)	2:39	Dennis Wilson; Gregg Jakobson
Rainbows	Dennis Wilson; Stephen Kalinich; Carl Wilson	March 11 & October 6, 1975; March & July 7, 1976	Pacific Ocean Blue (1977)	2:55	Dennis Wilson; Gregg Jakobson
River Song	Dennis Wilson; Carl Wilson	Unknown	Pacific Ocean Blue (1977)	3:44	Dennis Wilson; Gregg Jakobson
School Girl	Dennis Wilson; Gregg Jakobson	August 20, 1976	Pacific Ocean Blue re-issue (2008)	2:31	Dennis Wilson; John Hanlon; Gregg Jakobsen
Sound of Free	Dennis Wilson; Mike Love	November 13, 1970	single release only (1970)	2:19	Unknown
Thoughts of You	Dennis Wilson; Jim Dutch	Unknown	Pacific Ocean Blue (1977)	3:02	Dennis Wilson; Gregg Jakobson
Time	Dennis Wilson; Karen Lamm-Wilson	March 15, 1977	Pacific Ocean Blue (1977)	3:31	Dennis Wilson; Gregg Jakobson
Time For Bed	Dennis Wilson; Gregg Jakobson	October 25–26, 1977	Pacific Ocean Blue re-issue (2008)	3:07	Dennis Wilson; John Hanlon; Gregg Jakobson
Tug Of Love	Dennis Wilson; Gregg Jakobson	March 13, 1977	Pacific Ocean Blue re-issue (2008)	3:44	Dennis Wilson; John Hanlon; Gregg Jakobson
Under The Moonlight	Carli Muñoz	April 27, May 22, May 25, & June 12, 1978	Pacific Ocean Blue re-issue (2008)	3:55	Dennis Wilson; Carli Muñoz
What's Wrong	Dennis Wilson; Gregg Jakobson; Michael Horn	April, 1977	Pacific Ocean Blue (1977)	2:22	Dennis Wilson; Gregg Jakobson
Wild Situation	Dennis Wilson; Gregg Jakobson	1975; October 10, 1977; February 1978	Pacific Ocean Blue re-issue (2008)	2:41	Dennis Wilson; John Hanlon; Gregg Jakobson
You and I	Dennis Wilson; Gregg Jakobson; Karen Lamm-Wilson	August 19 & September 1976	Pacific Ocean Blue (1977)	3:25	Dennis Wilson; Gregg Jakobson
