= Summer Love Songs =

Compilation album by the Beach Boys
- Released: May 19, 2009
- Recorded: 1963–1970
- Genre: Rock, pop
- Label: Capitol
- Producer: The Beach Boys

The Beach Boys chronology
The Original US Singles Collection The Capitol Years 1962–1965 (2008)	Summer Love Songs (2009)	The Smile Sessions (2011)

Professional ratings
Review scores
Source	Rating
Allmusic	4/5 stars

Summer Love Songs is a 2009 compilation of music by the Beach Boys released through Capitol Records. The compilation, as the title suggests, is themed around love songs and contains 20 songs recorded from 1963 to 1970 that fit this theme. Included are new stereo mixes of "Don't Worry Baby", "Why Do Fools Fall in Love" (featuring a never before heard intro), "Hushabye", "I'm So Young", "Good to My Baby" and "Time to Get Alone". Making its CD debut in a revised mix is the song "Fallin' in Love" by Dennis Wilson that was released as the b-side of his "Sound of Free" single in 1970.

The stereo mixes of "Don't Worry Baby" and "Why Do Fools Fall in Love" were made possible by Beach Boys historian Jon Stebbins' discovery of the original multi-track session tapes in the mid-2000s.

== Track listing ==
1. "Don't Worry Baby" (from Shut Down Volume 2, 1964) (Brian Wilson, Roger Christian 1964) – 2:51
2. "Why Do Fools Fall in Love" (from Shut Down Volume 2, 1964) (Morris Levy, Frankie Lymon 1964) – 2:35
3. "Wouldn't It Be Nice" (from Pet Sounds, 1966) (B. Wilson, Tony Asher, Love 1966) – 2:33
4. "God Only Knows" (from Pet Sounds, 1966) (B. Wilson, Asher 1966) – 2:55
5. "Surfer Girl" (from Surfer Girl, 1963) (B. Wilson 1963) – 2:28
6. "California Girls" (from Summer Days (And Summer Nights!!), 1965) (B. Wilson, Love 1965) – 2:47
7. "Please Let Me Wonder" (from The Beach Boys Today!, 1965) (B. Wilson, Love 1965) – 2:52
8. "In the Parkin' Lot" (from Shut Down Volume 2, 1964) (B. Wilson, Love 1964) – 2:04
9. "Your Summer Dream" (from Surfer Girl, 1963) (B. Wilson, Bob Norman 1963) – 2:29
10. "Kiss Me, Baby" (from The Beach Boys Today!, 1965) (B. Wilson, Love 1965) – 2:43
11. "Hushabye" (from All Summer Long, 1964) (Doc Pomus, Mort Shuman 1964) – 2:44
12. "I'm So Young" (from The Beach Boys Today!, 1965) (W.H. Tyrus Jr.1965) – 2:34
13. "Good to My Baby" (from The Beach Boys Today!, 1965) (B. Wilson, Love 1965) – 2:21
14. "Fallin' in Love" (Dennis Wilson 1970) – 3:03
15. "Time to Get Alone" (from 20/20, 1969) (B. Wilson 1969) – 2:56
16. "Our Sweet Love" (from Sunflower, 1970) (B. Wilson, Al Jardine, Carl Wilson 1970) – 2:40
17. "Help Me, Rhonda" (from Summer Days (And Summer Nights!!), 1965) (B. Wilson, Love 1965) – 2:48
18. "Keep an Eye on Summer" (from Shut Down Volume 2, 1964) (B. Wilson, Norman 1964) – 2:23
19. "Don't Talk (Put Your Head on My Shoulder)" (from Pet Sounds, 1966) (B. Wilson, Asher 1966) – 2:58
20. "Girls on the Beach" (from All Summer Long, 1964) (B. Wilson, Love 1964) – 3:01
