= Pacific Ocean Blues (disambiguation) =

Pacific Ocean Blues is a 1977 song by Dennis Wilson.

Pacific Ocean Blues may also refer to:

- Pacific Ocean Blue, a 1977 album by Dennis Wilson
- Pacific Ocean Blues (album), a 2002 album by Gigolo Aunts
