= Rainbows (Dennis Wilson song) =

Song by Dennis Wilson

Song by Dennis Wilson

from the album Pacific Ocean Blue
- Released: 22 August 1977
- Recorded: 1976–1977
- Genre: Soft rock
- Length: 2:47
- Label: Caribou Records
- Songwriters: Dennis Wilson; Carl Wilson; Stephen Kalinich
- Producers: Dennis Wilson; Gregg Jakobson

"Rainbows" is a song written by Dennis Wilson together with his brother Carl Wilson and longtime friend Stephen Kalinich. It was released as the eleventh track on Wilson's 1977 debut solo album Pacific Ocean Blue. The track, as with the rest of the album, was credited as being produced by Wilson and his close friend Gregg Jakobson.

Wilson is quoted saying about the song "'Rainbows' is about being happy and being alive." Fellow song collaborator Kalinich noted "I wrote the lyric first and then Dennis was inspired. Sometimes with others he wrote the music first - most times in fact. I came up with the lines when we were on Sunset in Palisades (in the back yard of his house, one of the old Will Rogers estates). After the initial inspiration he changed the melody somewhat and I had to modify some of the words. Carl also helped on the music..."

The song was one of the earliest songs written for the album, having first been recorded as early as 5 March 1974 at Brother Studios under the early working title "String Bass Song" but with a different arrangement. This version appeared on the The Beach Boys 2026 compilation We Gotta Groove: The Brother Studio Years. New versions were attempted through 1975 and was possibly considered for The Beach Boys' 1976 album 15 Big Ones. Wilson recorded vocals overdubs for the song in the earliest sessions for the Pacific Ocean Blues album with additional overdubs on 7 July 1976.

== In popular culture ==
"Rainbows" was featured in soundtrack of the 2026 film Project Hail Mary.

== Personnel ==
Credits from Craig Slowinski.

- Dennis Wilson – lead vocals (double-tracked), harmony and backing vocals, piano, drums, zither, producer, arrangements
- Carl Wilson – harmony and backing vocals, acoustic rhythm guitar
- Billy Hinsche – harmony and backing vocals
- Ed Tuleja – harmony and backing vocals, banjo, mandolin, acoustic rhythm guitar
- Ricky Fataar – drums
- Chuck Domanico – upright bass
- Jimmie Haskell – string arrangements, orchestral string conductor
- Sid Sharp (leader), William Kurasch, James Getzoff, Joy Lyle, Arnold Belnick, Tibor Zelig, Murray Adler, Nathan Ross, Henry Ferber – violins
- Samuel Boghossian, Harry Hyams, Pamela Goldsmith, Allan Harshman, David Turner – violas
- Jerome Kessler, Jesse Ehrlich, Igor Horoshevsky, Harry Shlutz, Selene Hurford, Raymond Kelley – cellos
- Jimmy Bond, Timothy Barr, Milton Radel, Arni Egilsson – arco double basses

Production staff

- Dennis Wilson – producer
- Gregg Jakobson – producer
- Stephen Moffitt – engineer, mix producer
- Earle Mankey – engineer
- John Hanlon – engineer
