= Lady (Dennis Wilson song) =

Single by Dennis Wilson & Rumbo
- A-side: "Sound of Free"
- Released: December 4, 1970
- Recorded: December 26, 1969 – January 26, 1970
- Studio: Beach Boys Studio, Bel Air
- Genre: Rock
- Length: 2:08
- Label: Stateside
- Songwriter: Dennis Wilson
- Producer: Dennis Wilson

Dennis Wilson singles chronology
"Sound of Free" / "Lady" (1970)	"River Song" / "Farewell My Friend" (1977)

"Lady" is a song written by Dennis Wilson, recorded by him with Daryl Dragon and released under the name "Dennis Wilson & Rumbo" in the United Kingdom on 4 December 1970, on Stateside Records. The song served as the B-side of the "Sound of Free" single. The single was not issued in the United States.

On both songs, Wilson performed the lead vocals with Daryl Dragon playing instruments. Dragon and his wife, Toni Tennille, would later become famous as Captain & Tennille.

== Proposed releases ==
Also known as "Fallin' In Love", the song was reportedly originally written for the unreleased Beach Boys album Add Some Music. That album later evolved into the 1970 release Sunflower, which did not include "Lady". The song has also been rumored to have been considered for the album that became Surf's Up, but again passed over for the eventual release.

Although a fairly obscure song, it was performed by the Beach Boys, as seen on the 25 February 1971 edition of The David Frost Show. When asked what inspired the song, Dennis replied, "My lovely wife, she's an inspiration." Dennis was at the time married to Barbara Charren.

Both songs from the single were part of a legal dispute between Capitol and Brother Records, making both songs out of print for decades. The original mono single mix of "Lady" saw release in 2005 on the Super Furry Animals compiled Under the Influence - A Collection of Musical Influences & Inspirations released in 2005, although this version is thought to be lossy sourced. A remaster of a previously unreleased 1970 stereo mix was included on the 2021 compilation Feel Flows.

A new mix of the song, featuring a newly created introduction (edited together from later parts of the track), extended instrumental passages and additional vocals from both Dennis and Carl Wilson features on the Beach Boys' 2009 compilation album Summer Love Songs. This version was created and mixed by Mark Linett, and is credited to the Beach Boys rather than Dennis Wilson & Rumbo.

A rerecording of the song, titled "Flowers Come in the Spring", was done in 1977. Recorded either during or just after the sessions for what became Pacific Ocean Blue, it was considered for inclusion on his then-unreleased follow-up Bambu.

== Personnel ==
Credits from Craig Slowinski

Dennis Wilson and Rumbo

- Daryl Dragon - piano, bass guitar
- Dennis Wilson - lead vocals, harmonium, Maestro Rhythm King MRK-2 drum machine

Additional musicians

- Michel Colombier - string arrangement
- Alvin Dinkin - viola
- Sam Freed - violin
- David Frisina - violin
- Allan Harstian - viola
- Igor Horoshevsky - cello
- Al Jardine - electric guitars
- Anatol Kaminsky - violin
- Nathan Kaproff - violin
- George Kast - violin
- Marvin Limonick - violin
- Abe Luboff - arco double bass
- Edgar Lustgarten - cello
- Virginia Majewski - viola
- Alexander Murray - violin
- Robert Ostrowsky - viola
- Dorothy Wade - violin
- Carl Wilson - electric & acoustic guitars

== Cover versions ==
A cover version of the song under the title "Fallin' in Love" by American Spring appeared on the B-side of their 1973 single "Shyin' Away". American Spring featured the Honeys members Marilyn Rovell and her sister Diane, without their cousin Ginger Blake. Dennis Wilson's brother, Brian Wilson, was at the time married to Marilyn. The song featured her on lead vocals, as well as a new instrumental and vocal arrangement by Brian Wilson. It was produced by Brian Wilson, Stephen Desper and David Sandler. Although the single sold poorly, it has since become a sought-after collectible. The "Shyin' Away" single was later reissued as a part of the rereleased Spring album by Rhino Records in 1988. Both songs from the single were also released on the 2004 compilation CD, Pet Projects: The Brian Wilson Productions.

English band Lush covered the song as "Fallin' in Love" on their 1991 EP release Black Spring.

In 2000, the song was covered and released as the opening track on the Beach Boys tribute album Caroline Now!: The Songs of Brian Wilson and the Beach Boys. That version was performed by Eugene Kelly.

Swedish pop band Sambassadeur covered "Fallin' in Love" on their 2008 album Migration.

Britta Phillips covered "Fallin' in Love" on her 2016 album Luck or Magic.

In 2020, French pop singer Étienne Daho covered "Falling in Love" on his album Surf.
