= Project Hail Mary (soundtrack) =

Project Hail Mary (Original Motion Picture Score)

Film score by Daniel Pemberton
- Released: March 20, 2026
- Recorded: 2025–2026
- Studios: Abbey Road Studios, London; AIR Studios, London; Rue Boyer Studios, Paris; Les Studios Saint Germain, Paris
- Genre: Film score
- Length: 119:46
- Label: Milan
- Producer: Daniel Pemberton

Daniel Pemberton chronology
The Bad Guys 2 (2025)	Project Hail Mary (2026)	The Drama (2026)

Project Hail Mary (Original Motion Picture Score) is the film score composed by Daniel Pemberton to the 2026 film Project Hail Mary directed by Phil Lord and Christopher Miller and written by Drew Goddard, based on the 2021 novel by Andy Weir, starring Ryan Gosling, Sandra Hüller, James Ortiz and Lionel Boyce. The film score was released by Milan Records on March 20, 2026.

== Development ==
At San Diego Comic-Con, Lord and Miller announced that Daniel Pemberton would compose the music for Project Hail Mary, a departure from Mark Mothersbaugh, the usual score composer on the director duo's previous ventures. Pemberton had previously collaborated with Lord and Miller on Spider-Man: Into the Spider-Verse (2018) and Spider-Man: Across the Spider-Verse (2023), where they had worked as writers and producers.

Pemberton used physical instrumentation and samples rather than synthesizers for much of the score, desiring to make the music sound personal and connect with audiences emotionally despite the film's wide science fiction scope. He utilized "body percussion" by recording clapping and stamping sounds from sixteen people to simulate complex drum machine patterns, employed cristal baschet, ondes martenot and glass harmonica for textural elements. He also included large choral components. Pemberton also recorded a "leaky, squeaky tap" in a friend's house using an iPhone, which was sampled in the score.

== Release ==
The score was released through Milan Records on March 20, 2026. A vinyl edition is scheduled to be released by Mutant in August 2026.

== Reception ==
Zanobard Reviews gave the score an 8/10 rating and wrote, "The wackiness of Daniel Pemberton's Project Hail Mary is matched only by its pure wonder, with both evoked by some delightful instrumental combinations and a compelling "race to save humanity' narrative that overall results in an utterly stellar score." Amy Nicholson of Los Angeles Times wrote that "Daniel Pemberton's score has that same sense of free-ranging curiosity, flitting between genres at will" and noted that it was "distractingly eclectic but vastly preferable to sci-fi scores that just aim to sound". David Rooney of The Hollywood Reporter said that the film is "elevated by the moving solemnity and celestial dimensions of Daniel Pemberton's beautiful score". Nick Hasted of The Arts Desk noted that "Daniel Pemberton's score emphasises both looming threat and camaraderie".

Tim Grierson of Screen International wrote, "Composer Daniel Pemberton utilises soaring orchestras and heavenly choral groups, although he switches gears later during a masterfully tense sequence in which Grace and Rocky execute a daring plan to save their home worlds." Rebekah Bowman of SLUG commended the score, stating, "Daniel Pemberton's ethereal musical score is filled with such majesty that it would be worth the price of an IMAX ticket just to hear it on a great sound system". Odie Henderson of The Boston Globe called it a "stirring score". Gregory Nussen of Screen Rant noted that "Daniel Pemberton's plucky score emphasizes this; the film sounds not unlike old Schoolhouse Rock videos, it is the sound of enjoyment in intellectual discovery."

== Track listing ==
No.	Title	Length
1.	"Ryland Grace, Cognition Assessment"	4:47
2.	"Last Man on Ship"	2:36
3.	"Invalid Operation"	2:20
4.	"Water Based"	1:01
5.	"Humanity"	1:33
6.	"Box in a Box"	4:24
7.	"Top Secret Clearance"	2:35
8.	"You Were Loved (Burial)"	3:53
9.	"Petrova Line"	2:37
10.	"Erratic Maneuver Detected"	3:45
11.	"Cannister Catch"	2:27
12.	"Centrifuge"	2:07
13.	"The Message"	3:33
14.	"Entering the Tunnel"	2:31
15.	"Barrier Language"	2:22
16.	"Anybody Home?"	2:37
17.	"Connection"	4:46
18.	"Clock Numbers"	2:06
19.	"Learning to Communicate"	5:24
20.	"Finding Rocky Voice"	3:02
21.	"Rocky Moves In"	3:46
22.	"Grace Has Mate"	1:12
23.	"God Willing"	1:32
24.	"A Moment"	3:22
25.	"Life Is Reason"	5:30
26.	"Grace Go Home"	4:29
27.	"Three Days"	0:49
28.	"Time Go Fishing"	7:10
29.	"Excessive Centrifugal Force"	1:33
30.	"Rocky Sacrifice"	2:34
31.	"Gravitational Aftermath"	2:31
32.	"Tau Amoeba"	5:29
33.	"Wake Up Buddy"	1:27
34.	"Amaze Amaze Amaze (Fist My Bump)"	3:57
35.	"Goodbye My Friend"	3:24
36.	"Xenonite Contamination"	3:33
37.	"Believe in the Hail Mary"	3:58
38.	"Amaze Amaze Amaze (Life on Erid)"	3:04
Total length:		119:46

=== Extended Original Score ===
This track listing is based on the CD release of the soundtrack. There will also be a vinyl release, which contains fewer tracks from the extended score.

Disc one
No.	Title	Length
1.	"Ryland Grace, Cognition Assessment"	4:47
2.	"Last Man on Ship"	2:36
3.	"Invalid Operation"	2:20
4.	"Newscast"	1:01
5.	"Space Dots"	1:17
6.	"Water Based"	1:01
7.	"Humanity"	1:32
8.	"Box in a Box"	4:23
9.	"Top Secret Clearance"	2:35
10.	"You Were Loved (Memorial)"	3:53
11.	"Prepare for Cut Off"	1:12
12.	"Petrova Line"	2:37
13.	"Erratic Maneuver Detected"	3:54
14.	"Cannister Catch"	2:27
15.	"Centrifuge"	2:07
16.	"The Message"	3:33
17.	"Entering the Tunnel"	2:30
18.	"Barrier Language"	2:22
19.	"Anybody Home?"	2:36
20.	"Connection"	4:46
21.	"Clock Numbers"	2:05
22.	"Learning to Communicate"	5:24
23.	"Finding Rocky Voice"	3:02
24.	"Transporter Demonstration"	3:48
25.	"Messy Room"	1:27

Disc two
No.	Title	Length
1.	"Rocky Moves In"	3:46
2.	"Grace Has Mate"	1:12
3.	"God Willing"	1:32
4.	"A Moment"	3:21
5.	"Life Is Reason"	5:30
6.	"Grace Go Home"	4:28
7.	"Three Days"	0:48
8.	"Time Go Fishing"	7:10
9.	"Excessive Centrifugal Force"	1:32
10.	"Rocky Sacrifice"	2:33
11.	"Measuring Mistake"	1:03
12.	"Three Hours"	1:02
13.	"Gravitational Aftermath"	2:30
14.	"Tau Amoeba"	5:28
15.	"Wake Up Buddy"	1:26
16.	"Amaze Amaze Amaze (Fist My Bump)"	3:56
17.	"Captured"	1:04
18.	"Goodbye My Friend"	3:24
19.	"Second Dream"	1:17
20.	"Xenonite Contamination"	3:33
21.	"Believe in the Hail Mary"	3:57
22.	"Amaze Amaze Amaze (Life on Erid)"	3:04
23.	"Granular Hold" (bonus track)	3:41
24.	"Alternative, Cognition Assessment"	3:01

Disc three
No.	Title	Length
1.	"Sunday Morning Comin' Down" (Kris Kristofferson)	4:31
2.	"Pata Pata" (Miriam Makeba)	3:00
3.	"El Amanecer" (Carlos di Sarli y su Orquesta Típica)	2:27
4.	"Rainbows" (Dennis Wilson)	2:48
5.	"Wind of Change" (Scorpions)	5:12
6.	"Po Atarau" (Turakina Maori Girls' Choir)	0:52
7.	"Gracias a la Vida" (Mercedes Sosa)	4:24
8.	"Stargazer" (Neil Diamond)	2:43
9.	"Glory, Glory" (Ike & Tina Turner)	3:14
10.	"Project Hail Mary (Credits)" (Daniel Pemberton)	2:29
Total length:		170:40

== Additional music ==
Several songs, not written by Pemberton, were featured in the film, but were not in the official soundtrack.

- "Sign of the Times" – Harry Styles (karaoke version sung by Sandra Hüller)
- "Sunday Mornin' Comin' Down" – Kris Kristofferson
- "Rainbows" – Dennis Wilson
- "Pata Pata" – Miriam Makeba
- "The Final Bell" – Bill Conti
- "E Cosi Per Non Morire" – Ornella Vanoni
- "Let's Call the Whole Thing Off" – Ella Fitzgerald
- "Gracias a la vida" – Written by Violeta Parra, performed by Mercedes Sosa.
- "Stargazer" – Neil Diamond
- "Wind of Change" – Scorpions
- "Pō Atarau – Now Is the Hour" – St. Joseph's Māori Girls' College
- "Glory, Glory" – Ike and Tina Turner
- "El amanecer" – Written by Roberto Firpo, performed by Carlos Di Sarli y su Orquesta Tipica
- "Two of Us" – The Beatles

== Personnel ==
The personnel who worked on the score include:

- Music composer and producer: Daniel Pemberton
- Music supervisor: Kier Lehman
- Music editors: Seth Glennie-Smith, Barbara McDermott, Jeanette Surga
- Additional music editor: John Prestage
- Recording and mixing: Sam Okell
- Recording studios: Abbey Road Studios, AIR Studios Lyndhurst Hall, Studio Rue Boyer, Les Studios Saint Germain
- Mixing studio: AIR Studios
- Score orchestrator: Andrew Skeet
- Score editor and pro-tools engineer: Andrew Maxwell
- Pro-tools operators: George Oulton, Jack Mills
- Assistant engineers: Tom Ashpitel, Freddie Light, Eve Morris, Ronan Murphy, Joey Price, Toby Winton
- Additional orchestrations: Edward Farmer, Andy Kyte, Danny Ryan, Cameron Smith
- Music preparation: Jill Streater, Dan Boardman, Global Music Service
- Orchestra: Chamber Orchestra of London
- Orchestra conductor: Edward Farmer
- Cristal baschet, ondes martenot and glass harmonica: Thomas Bloch
- Solo soprano: Grace Davidson
- Body percussion: Wells Cathedral School
- Orchestral choir: London Voices
- Orchestral choir conductor: Ben Parry
- Experimental vocal ensemble: Shards
- Shards conductor: Kieran Brunt
- Electronic instrument design: Alex Gruz
- Orchestral contractors: Garreth Griffiths, James Marangone
- Wells Cathedral School head of pupil excellence: Jayne Obradovic
- Music production consultant: Celeste Chada

== Charts ==
Chart performance for Project Hail Mary (Original Motion Picture Score)
Chart (2026)	Peak position
Australian Albums (ARIA) The Complete Amazon MGM Studios Soundtrack	46
Australian Albums (ARIA)	47
Austrian Albums (Ö3 Austria)	64
Belgian Albums (Ultratop Flanders)	57
Belgian Albums (Ultratop Wallonia)	120
French Classical Albums (SNEP)	9
German Albums (Offizielle Top 100)	55
Japanese Digital Albums (Oricon)	43
Japanese Download Albums (Billboard Japan)	36
Swiss Albums (Schweizer Hitparade)	60
UK Albums Sales (Official Charts)	96
UK Compilation Albums (Official Charts) The Complete Amazon MGM Studios Soundtrack	22
UK Independent Albums (Official Charts)	40
UK Soundtrack Albums (Official Charts)	1
UK Soundtrack Albums (Official Charts) The Complete Amazon MGM Studios Soundtrack	1
US Soundtrack Albums (Billboard)	7
US Top Album Sales (Billboard)	27
