= You and I (Dennis Wilson song) =

Single by Dennis Wilson

from the album Pacific Ocean Blue
- B-side: "Friday Night"
- Released: 1977
- Recorded: 1976–1977
- Genre: Soft rock
- Length: 3:25
- Label: Caribou; Sony Music
- Songwriter(s): Dennis Wilson; Karen Lamm-Wilson; Gregg Jakobson
- Producer(s): Dennis Wilson; Gregg Jakobson

Dennis Wilson singles chronology
"River Song" (1977)	"You and I" (1977)

"You and I" is a song written by Dennis Wilson, his former wife Karen Lamm-Wilson and close friend Gregg Jakobson. It was released as the eighth track on Dennis Wilson's 1977 debut solo album Pacific Ocean Blue. The song was released as a single in the United States, with the B-side being "Friday Night". The single failed to chart. The track, as with the rest of the album, was credited as being produced by Dennis Wilson and his close friend Gregg Jakobson.

According to Dennis the song "is about Karen and myself, that's it."

== Personnel ==
Credits from Craig Slowinski.

- Dennis Wilson - lead, backing, and bass vocals, Fender Rhodes electric pianos, ARP String Ensemble, producer, arrangements
- Karen Lamm-Wilson - backing vocals
- Carl Wilson - backing vocals
- Billy Hinsche - backing vocals
- Ed Carter - acoustic and electric lead/rhythm guitars, bass guitar (uncertain)
- Mort Klanfer - upright bass (uncertain)
- Hal Blaine - güiro w/ sandpaper, kick drum
- Bobby Figueroa - congas
- Steve Douglas or Michael Andreas - flute, alto flute, clarinet
