= Bambu (album) =

Bambu (The Caribou Sessions)

Compilation album by Dennis Wilson
- Released: April 22, 2017
- Recorded: 1977–1979
- Studios: Brother Studios, Santa Monica, CA
- Genres: Rock, pop
- Length: 52:21
- Labels: Caribou, Legacy Recordings
- Producers: Dennis Wilson, Carli Muñoz, Gregg Jakobson

Dennis Wilson chronology
Pacific Ocean Blue (1977)	Bambu (The Caribou Sessions) (2017)

Bambu is an unfinished studio album by American songwriter-musician and Beach Boys co-founder Dennis Wilson and American songwriter-musician Carli Muñoz, intended as the follow-up to his debut Pacific Ocean Blue. In 2008, recordings from the album were compiled as bonus tracks for the first CD issue of Pacific Ocean Blue. In 2017, the same track selection was given a dedicated release, titled Bambu (The Caribou Sessions).

== Background ==
Dennis Wilson began production of Bambu in 1978 at Brother Studios in Santa Monica. He collaborated with then Beach Boys keyboardist and close friend Carli Muñoz as songwriter and producer. The first four songs that were officially recorded for Bambu were Muñoz's compositions: "It's Not Too Late", "Constant Companion", "All Alone", and "Under the Moonlight". The project was initially scuttled by lack of financing and the distractions of simultaneous Beach Boys projects. Bambu was released in 2008 along with the Pacific Ocean Blue reissue. Two songs from the Bambu sessions, "Love Surrounds Me" and "Baby Blue", were lifted for the Beach Boys' 1979 L.A. (Light Album). “Baby Blue” was not included on either the 2008 or 2017 releases of Bambu as most of the song features lead vocals by Carl Wilson.

== Track listing ==
The following pertains to the 2017 vinyl issue, which duplicates a track sequence that first appeared as disc two of Pacific Ocean Blue (30th Anniversary Edition).

Side one
No.	Title	Writer(s)	Length
1.	"Under the Moonlight"	Carli Muñoz	3:55
2.	"It's Not Too Late"	Muñoz	4:22
3.	"School Girl"	Dennis Wilson, Gregg Jakobson	2:22
4.	"Love Remember Me"	Wilson, Jakobson, Stephen Kalinich	4:04

Side two
No.	Title	Writer(s)	Length
1.	"Love Surrounds Me"	Wilson, Geoffrey Cushing-Murray	3:34
2.	"Wild Situation"	Wilson, Jakobson	3:24
3.	"Common"	Wilson	3:30
4.	"Are You Real"	Wilson, Jakobson	3:39

Side three
No.	Title	Writer(s)	Length
1.	"He's a Bum"	Wilson, Jakobson	2:43
2.	"Cocktails"	Wilson, Jakobson, John Hanlon	3:00
3.	"I Love You"	Wilson, Jakobson	2:02
4.	"Constant Companion"	Muñoz, Rags Baker	3:17

Side four
No.	Title	Writer(s)	Length
1.	"Time for Bed"	Wilson, Jakobson	3:04
2.	"Album Tag Song"	Wilson	3:41
3.	"All Alone"	Muñoz	3:41
4.	"Piano Variations on Thoughts of You"	Wilson	2:52
