= The Original US Singles Collection The Capitol Years 1962–1965 =

Box set by The Beach Boys
- Released: 2008
- Recorded: June 10, 2008
- Genres: Pop, surf music
- Length: 153:32
- Label: Capitol
- Producer: Brian Wilson

The Beach Boys chronology
The Warmth of the Sun (2007)	The Original US Singles Collection The Capitol Years 1962–1965 (2008)	Summer Love Songs (2009)

Professional ratings
Review scores
Source	Rating
Allmusic	4.5/5 stars

The Original US Singles Collection The Capitol Years 1962–1965 is a boxset released in 2008 from Capitol, which features the original singles (in mono and stereo) from The Beach Boys from 1962–1965.

It features 66 tracks from their time with Capitol.

== Track listing ==
CD Single 1 – "Surfin' Safari"

1. "Surfin' Safari" – mono
2. "409" – mono
3. "409 (Live)" – mono / previously unreleased

CD Single 2 – "Ten Little Indians"

1. "Ten Little Indians" – mono
2. "County Fair" – mono
3. "Punchline" – mono

CD Single 3 – "Surfin' U.S.A."

1. "Surfin' U.S.A." – mono
2. "Shut Down" – mono
3. "Surfin' USA" – stereo
4. "Shut Down" – stereo

CD Single 4 – "Surfer Girl"

1. "Surfer Girl" – mono
2. "Little Deuce Coupe" – mono
3. "Surfer Girl" – stereo
4. "Little Deuce Coupe" – stereo

CD Single 5 – "Be True to Your School"

1. "Be True to Your School" – mono single
2. "In My Room" – mono single
3. "Be True to Your School" – original mono mix from Little Deuce Coupe
4. "In My Room" – stereo mix from Surfer Girl

CD Single 6 – "Little Saint Nick"

1. "Little Saint Nick" – mono
2. "The Lord's Prayer" – mono
3. "Little Saint Nick" – new stereo mix /previously unreleased
4. "The Lord's Prayer" – stereo

CD Single 7 – "Fun, Fun, Fun"

1. "Fun, Fun, Fun" – mono
2. "Why Do Fools Fall in Love?" – mono single
3. "Fun, Fun, Fun" – stereo
4. "Why Do Fools Fall in Love?" – alternate mono single edit / previously unreleased

CD Single 8 – "I Get Around"

1. "I Get Around" – mono
2. "Don't Worry Baby" – mono
3. "I Get Around" – stereo backing track
4. "Don't Worry Baby" – stereo

CD Single 9 – "When I Grow Up (To Be a Man)"

1. "When I Grow Up (To Be a Man)" – mono
2. "She Knows Me Too Well" – mono
3. "When I Grow Up (To Be a Man)" – new stereo mix / previously unreleased
4. "She Knows Me Too Well" – new stereo mix /previously unreleased

CD EP/Single 10 – Four by The Beach Boys

1. "Wendy" – mono
2. "Don't Back Down" – mono
3. "Little Honda" – mono
4. "Hushabye" – mono
5. "Wendy" – stereo
6. "Don't Back Down" – stereo
7. "Little Honda" – stereo
8. "Hushabye" – stereo

CD Single 11 – "Dance, Dance, Dance"

1. "Dance, Dance, Dance" – mono
2. "The Warmth of the Sun" – mono
3. "Dance, Dance, Dance" – stereo
4. "The Warmth of the Sun" – stereo

CD Single 12 – "The Man with All the Toys"

1. "The Man with All the Toys" – mono
2. "Blue Christmas" – mono
3. "The Man with All the Toys" – stereo
4. "Blue Christmas" – stereo

CD Single 13 – "Do You Wanna Dance?"

1. "Do You Wanna Dance?" – mono
2. "Please Let Me Wonder" – mono
3. "Do You Wanna Dance?" – new stereo Track mix /previously unreleased
4. "Please Let Me Wonder"

CD Single 14 – "Help Me, Rhonda"

1. "Help Me, Rhonda" – mono
2. "Kiss Me, Baby" – mono
3. "Help Me, Rhonda" – mono backing track
4. "Kiss Me, Baby" – stereo

CD Single 15 – "California Girls"

1. "California Girls" – mono
2. "Let Him Run Wild" – mono
3. "California Girls" – stereo
4. "Let Him Run Wild" – stereo

CD Bonus Single

1. "All Dressed Up for School" – previously unreleased original mono mix
2. "I'm So Young" – previously unreleased original mono mix
3. "Graduation Day" – stereo
4. "Help Me, Rhonda" – alternate mono mix
