= The Drama (soundtrack) =

2026 film soundtrack album

The Drama (Original Soundtrack)

Film score by Daniel Pemberton
- Released: April 3, 2026
- Recorded: 2026
- Studios: Abbey Road Studios, London
- Genre: Film score
- Length: 21:01
- Label: A24 Music
- Producer: Daniel Pemberton

Daniel Pemberton chronology
Project Hail Mary (2026)	The Drama (2026)	Masters of the Universe (2026)

The Drama (Original Soundtrack) is the film score to the 2026 film The Drama directed by Kristoffer Borgli starring Zendaya and Robert Pattinson. The film's original score is composed by Daniel Pemberton and released through A24 Music on April 3, 2026, the same day as the film's release.

== Background ==
In January 2026, it was announced that Daniel Pemberton would compose the score for The Drama. Pemberton completed the score for Project Hail Mary and was about to begin work for Masters of the Universe when executives at A24 reached him out and was very keen on him to look for the film. They told him that some collections of the temp music did not suit the edit and asked Pemberton to score for, to which Pemberton denied because of the workload. However, the persistence of the crew members, resulted him to think about their decision and watched an early edit.

As he considered the film to be "intense", he felt that the music should not over do and rely as the question. He felt the problem the team had the existing temp music was telling the audience how to think, and he want to create a score "that was individualistic and recognisable" which he felt it could take a strong musical identity. Pemberton went ahead with a "less is more" approach for scoring the film, as instead of telling whatever events happening, that might disinterest the audience, he wanted the music to make them guess, like the script and performances, so that the audience could be kept on the edge.

Pemberton decided to use a single flute for the film, but then recorded it with three flutes at the Abbey Road Studios. He tried to score it with a slight, uncomfortable tension with most of the pieces that slowly move in and out of time, which was imperceptible but creates a sense of unease and tension.

== Licensed music ==
Music supervisor Jemma Burns curated the pre-recorded soundtrack for The Drama, drawing on folk music, obscure recordings and selections from the 1950s and 1970s to establish a nostalgic, timeless atmosphere. Burns developed an initial playlist after reading Borgli's screenplay and meeting with the director, with several selections from it ultimately appearing in the film. The soundtrack was intended to contrast the romance's old-fashioned whimsy with the increasingly unsettling themes of morality, redemption and forgiveness.

Among the featured songs are Shira Small's "I Want to Lay With You", Jesse Rae's "Inside Out", Nolan Strong & The Diablos' "The Wind", and Alicia Keys' "Try Sleeping with a Broken Heart". Burns explained that the musical choices were designed to juxtapose the film's seemingly innocent romantic atmosphere with its darker narrative developments. The use of "Try Sleeping with a Broken Heart" was particularly deliberate, as Borgli sought a recognisable yet relatively unconventional selection that would contribute to the film's distinctive musical identity.

Burns also highlighted the importance of selecting music that complemented the performances of Zendaya and Pattinson without evoking their previous screen roles. She described the soundtrack as balancing lightheartedness and brutality, with older recordings reinforcing the contrast between an idealised past and contemporary realities. Moondog's "Do Your Thing" was selected for the end credits to provide a warm and whimsical conclusion.

== Release ==
The soundtrack was released through A24 Music on April 3, 2026. It was also released in physical LPs, which additionally included Jesse Rae's "Inside Out" and Katie Fash's "Again". The latter song was previously released as a single, but not included in the album.

== Reception ==
Kate Stables of Sight and Sound called it an "uneasily spare, flute-and-cello soundtrack". Tim Grierson of Screen International called it an "anxious, minimalist score". Matt Maylum of NME called it an "unsettling score". David Ehrlich of IndieWire wrote "Daniel Pemberton's flutey score contributes to the movie's analgesic mood". Pete Hammond of Deadline Hollywood called it "another fine Daniel Pemberton score". Justin Chang of The New Yorker called it "an intensely jangly horror-film score, by Daniel Pemberton, that keeps your nerves suitably off-balance." Larushka Ivan-Zadeh of Time Out called it an "excellent, pins and needles score". Dana Stevens of Slate called it an "unsettling, woodwind-heavy score".

== Track listing ==
No.	Title	Length
1.	"The Drama"	1:11
2.	"The Gossip"	0:58
3.	"The Activist"	2:19
4.	"The Aftertaste"	1:44
5.	"The Deletion"	1:25
6.	"The Kiss"	1:00
7.	"The Book"	2:11
8.	"The Crash"	1:35
9.	"The Impulse"	1:06
10.	"The Conversation"	0:58
11.	"The Cousin"	1:01
12.	"The Betrayal"	2:05
13.	"The Father"	1:27
14.	"The Bathroom"	0:46
15.	"The Exit"	1:15
Total length:		21:01

== Additional music ==
The following songs are featured in the film, but not included in the soundtrack:

- Mackeeper – "Pieces of Yours"
- Sally Oldfield – "Blue Water"
- White Light – "I Want You To Know Me"
- Todd Terje – "Leisure Suit Preben"
- John Carroll Kirby – "Wind"
- Jordan Raf, Ben Leach, Zach Galsky – "Sky Turns Red"
- Shira Small – "Inside Out (Music Video Master Mix)"
- Jesse Rae – "I Want To Lay With You"
- Judee Sill – "The Lamb Ran Away With The Crown (Remastered)"
- Skinny Pimp ft. Lady B – "Boom Dat Shit"
- Nolan Strong & the Diablos – "The Wind"
- Alicia Keys – "Try Sleeping with a Broken Heart"
- Smerz – "You Got Time and I Got Money"
- Juliette Gréco – "Sans Vous Aimer"
- Skinny Pimp – "Skinny Shouts"
- Jackie Gleason – "Tangerine"
- Katie Fash – "Again"
- Sibylle Baier – "Forget About"
- Moondog – "Do Your Thing"

== Accolades ==
Award	Date of ceremony	Category	Nominee(s)	Result	Ref.
World Soundtrack Awards	October 10, 2026	Film Composer of the Year	Daniel Pemberton (Note: Also for The Bad Guys 2 (2025), Masters of the Universe (2026), and Project Hail Mary (2026))	Won	
Hollywood Music in Media Awards	November 18, 2026	Best Original Score – Independent Film	Daniel Pemberton	Pending	
