= Masters of the Universe (2026 soundtrack) =

2026 film soundtrack album

Masters of the Universe (Original Motion Picture Soundtrack)

Soundtrack album by Daniel Pemberton
- Released: June 5, 2026
- Studios: Abbey Road Studios; AIR Studios
- Genre: Film score
- Length: 72:17
- Label: Lakeshore Records
- Producer: Daniel Pemberton

Daniel Pemberton chronology
The Drama (2026)	Masters of the Universe (Original Motion Picture Soundtrack) (2026)	Spider-Man: Beyond the Spider-Verse (2027)

Masters of the Universe (Original Motion Picture Soundtrack) is the soundtrack album to the 2026 film Masters of the Universe directed by Travis Knight which is based on the media franchise by Mattel and the second live-action film adaptation after the 1987 film, starring Nicholas Galitzine as Prince Adam / He-Man. The original score is composed by Daniel Pemberton and features Queen guitarist Brian May, whose theme song "Eternia" was released on May 15, 2026, and the Darkness contributed the title track which was also released as a single on May 22. The soundtrack was released through Lakeshore Records, day-and-date with the film on June 5.

== Background and development ==
Daniel Pemberton was announced to be composing the film score for Masters of the Universe, in his first collaboration with Travis Knight, replacing Knight's frequent collaborator Dario Marianelli. Pemberton who had elected not to score many franchise films or sequels, accepted the offer after Knight told him he could create music inspired by Queen and ABBA.

While recording the score at Abbey Road Studios in London, Pemberton eventually met guitarist Brian May, who was the co-founder of Queen, and discussed the project which led to May being enthusiastic about a collaboration. May performed the guitar portions of the cues, on his famous Red Special electric guitar which Pemberton described as "the equivalent of the Sword of Power from the Master universe because it's an instrument forged in flame" and felt only May could play it. Pemberton and May then collaborated on the three-minute theme song "Eternia" which captures the transformation of He-Man from an average young man to an all-powerful being. The piece further implemented a 100-piece choir, an 80-piece orchestra, rock band and synthesizers. Pemberton stated that he "wanted something that had the weight and seriousness of a hard-rock track mixed with the color, campiness and slight cheese of a poppy Euro song. The influences around [the '80s] were very pop-driven. [he] wanted it to have that sensibility that as soon as you start the movie, it tells you you're in for something fun. That's the most important thing about this film — it's unashamedly fun."

Initially, he wanted to incorporate Shuki Levy and Haim Saban's original theme composed for He-Man and the Masters of the Universe into his main theme for the film, but it did not work out. "The thing that's interesting with He-Man is, for me, the baggage is really the aesthetic. Obviously you have the theme song, which is phenomenally catchy and such an iconic part of people's childhoods, but we tried it elsewhere in the film and it was very difficult to make it work within the action beats of the movie. At its core, that theme is played for 10 seconds at the beginning of every cartoon, it doesn't sustain in the same way for longer." An arrangement of the original television theme does appear towards the end of the film, after Prince Adam settles on "He-Man" as his heroic moniker.

Pemberton composed a "maximalist" score that had more rock and pop sensibility, as the film was sincere, despite the core being ridiculous, which resulted him writing music which was "very flamboyant, theatrical, over the top and quite fun".

== Release ==
Daniel Pemberton served as composer for the film, working together with Queen guitarist Brian May. British rock band the Darkness released the title theme song on May 22. The soundtrack album was released digitally by Lakeshore Records on June 5.

== Reception ==
Jonathan Broxton of Movie Music UK wrote "Masters of the Universe is exactly the sort of score that modern blockbuster filmmaking rarely attempts anymore: unabashedly melodic, gloriously excessive, and utterly committed to entertaining its audience. Daniel Pemberton embraces every colorful, larger-than-life aspect of the He-Man franchise and channels it into two hours of soaring themes, thunderous action music, and rock-infused bravado." Renaldo Matadeen of New Noise Magazine wrote "Pemberton attains a rock 'n roll and industrial balance that's every bit as pristine as it is ambitious this time around."

Zanobard Reviews wrote "Daniel Pemberton channels the sound of the 1980s to amazing effect with his score for Masters of the Universe, with thunderously epic orchestra, Brian May on electric guitar and a killer main theme altogether making for one of the finest soundtracks of the composer's career so far!" James Southall of Movie Wave wrote "Gloriously cheesy yet somehow coming across as entirely sincere, this is such an entertaining score from a composer having something of a banner year, having received such acclaim not long ago for Project Hail Mary (an entirely different beast). It's just rollicking good fun and the lengthy album is a complete blast from start to finish. It's mostly big and bold and as colourful as the album cover would imply, it's as camp as Christmas, it does balance all the big music with occasional interludes of more tender material – there's nothing not to like!"

Anton Smit of Soundtrack World wrote "[Pemberton] is a composer who always delivers a unique and exciting score, and Masters of the Universe is no exception. I have no idea how he comes up with all these innovative ideas, but I am glad his directors give him the freedom to explore them. In my opinion, 2026 is his best year, and yet we are only halfway through!" Filmtracks wrote "The album can be a very tedious experience because of its parody explosions, perhaps the only well-balanced moment of style coming in "Journey to Snake Mountain." A mid-credits cue using a piece of the "She-Ra" cartoon theme is not contained on that product, nor is the end credits version of "Eternia," which was released separately as a single. Some listeners will appreciate the retro groove, but it's too artificial unless you remember that the film is actually a parody."

Frank Scheck of The Hollywood Reporter wrote "Daniel Pemberton's bombastic score [accompanied the film] featuring squealing doses of rock guitar courtesy of Brian May." Eric Diaz of Nerdist News wrote "The score by Daniel Pemberton is also absolutely fantastic. We can't forget to mention that. It just screams the '80s, with all the dramatic guitar riffs. And it does a lot of the heavy lifting when a particular scene is not all that great. It helps that Queen's Brian May contributed a lot to the guitar portions, which just makes it all the better. Also, retro-influenced rock band the Darkness contributes a theme song, simply titled "Masters of the Universe", and it's everything you could want it to be." Clint Worthington of RogerEbert.com wrote "Daniel Pemberton's rock-guitar-heavy score (some of it credited to Queen's Brian May; "Princes of the Universe" even plays over a big climactic battle) keeps the action chugging along."

Kristy Puchko of Mashable wrote "The soundscape is fleshed out with a soundtrack that pulls from the '80s (Queen's "Princes of the Universe") or evocative of it (The Darkness's "Master of the Universe"). Composer Daniel Pemberton's score likewise screams with synthesizers, electric guitars, and hammering drums, calling back to an era of hair metal and stadium rock n' roll. Even Adam outside his He-Man persona has an '80s theme. Reflecting his softer side, The Cure's "Boys Don't Cry" plays over a montage of him failing to fit in on Earth." Amy Nicholson of Los Angeles Times said "Daniel Pemberton's opening theme music is a rousing crescendo of stadium rock synthesizers. You can hear Queen guitarist Brian May in the score — not merely as an influence. It's actually him."

== Track listing ==
All tracks are written by Daniel Pemberton, except where noted.

Track listing
No.	Title	Writer(s)	Length
1.	"Eternia"	Pemberton; Brian May	3:19
2.	"Young Adam"		3:46
3.	"The Battle for Eternos"		4:07
4.	"You Failed"		0:50
5.	"Skeletor and King Randor"		2:19
6.	"Portal to Earth"		2:22
7.	"Boys Don't Cry"	Robert Smith; Lol Tolhurst; Michael Dempsey	1:28
8.	"Comic Store Heist"		2:41
9.	"Freeway Escape"		1:18
10.	"Folding Space (Eternia)"	Pemberton; May	1:36
11.	"Eternos in Ruins"		1:28
12.	"What's Left of Us"		1:06
13.	"Prison Break" (edit)		3:46
14.	"Conflict Territory"		2:27
15.	"The Power of Grayskull"	Pemberton; May	1:54
16.	"He-Man vs Trap-Jaw"		1:49
17.	"Get the Sword"		1:21
18.	"Sky Fight"		5:47
19.	"Mulched"		2:06
20.	"You Are He"		1:14
21.	"See Another Morning"		1:54
22.	"Such Good Friends"		1:35
23.	"Journey to Snake Mountain"		1:34
24.	"Enter Snake Mountain"		1:43
25.	"Fight for Snake Mountain"		3:55
26.	"I Wanted to Protect You"		2:33
27.	"The Universe Shall Quake in My Shadow"		1:30
28.	"Battle Cat and He-Man"		2:23
29.	"The Witch and the Warrior Goddess"		1:27
30.	"Let's Have a Look"		1:15
31.	"The Sword of Power"	Pemberton; May	3:34
32.	"Skeletor vs He-Man"		3:32
33.	"Return to Eternia"	Pemberton; May	3:12
34.	"A Job for He-Man"	Shuki Levy; Haim Saban; Erika Lane	1:51
35.	"Masters of the Universe" (performed by the Darkness)	Justin Hawkins; Dan Hawkins; Pemberton	3:20
Total length:			72:17

== Additional music ==
Included in the film but not in the soundtrack are the songs "What's Up?" by 4 Non Blondes, "The Man" by the Killers, "The Power" by Snap!, and "Princes of the Universe" by Queen.

== Charts ==
Chart performance for Masters of the Universe (Original Motion Picture Soundtrack)
Chart (2026)	Peak position
Japanese Download Albums (Billboard Japan)	75
UK Compilation Albums (Official Charts)	75
UK Soundtrack Albums (Official Charts)	7

== Personnel ==
Credits adapted from liner notes:

- Music composer and producer: Daniel Pemberton
- Music editor: Ben Smithers
- Assistant music editor: Sarah Walsh
- Recording and mixing: Sam Okell
- Guitars: Brian May, Tommy Emmerton, Leo Abrahams
- Drums: Mike Smith
- Bass: Freddy Sheed, Sam Dixon
- Electric cello: Vincent Segal
- Nyckelharpa: Vicki Swan
- Percussion: Paul Clarvis, Rob Farrer
- Choirs: Crouch End Festival Chorus, London Voices
- Orchestra: Chamber Orchestra of London
- Choir conductor: David Temple, Ben Parry
- Orchestra conductor: Andrew Skeet, Edward Farmer
- Supervising orchestrator: Andrew Skeet
- Additional orchestrators: Edward Farmer, Cameron Smith, Andy Kyte, Danny Ryan
- Recorded at: Abbey Road Studios, AIR Studios Lyndhurst Hall
- Mixed at: AIR Studios
- Pro-tools operator and score editor: Andrew Maxwell
- Brian May's engineer: Kris Fredriksson
- Assistant engineers: Neil Dawes, Wil Jones, Eve Morris, Ronan Murphy, Joey Price, Toby Winton
- Orchestral contractors: Gareth Griffiths, James Marangone
- Music production consultant: Celeste Chada
- Electronic instrument design: Alex Gruz
- Music clearances: Christine Bergren
