= River Song (song) =

Single by Dennis Wilson

from the album Pacific Ocean Blue
- B-side: "Farewell My Friend"
- Released: 1977
- Recorded: 1974–March 22, 1977
- Genre: Rock
- Length: 3:44
- Label: Caribou
- Songwriters: Dennis Wilson, Carl Wilson
- Producers: Dennis Wilson, Gregg Jakobson

Dennis Wilson singles chronology
"Sound of Free" (1970)	"River Song" (1977)	"You and I" (1977)

"River Song" is a song written by Dennis Wilson and his younger brother Carl Wilson. It served as the opening track for Dennis Wilson's 1977 debut solo album Pacific Ocean Blue. The song is Wilson's debut solo single after his 1970 collaboration with Daryl Dragon, "Sound of Free". "River Song" was released in Europe with the B-side being "Farewell My Friend". The single however, failed to chart. The track, as with the rest of the album, was credited as being produced by Dennis Wilson and his close friend Gregg Jakobson. Wilson sings the lead vocals on this and every other track on the album.

== Background and recording ==
Wilson composed the music on his own and co-wrote the song's lyrics with his brother Carl. The opening piano part of the song had its origins in the early 1970s, in the song "Ecology", as part of sessions (with then-Beach Boys touring keyboardist Daryl Dragon) for Wilson's first attempt at a solo album, which featured the working titles of Freckles, Poops, and Hubba Hubba. Several tracks from the unfinished album, including "Medley: All Of My Love / Ecology", were released on the 2021 box set Feel Flows.

According to Wilson, the piano riff represents the flowing of a river. In an interview, he explained that he was "in the High Sierras walking by this river that was very small and it kept getting bigger and bigger", and he explained that this is the purpose — to represent the river — of "the guitar sound on the track". The music, according to Wilson, "came from the river".

By 1973, the song had been reworked as "River Song" and was performed live by the Beach Boys, with then-guitarist/bassist Blondie Chaplin on lead vocals and lead guitar. Later in 1973, Wilson composed a bridge for the song. Some live performances, and a rehearsal filmed by KABC-TV were later released on bootlegs. The basic track was recorded around early 1974, and a rough mix from that year circulated on bootlegs, which featured timbales, cowbell, and other additional percussion buried in the final 1977 mix produced by engineer Stephen Moffitt.

The band later included Dennis Wilson's solo version for their 1981 two-disc greatest hits collection, Ten Years of Harmony.

== Reception ==
The Atlantic called the song, "immense: a hair-raising, gospel-boosted thumper, proceeding at a gorgeous orchestral trudge, about the river that runs under us all, under all beauty and under all ugliness, bearing us along and carrying us away. Dennis the surfer, his voice roughened by time and substances, has drifted inland—into the veins of the country."

== Personnel ==
Credits from Craig Slowinski.

- Dennis Wilson – lead vocals, harmony and backing vocals, bass vocals, piano, Minimoog synthesizer
- Carl Wilson – harmony and backing vocals, lead/rhythm guitar
- Billy Hinsche – harmony and backing vocals, bass vocals, lead/rhythm guitar
- Ed Carter – bass
- Ricky Fataar – drums
- Ed Tuleja – bass vocals
- Gregg Jakobson – bass vocals
- The Double Rock Baptist Church Voices of Inspiration Choir – choral vocals
- Alexander Hamilton – bass vocals, choral vocal arrangements, choir conductor
- Jimmie Haskell - string arrangements, orchestral string overdub conductor
- William Kurasch, James Getzoff, Joy Kyle, Arnold Belnick, Tibor Zelig, Murray Adler, Nathan Ross, Henry Ferber – violins
- Harry Hyams, Pamela Goldsmith, Allan Harshman, David Turner – violas
- Igor Horoshevsky, Harry Shlutz, Selene Hurford, Raymond Kelley – cellos
- Jimmy Bond, Timothy Barr, Milton Radel, Arni Egilsson – arco double basses

Production staff

- Dennis Wilson – producer
- Gregg Jakobson – producer
- Stephen Moffitt – engineer, mix producer
- Earle Mankey – engineer
- John Hanlon – engineer
