= Trackdown (film) =

1976 film by Richard T. Heffron

- Promotional poster
- Directed by: Richard T. Heffron
- Screenplay by: Paul Edwards
- Story by: Iván Nagy
- Produced by: Bernard Schwartz
- Starring: James Mitchum; Karen Lamm; Anne Archer; Erik Estrada; Cathy Lee Crosby
- Cinematography: Gene Polito
- Edited by: Anthony DiMarco
- Music by: Charles Bernstein
- Production company: Essaness Pictures
- Distributed by: United Artists
- Release date: March 24, 1976
- Running time: 97 minutes
- Country: United States
- Language: English

Trackdown is a 1976 American crime drama exploitation film directed by Richard T. Heffron and starring James Mitchum and Karen Lamm.

== Plot ==
A rancher's sister runs away from her Montana home for an exciting life in Los Angeles. However, she is abducted and sold into sexual slavery by a gang. Her brother comes to the city to find her, and when the police won't help, he takes the law into his own hands.

== Cast ==
- James Mitchum as Jim Calhoun
- Karen Lamm as Betsy Calhoun
- Anne Archer as Barbara
- Erik Estrada as Chucho
- Cathy Lee Crosby as Lynn Strong
- Vince Cannon as Johnny Dee
- Tony Burton as Zelds

== Reception ==
Kevin Thomas of The Los Angeles Times called it "the best exploitation picture so far this year." Clyde Gilmour of The Toronto Star praised the supporting actors Anne Archer, Vince Cannon, and Cathy Lee Crosby, and pondered whether Mitchum would grow as an actor in the manner of his father Robert Mitchum.

== Soundtrack ==
The film features the song "Runaway Girl" performed by Kenny Rogers.

== DVD release date ==
The film is on DVD by Shout! Factory. It was released on November 12, 2013, as part of Shout's Action Packed Movie Marathon, Vol. 2.
