= The Students =

American doo-wop vocal group

- Origin: Cincinnati, Ohio, United States
- Genres: Doo-wop
- Years active: 1957–1962, 1971, 1983
- Past members: Leroy King; Dorsey Porter; Roy Ford; John Bolden; Richard Johnson; Ralph Byrd: Ricky Kennedy; Frank Stanford

The Students were an American doo-wop vocal group, which formed in Cincinnati, Ohio, United States, in 1957. Although they only released four sides, two of them – "I'm So Young" and "Every Day of the Week" – became doo-wop standards. "I'm So Young" in particular became popular and durable, and has been covered by the Beach Boys, Rosie and the Originals, The Ronettes and Kid Kyle and "The Students".

The Students won the second-place prize at the amateur talent show at the Apollo Theater in New York City in 1956. Their winning song, "Jenny Lee" (composed by “Prez” Tyus, who also wrote “I’m So Young”), was later released as the B-side of a song by the Heartbreakers (which was live at the Apollo, also in 1956) on Fordham Records in 1964.

Both "I'm So Young" and "Every Day of the Week" were written by William H. "Prez" Tyus, Jr., a local Cincinnati high schooler. Tyus wrote the songs and gave them to a local African-American vocal group called the D'Italians. After the group secured a recording contract with Checker Records, they renamed themselves the Students, and it was under this name that Tyus's two songs were recorded.

On May 29, 1961, the Students original of "I'm So Young" on Argo Records, reached No. 26 on the US Billboard R&B chart.

On their recordings, all lead vocal parts were undertaken by Leroy King.

William "Prez" Tyus died On December 23, 2022.

== Members ==
- Leroy King, lead vocals (September 19, 1943 – December 24, 1998)
- Dorsey Porter, first tenor (born January 17, 1942)
- Roy Ford, second tenor
- John Bolden, baritone (October 24, 1941 – April 24, 1982)
- Richard Johnson, bass
- Ralph Byrd, guitar

== Discography ==
On Fordham Records

- 109 "Jenny Lee" (Prez Tyus) (split 45 with the Heartbreakers recording of "Come Back My Love") - 1964 (recorded in 1956)

On Red Top Records

- RT100 "Mommy and Daddy" / "My Heart Is An Open Door" - 1958

On Note Records

- 10012 "I'm So Young" / "Every Day Of The Week" - 1958
- 10013 "Wazoo!!" / "Shuffle Stroll" - Jimmy Coe Orchestra - 1958 (The Students sang backup on Coe's recording of "Wazoo!!")
- 10019 "My Vow To You" / "That's How I Feel" - 1959

On Chess Records

- Checker Records (subsidiary of Chess)
  - 9024 "I'm So Young" / "Every Day Of The Week" - 1958
  - 1004 "My Vow To You" / "That's How I Feel" - 1962
  - 9024 "I'm So Young" / "My Vow To You" - 1973
- Argo Records (another subsidiary of Chess)
  - 5386 "I'm So Young" / "Every Day Of The Week" - 1961
- Cadet Records (another subsidiary of Chess; note: same catalog numbers as Argo)
  - 5386 I'm So Young" / "Every Day Of The Week" - 1964
