= Pacific Ocean Blues =

Song by Dennis Wilson

from the album Pacific Ocean Blue
- Released: August 22, 1977
- Recorded: 1975–1977
- Length: 2:39
- Label: Caribou; Sony Music
- Songwriter(s): Dennis Wilson; Mike Love
- Producer(s): Dennis Wilson; Gregg Jakobson

"Pacific Ocean Blues" is a song written by Dennis Wilson and his cousin Mike Love. It was released as the ninth track on Dennis Wilson's 1977 first solo album Pacific Ocean Blue. The track, as with the rest of the album, was credited as having been produced by Wilson and his close friend Gregg Jakobson.

A backing track was reportedly recorded by late 1975 and was Wilson's only submission for The Beach Boys 1976 album 15 Big Ones, though it was turned down by the band. The completed version, although a hard rocker, features water sound effects. Wilson has been quoted as calling the song "my least favorite cut" on the album as he reportedly felt that the song sounded incomplete.

== Personnel ==
Credits from Craig Slowinski.

- Dennis Wilson - lead vocals, grand piano, Fender Rhodes electric piano (w/ wah-wah), clavinet, Minimoog synthesizers, producer, arrangements, choral vocal arrangements
- Alexander Hamilton - bass vocals (uncertain), choral vocal arrangements, choir conductor
- The Double Rock Baptist Church Voices of Inspiration Choir - choral vocals
- Gregg Jakobson - bass vocals (uncertain)
- Carl Wilson - electric lead/rhythm guitar
- Ed Tuleja - electric lead/rhythm guitar, dobro
- James Jamerson - bass guitar
- Ricky Fataar - drums
