= I'm So Young =

1958 song by the Students

Single by the Students
- B-side: "Every Day of the Week”
- Released: May 1958
- Genre: Doo-wop
- Length: 2:31
- Label: Checker
- Songwriters: William H. "Prez" Tyus, Jr.
- Producer: Jimmy Coe

The Students singles chronology
"I'm So Young" (1958)	"My Vow to You" (1959)

"I'm So Young" is a song written by William H. "Prez" Tyus Jr., of Cincinnati, Ohio. First recorded by the Students, the song has received cover versions by Rosie and the Originals, the Del-Vikings, Benjy Ferree, the Beach Boys, Naomi Wilson, and, as "So Young," by the Ronettes, Antony and the Johnsons, and the Devil Dogs.

While still in high school, Tyus wrote the songs "I'm So Young" and "Every Day of the Week" and gave them to a local African-American vocal group called the D'Italians. Once a recording contract with Checker Records was secured, the group changed its name to the Students, and it was under this name that Tyus's two doo-wop songs were recorded. On May 29, 1961, the Students original of "I'm So Young" on Argo Records, reached No. 26 on the US Billboard R&B chart.

== The Beach Boys version ==
"I'm So Young"

Song by the Beach Boys

from the album The Beach Boys Today!
- Released: March 8, 1965
- Recorded: January 18–19, 1965
- Studio: United Western Recorders, Hollywood
- Genre: Doo-wop
- Length: 2:30
- Label: Capitol
- Songwriters: William H. "Prez" Tyus, Jr.
- Producer: Brian Wilson

The Beach Boys recorded the song for their album The Beach Boys Today!, released in 1965. Its backing track was recorded on January 18, 1965, with vocal overdubs following one day later. An earlier version, recorded on September 9, 1964, was released as a bonus track in a 1990 CD reissue of the album.

=== Personnel ===
Sourced from Musician's Union AFM contract sheets and surviving session audio, documented by Craig Slowinski.

The Beach Boys

- Al Jardine – backing and harmony vocals, electric bass guitar
- Mike Love – backing and harmony vocals
- Brian Wilson – lead vocal, 6-string electric bass guitar, Hammond B3 organ, production, mixing
- Carl Wilson – backing and harmony vocals, electric rhythm/lead guitar (intro only), 12-string rhythm guitar, 6-string electric bass guitar
- Dennis Wilson – backing and harmony vocals, drums

Additional musicians and production staff

- Chuck Britz – engineer
- Ron Swallow – tambourine
