= Pacific Ocean Blue =

1977 studio album by Dennis Wilson

Studio album by Dennis Wilson
- Released: August 22, 1977
- Recorded: 1974 – March 22, 1977
- Studios: Brother Studios, Santa Monica, California
- Genres: Rock; pop; soft rock
- Length: 37:15
- Label: Caribou
- Producers: Dennis Wilson; Gregg Jakobson

Dennis Wilson chronology
Pacific Ocean Blue (1977)	Bambu (The Caribou Sessions) (2017)

Singles from Pacific Ocean Blue
- 1. "River Song" Released: 1977; 2. "You and I" Released: 1977

Pacific Ocean Blue is the only solo studio album by American musician Dennis Wilson, co-founder of the Beach Boys. It was released on August 22, 1977, through Caribou Records. The album was warmly received critically, and noted for outselling the Beach Boys' contemporary efforts. Two singles were issued from the album, "River Song" and "You and I", which did not chart.

The album remains a focal point of Wilson's legacy, being referred to as a "classic". It was voted number 838 in Colin Larkin's All Time Top 1000 Albums. Wilson intended to record a follow-up, entitled Bambu, but the album was left unfinished at the time of his death in December 1983.

== Background and recording ==
After several attempts, starting in 1970, to realize his own project, some of which made it to the finished album, Wilson recorded the bulk of Pacific Ocean Blue in the months spanning the fall of 1976 to the following spring, at the Beach Boys' own Brother Studios. At the time of recording, Dennis' hard living had begun affecting his looks and more importantly his singing voice, which now delivered grainy and rough, yet still deeply soulful, vocals.

Some of the album's songs were originally recorded with the Beach Boys in mind. "River Song" was derived from an earlier recording in collaboration with Daryl Dragon, titled "Ecology". The song was reworked in 1974 in collaboration with Carl Wilson and was performed live at Beach Boys concerts during this period. Final arrangement would not be completed until 1977, including added vocals by The Double Rock Baptist Church Voices of Inspiration Choir. The title track, "Pacific Ocean Blues", was written in collaboration with bandmate Mike Love and was originally intended for the Beach Boys with Love on lead vocal. Wilson also recorded "Rainbows" (co-written with Carl and Stephen Kalinich) and "Holy Man", though the latter was left incomplete.

Recalling the time Wilson spent working on the album, co-producer Gregg Jakobson said, "This was when he fully accepted himself as an artist. Brian had shown him chords on the piano, but as he'd become more proficient the music that came forth was not derivative of that. Having his own studio helped tremendously. With a little encouragement, and the right tools, Dennis took off."

== Reception ==
Professional ratings
Review scores
Source	Rating
AllMusic	4.5/5 stars
Bloomberg L.P.	4/4 stars
PopMatters	8/10 stars
Pitchfork	8.5/10 (reissue)
The A.V. Club	A-
Uncut	5/5 stars
Rolling Stone	4/5 stars
Spin	4/5 stars
MusicHound	3/5

Released in August 1977, Pacific Ocean Blue received mixed reviews upon release, but in subsequent years has been re-evaluated by critics and is now widely praised. It has appeared on "Best-of" lists including Robert Dimery's "1001 Albums You Must Hear Before You Die," and Mojo's "Lost Albums You Must Own" and "70 of the Greatest Albums of the 70s" lists. In 2005, it was ranked No. 18 in GQ's "The 100 Coolest Albums in the World Right Now!" list. He did occasionally perform his solo material on the 1977 Beach Boys tour. Pacific Ocean Blue later developed a status as a cult item. In December 2018, under the name Chewing, Nik Ewing of Local Natives along with Cults, Nico Segal and Pop Etc covered Dennis Wilson's album in its entirety.

At the time of its initial release, the album did not perform well commercially: Despite a significant promotional campaign, the album peaked at No. 96 during a short 12-week Billboard chart run. The disappointing performance of the record, combined with Wilson's increasingly unreliable professional behavior, led his record label to pull support for a modest West Coast tour that had been scheduled to promote the album.

In a 1977 interview, Brian reported that his reaction when Dennis played him early mixes of the album was "Dennis, that's funky! That's funky!" Dennis remembered:

When my record was finished, Brian was the first to hear it. In the middle of some tracks he'd say, "I can't stand this" and walk out of the room. Sometimes he'd laugh. Sometimes he'd cry. I guess he was thinking that he'd seen me grow up as a musician.

In a 2008 interview, Brian said that he had never heard the album. He clarified in his 2016 memoir:

After Dennis died, people used to ask me all the time what I thought about his solo record, Pacific Ocean Blue. I have said that I never heard it, that I won't listen to it, that it’s too many sad memories and too much for me. That’s sort of true, but not really. I know the music on it. I was around for much of the time in the mid-'70s when Dennis was cutting the record. I loved what he was doing. My favorite song that he ever made was ["You and I"]. ... I love that cut. But I haven't ever put the record on and listened through it the way I have with other records, or the way that other people have with that record.

The Beach Boys' Al Jardine retrospectively said of the album:

...I like [Dennis'] music better than some of our stuff. When I listen to his music now it's like, "God, that's better than anything we've ever done." ... [Pacific Ocean Blue]'s strong, original and melodic. Great production.

== Release history ==
Issued by Caribou/CBS Records on CD in 1991, Pacific Ocean Blue went out of print within a year due to ongoing disagreements over copyright ownership; the album was virtually unavailable for more than fifteen years. Before it was reissued in 2008, copies of the extremely rare 1991 CD sold for over $200.

Legacy Recordings released a special 30th anniversary, 2-disc edition of Pacific Ocean Blue on June 17, 2008. It includes material from the Bambu sessions. A limited edition 180-gram vinyl multi-LP box set was also released on the Sundazed label.

Notable on the reissue is the inclusion of the song "Holy Man", recorded for Pacific Ocean Blue in 1977, in two versions. Wilson had completed work on the instrumental backing track but never finished a satisfactory vocal, erasing an original attempt. For the reissue, Taylor Hawkins of the Foo Fighters was recruited to record a vocal version in Wilson's style given their similarities. The song's original lyricist, Gregg Jakobson, was tapped to help recall the song's original melody and to write lyrics for the song. Queen guitarist Brian May and drummer Roger Taylor also recorded backing vocals for the track, along with guitar from May and percussion from Taylor, although their contributions went unused until the version featuring them was released as part of Record Store Day 2019. The version featuring Queen's overdubs in addition to Hawkins' lead vocal is available for digital download and streaming (and was formerly available on a limited-edition 7" 45 RPM single for Record Store Day 2019).

Despite missing the UK Album Chart on its original 1977 release, the expanded reissue of Pacific Ocean Blue entered the UK album chart at No. 16, also reaching No. 5 on the Norway album chart. In addition, the package managed to reach No. 8 on Billboard's Top Pop Catalog Albums chart.

== Track listing ==
Side one
No.	Title	Writer(s)	Length
1.	"River Song"	Dennis Wilson, Carl Wilson	3:44
2.	"What's Wrong"	D. Wilson, Gregg Jakobson, Michael Horn	2:22
3.	"Moonshine"	D. Wilson, Jakobson	2:27
4.	"Friday Night"	D. Wilson, Jakobson	3:09
5.	"Dreamer"	D. Wilson, Jakobson	4:22
6.	"Thoughts of You"	D. Wilson, Jim Dutch	3:02

Side two
No.	Title	Writer(s)	Length
1.	"Time"	D. Wilson, Karen Lamm-Wilson	3:31
2.	"You and I"	D. Wilson, Lamm-Wilson, Jakobson	3:25
3.	"Pacific Ocean Blues"	D. Wilson, Mike Love	2:39
4.	"Farewell My Friend"	D. Wilson	2:26
5.	"Rainbows"	D. Wilson, C. Wilson, Stephen Kalinich	2:55
6.	"End of the Show"	D. Wilson, Jakobson	2:55
Total length:			37:15

=== 30th Anniversary Edition ===
Disc one: Pacific Ocean Blue (bonus tracks)
No.	Title	Writer(s)	Length
13.	"Tug of Love"	D. Wilson, Jakobson	3:44
14.	"Only with You"	D. Wilson, Love	3:57
15.	"Holy Man" (instrumental)	D. Wilson	3:57
16.	"Mexico"	D. Wilson	5:31

Disc two: Bambu (The Caribou Sessions)
No.	Title	Writer(s)	Length
1.	"Under the Moonlight"	Carli Muñoz	3:55
2.	"It's Not Too Late"	Muñoz	4:22
3.	"School Girl"	D. Wilson, Gregg Jakobson	2:31
4.	"Love Remember Me"	D. Wilson, Jakobson, Stephen Kalinich	4:04
5.	"Love Surrounds Me"	D. Wilson, Geoffrey Cushing-Murray	3:40
6.	"Wild Situation"	D. Wilson, Jakobson	2:41
7.	"Common"	D. Wilson	3:34
8.	"Are You Real"	D. Wilson, Jakobson	3:38
9.	"He's a Bum"	D. Wilson, Jakobson	2:50
10.	"Cocktails"	D. Wilson, Jakobson, John Hanlon	3:00
11.	"I Love You"	D. Wilson, Jakobson	2:02
12.	"Constant Companion"	Muñoz, Rags Baker	3:22
13.	"Time for Bed"	D. Wilson, Jakobson	3:07
14.	"Album Tag Song"	D. Wilson	3:45
15.	"All Alone" (previously released on Endless Harmony Soundtrack)	Muñoz	3:44
16.	"Piano Variations on "Thoughts of You""	D. Wilson	3:03
17.	"Holy Man" (Taylor Hawkins version)	D. Wilson, Jakobson, Taylor Hawkins	4:25

== Personnel ==
Credits from Beach Boys sessionographer Craig Slowinski.

- Dennis Wilson – lead and backing vocals, piano, Hammond organ, ARP synthesizer, Moog bass, Minimoog, Clavinet, Fender Rhodes, drums, percussion, bass harmonica, tuba on "Dreamer", violin on "Time", lap steel guitar on "Farewell My Friend", viola and cello on "Tug of Love", arrangements
- Carli Muñoz – harpsichord on "Mexico", percussion, producer
- Carl Wilson – lead guitar, rhythm guitar, backing vocals, co-lead vocals
- Bruce Johnston – backing vocals, vocal arrangement on "End of the Show"
- Hal Blaine – drums on "What's Wrong" and "You and I"
- Joe Chemay – backing vocals
- Chuck Domanico, James Jamerson, Dave Hessler, Wayne Tweed – bass guitar
- Ricky Fataar – drums, tambourine on "Holy Man"
- John Hanlon – Engineer; lead guitar on "Dreamer"
- Gregg Jakobson – producer; backing vocals
- Earle Mankey – guitar, engineer
- Dean Torrence – Background vocals
- Billy Hinsche – Rhythm guitar, backing vocals
- Trisha Roach – backing vocals
- Baron Stewart – backing vocals
- Jim Dutch – backing vocals
- Karen Lamm-Wilson – backing vocals
- Robert Lamm – backing vocals on "What's Wrong"
- Gayle Levant – harp on "End of the Show"
- Stephen Moffitt – chief engineer
- Michael Andreas – alto saxophone, tenor saxophone, baritone saxophone, flute, clarinet
- Lance Buller – trombone, trumpet
- Sterling Smith – ARP synthesizer and Moog Taurus on "Mexico"; "Are You Real" and "Common"
- Tommy Smith – drums on "Common", "Are You Real"
- Dave Hessler – bass on "Common", "Are You Real"
- Ed Carter – lead guitar, rhythm guitar, bass guitar
- Mort Klanfer – bass guitar on "You and I"
- Bobby Figueroa – drums; congas on "You and I"
- Manolo Badrena – percussion
- Janice Hubbard – oboe
- Bill Lamb – trumpet, cornet, trombone
- Charles McCarthy – tenor and baritone saxophone
- Eddie Tuleja – lead guitar, rhythm guitar, slide guitar, banjo, mandolin on "Rainbows"; backing vocals
- Sid Sharp – live strings ensemble
- Alexander Hamilton's Double Rock Baptist Choir
