= Karen Lamm =

American actress (1952–2001)

- Born: Barbara Karen Perk; June 21, 1952; Indianapolis, Indiana, U.S.
- Died: June 29, 2001 (aged 49); Playa del Rey, California, U.S.
- Occupation: Actress
- Years active: 1973–1995
- Spouses: Robert Lamm (m. 1970; div. 1971) Dennis Wilson (m. 1976; div. 1977) (m. 1978; div. 1980)

B. Karen Lamm (née Perk; June 21, 1952 – June 29, 2001) was an American character actress known for her roles in Thunderbolt and Lightfoot (1974), The Unseen (1980) and Trackdown (1976).

She was married to musicians Dennis Wilson and Robert Lamm.

== Life and career ==
Lamm was born in Indianapolis, Indiana. Lamm co-wrote the Beach Boys’ song "Baby Blue" for the L.A. (Light Album) release and was featured as backup vocalist and songwriter on Dennis Wilson's solo album Pacific Ocean Blue. Wilson drowned in 1983 in Marina del Rey, California, and Lamm subsequently contributed to many of his biographies, including the ABC miniseries The Beach Boys Story.

As an actress, Lamm was featured in more than 150 national commercials, TV movies, miniseries, series and films. She appeared in late 1974 in the Columbo episode By Dawn's Early Light and six months after that she co-starred in the Starsky & Hutch pilot-episode.

Lamm appeared as a model on the cover of David Blue's 1975 album Com'n Back for More.

She helped produce miniseries Menendez: A Killing in Beverly Hills and UPN series The Watcher.

Lamm died in June 2001 in Playa del Rey, California, from heart failure.

== Filmography ==
- The Dukes of Hazzard (TV series) (1984)
- The Unseen (1980)
- 240-Robert (TV series) (1979)
- The Power Within (TV movie) (1979)
- Tilt (1979)
- A Last Cry for Help (TV movie) (1979)
- The Hardy Boys/Nancy Drew Mysteries (TV series) (1979)
- Coming Attractions (1978)
- Almost Summer (1978)
- Christmas Miracle in Caufield, U.S.A. (TV movie) (1977)
- It Happened at Lakewood Manor (aka Ants) (TV movie) (1977)
- Police Woman (TV series) (1974–1977)
- The Night They Took Miss Beautiful (TV movie) (1977)
- Trackdown (1976)
- Starsky and Hutch (TV series) (1975)
- The Hatfields and the McCoys (ABC Movie of the Week) (1975)
- Columbo (1974) Episode: "By Dawn's Early Light"
- Thunderbolt and Lightfoot (1974)
- Kojak (TV series) (1974)
- Scarecrow (1973)
- Harry O (TV series) (1973)

Producer

- Menendez: A Killing in Beverly Hills (TV movie) (co-executive producer)
