= Sound of Free =

Single by Dennis Wilson & Rumbo
- B-side: "Lady"
- Released: December 4, 1970
- Genre: Rock
- Length: 2:22
- Label: Stateside
- Songwriter(s): Dennis Wilson, Mike Love
- Producer(s): Dennis Wilson

Dennis Wilson singles chronology
"Sound of Free" (1970)	"River Song" (1977)

"Sound of Free" (alternately known as "Settle Down") is a song performed by American musicians Dennis Wilson and Daryl Dragon (the latter credited as "Rumbo") that was written by Wilson and Mike Love. It was released by Stateside Records as a British-exclusive single on December 4, 1970. The B-side was "Lady". In 2013, "Sound of Free" was officially released on CD for the first time on the Beach Boys' box set Made in California.

Writing in his 1978 biography of the band John Tobler said, "No-one seems to have ever asked Dennis what the idea was behind this burst of independence, but it's possible that there's some connection with the fact that Sunflower, and in fact Surf's Up ... were released in Britain on the Stateside label."

In 2021, a remaster of the song was included on the compilation Feel Flows. A stereo mix was not created because the multitrack tape had been lost.

== Personnel ==
Credits from Craig Slowinski

Dennis Wilson and Rumbo

- Daryl Dragon - piano, Hammond organ, Moog synthesizers
- Dennis Wilson - lead vocals, drums, tambourine, shaker, mark-tree

Additional musicians

- Glenn Ferris - trombone
- Sal Marquez - trumpet
- Roger Neumann - tenor saxophone
- Joe Osborn - bass guitar
- Joel Peskin - baritone saxophone
- Mike Price - trumpet
- Brian Wilson - backing vocals
- Carl Wilson - backing vocals, electric guitars
