= Gregg Jakobson =

American songwriter

- Born: August 2, 1939 (age 86); St. Paul, Minnesota, U.S.
- Occupation: Songwriter
- Years active: 1960s–present

Gregg Jakobson (born August 2, 1939) is an American songwriter who was a friend and songwriting partner of Dennis Wilson of the Beach Boys, and a prosecution witness in the murder trials of members of the Manson Family.

== Beach Boys ==
Jakobson and Wilson wrote "Celebrate the News", "Forever", "Slip on Through" and "San Miguel" for the Beach Boys. The pair also wrote many songs together for Wilson's 1977 album Pacific Ocean Blue including "What's Wrong", "Moonshine", "Friday Night", "Dreamer", and "End of The Show", as well as "Baby Blue" and "You and I" with Karen Lamm. In 2008, Jakobson produced the "Legacy Edition" re-issue of Pacific Ocean Blue, which also features previously unreleased tracks from this album and the unfinished follow-up Bambu.

== Manson ==
Jakobson met Charles Manson in 1968 through Wilson and became friends with him, eventually paying expenses for Manson to record some of his own compositions. He later wrote of his experiences with Manson for Rolling Stone magazine, using the pseudonym of "Lance Fairweather".
