= Carli Muñoz =

Puerto Rican jazz and rock pianist

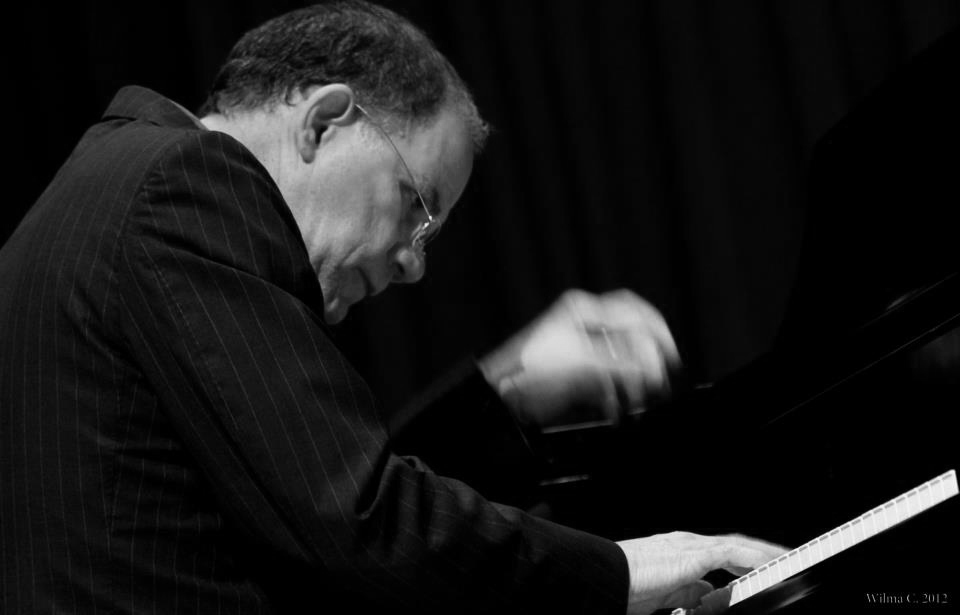
- Carli Muñoz in concert

Background information
- Born: October 16, 1948 (age 77); San Juan, Puerto Rico
- Genres: Jazz, rock
- Instrument: Piano

Carlos C. Muñoz (born October 16, 1948), is a self-taught Puerto Rican jazz and rock pianist, best known for touring with the Beach Boys in the 1970s.

== Biography ==
Although born and raised in San Juan, Puerto Rico, Muñoz' music of choice was jazz.

At age 16, Muñoz travelled to New York City with a rock band he co-founded with Jorge Calderon called The Living End, AKA: Space, which for 18 months served as a house band at a New York club. Muñoz later moved to Los Angeles, where he worked with Wilson Pickett, Jan and Dean, the Association, George Benson, Charles Lloyd, Chico Hamilton, Wayne Henderson, Les McCann, Peter Cetera and Evie Sands.

From 1970 through 1981, Muñoz toured with the Beach Boys, playing Hammond B3 and piano. Following his return to Puerto Rico in 1985, Muñoz stayed out of the spotlight. In December 1998, he opened a restaurant, Carli Cafe Concierto, where he performs jazz music. He often returns to the mainland to perform and record. Within the past five years, Muñoz ventured in painting, writing his memoirs, A Fool’s Journey: To The Beach Boys & Beyond, and poetry by the pseudonym of Carlinius M.
