= Caribou Records =

American record label

- Trade name: Caribou

Caribou Records was an American record label. It was owned by James William Guercio, who also owned Caribou Ranch recording studio and was the longtime manager of the band Chicago.

Caribou was an imprint of CBS Records, now Sony Music; the label was dissolved in March 1983.

== See also ==
- List of record labels
- Caribou Ranch
