= Made in California =

Made in California 1962–2012

Box set by The Beach Boys
- Released: August 27, 2013
- Recorded: 1960–2012
- Genres: Rock, pop, surf rock, psychedelia
- Length: 473:04
- Label: Capitol
- Producers: Alan Boyd, Mark Linett, Dennis Wolfe, The Beach Boys

The Beach Boys chronology
Live – The 50th Anniversary Tour (2013)	Made in California; 1962–2012 (2013)	The Big Beat 1963 (2013)

Made in California (1962–2012) is a compilation box set by the Beach Boys, released on August 27, 2013. The set, released through Capitol Records, was designed by Mark London in a form emulating a high school yearbook. The set contains six CDs with tracks that span the band's entire career, including outtakes, demos, B-sides, rarities, alternate takes and versions, plus over 60 previously unreleased. It supersedes the theretofore career-spanning 1993 box set Good Vibrations: Thirty Years of The Beach Boys, which followed a similar premise.

== Background ==
Originally announced for a 2012 release, alongside the two-disc compilation album Fifty Big Ones, the box set was ultimately delayed. In Spring 2013, an August 27 release date was confirmed, and on June 11, the artwork and track list was revealed.

The story we wanted to tell for the box set was to go as far beyond the stereotype of the Beach Boys as possible. They ended up with multiple and divergent and sometimes incompatible fan bases. It’s a real mind blower to think the same people who crafted this happy sing-along called "Surfin' Safari" also brought us "God Only Knows" and Smile and Surf's Up and Holland and all that type of music. There was an awful lot of talent within that group and each one of the band brought something singular and important to the fabric of the Beach Boys story. We really wanted to impress people with the fact that this band was incredibly versatile.

— Alan Boyd,

Much of the box set features unreleased work by the Wilson brothers Dennis and Carl, which the surviving members were said to have "pushed for." Dennis' song "(Wouldn't It Be Nice to) Live Again" was especially anticipated toward the release of the box set.

In terms of the live tracks, the goal was to present things that were a little bit more unique. We have a version of "Help Me Rhonda" but it features Dennis [Wilson] singing lead instead of Al [Jardine]. We have a live version of "Wild Honey" with Blondie Chaplin singing lead. There are some recordings from the ’68 tour with the band doing "Friends" and Dennis performing "Little Bird". We tried to include deeper tracks with the live material and also deeper tracks all around.
The discs are organized chronologically up until the first half of disc five. The rest of disc five is unreleased live tracks. Disc six is entirely made up of unreleased tracks, acapella tracks, demos, backing tracks etcetera. Rather than sticking the rarities in where they would have been organized in a chronological fashion, I think it makes more sense this way and it plays better as well.

— Mark Linett,

Some previously bootlegged unreleased tracks were left out of the compilation due to the group being uncomfortable with their contents. These included: "Stevie" (a 1981 Brian Wilson composition allegedly written about Stevie Nicks), "My Solution" (a Halloween-themed recording made on October 31, 1970 about a mad scientist), "Carry Me Home" (a Dennis Wilson song containing the lyrics "please God don't take my life"), "Thank Him" (a solo 1963 Brian Wilson demo), and "Walkin'" (a late-1960s Brian Wilson song with an abandoned vocal take). (All of these, except "Stevie", have since been released: "Thank Him" was released on The Big Beat 1963, "Walkin'" was released on I Can Hear Music: The 20/20 Sessions (2018) and Feel Flows (2021), "My Solution" was also included on Feel Flows, and "Carry Me Home" was released on Sail On Sailor - 1972 (2022).

== Promotional contest ==
Professional ratings
Review scores
Source	Rating
Allmusic	4/5 stars
Uncut	8/10 stars

To promote the album, fans were given the opportunity to contribute to the production of a music video for the previously unreleased track "California Feelin'" via Tongal. The same service offered fans the chance to submit a lead guitar track for "Goin' to the Beach", with the winner's performance mixed into the song by Mark Linett and Alan Boyd. The winner was also awarded a custom guitar. A downloadable version of "Goin' to the Beach" was made available on July 22, 2013 as an incentive for pre-ordering the box-set.

== Track listing ==
Original stereo mixes unless otherwise noted. Tracks marked ♦ are exclusive to Made in California. All tracks written by Brian Wilson and Mike Love except where noted.

CD 1 (1961–1965)
No.	Title	Writer(s)	Original release	Length
1.	"Home Recordings/Surfin' Rehearsal Highlights (2012 Edit – Mono) ♦"		Previously unreleased	2:58
2.	"Surfin' (with Session Intro – Mono)"		Previously unreleased	2:27
3.	"Their Hearts Were Full of Spring (Demo – Mono)"	Bobby Troup	Previously unreleased	2:37
4.	"Surfin' Safari (Original Mono Long Version)"		Surfin' Safari	2:17
5.	"409 (Original Mono Long Version)"	B. Wilson, Love, Gary Usher	Surfin' Safari; Little Deuce Coupe	2:09
6.	"Lonely Sea (Original Mono Long Version)♦"	B. Wilson, Usher	Surfin' U.S.A.	2:39
7.	"Surfin' U.S.A."	B. Wilson, Chuck Berry	Surfin' U.S.A.	2:28
8.	"Shut Down (2003 Stereo Mix)"	B. Wilson, Love, Roger Christian	Surfer Girl; Little Deuce Coupe	1:51
9.	"Surfer Girl"	B. Wilson	Surfer Girl	2:28
10.	"Little Deuce Coupe"	B. Wilson, Christian	Surfer Girl; Little Deuce Coupe	1:40
11.	"Catch a Wave"		Surfer Girl	2:09
12.	"Our Car Club"		Surfer Girl; Little Deuce Coupe	2:24
13.	"Surfers Rule (with Session Intro) ♦"		Previously unreleased	2:37
14.	"In My Room"	B. Wilson, Usher	Surfer Girl	2:14
15.	"Back Home ♦"	B. Wilson, Bob Norberg	Previously unreleased	2:22
16.	"Be True to Your School (Mono Single Version)"		Little Deuce Coupe	2:11
17.	"Ballad of Ole' Betsy"	B. Wilson, Christian	Little Deuce Coupe	2:17
18.	"Little Saint Nick (Stereo Single Version)"		Non-album single	2:01
19.	"Fun, Fun, Fun (New Stereo Mix) ♦"		Shut Down Volume 2	2:14
20.	"Little Honda"		All Summer Long	1:53
21.	"Don't Worry Baby (2009 Stereo Mix)"	B. Wilson, Christian	Shut Down Volume 2	2:51
22.	"Why Do Fools Fall in Love (2009 Stereo Mix)"	Morris Levy, Frankie Lymon	Shut Down Volume 2	2:10
23.	"The Warmth of the Sun (New Stereo Mix) ♦"		Shut Down Volume 2	3:04
24.	"I Get Around (with Session Intro – Mono) ♦"		All Summer Long	2:56
25.	"Wendy (2007 Stereo Mix)"		All Summer Long	2:20
26.	"All Summer Long (2007 Stereo Mix)"		All Summer Long	2:10
27.	"Girls on the Beach"		All Summer Long	2:25
28.	"Don't Back Down"		All Summer Long	1:44
29.	"When I Grow Up (To Be a Man) (2012 Stereo Mix)"		The Beach Boys Today!	2:04
30.	"All Dressed Up for School (Mono)"	B. Wilson	Little Deuce Coupe; All Summer Long	2:19
31.	"Please Let Me Wonder (2007 Stereo Mix)"		The Beach Boys Today!	2:51
32.	"Kiss Me, Baby (2000 Stereo Mix)"		The Beach Boys Today!	2:44
33.	"In the Back of My Mind (2012 Stereo Mix)"		The Beach Boys Today!	2:14
34.	"Dance, Dance, Dance (2003 Stereo Mix)"	B. Wilson, Love, Carl Wilson	The Beach Boys Today!	2:03

CD 2 (1965–1967)
No.	Title	Writer(s)	Original release	Length
1.	"Do You Wanna Dance? (2012 Stereo Mix)"	Bobby Freeman	The Beach Boys Today!	2:22
2.	"Help Me, Rhonda (Mono Single Version)"		Summer Days (And Summer Nights!!)	2:48
3.	"California Girls (2002 Stereo Mix)"		Summer Days (And Summer Nights!!)	2:46
4.	"Amusement Parks USA (Early Version) ♦"		Previously unreleased	2:33
5.	"Salt Lake City (2001 Stereo Mix)"		Summer Days (And Summer Nights!!)	2:03
6.	"Let Him Run Wild (2007 Stereo Mix)"		Summer Days (And Summer Nights!!)	2:22
7.	"Graduation Day (Session Excerpt and Master Take, 2012 Mix) ♦"	Joe Sherman, Noel Sherman	Previously unreleased	3:26
8.	"The Little Girl I Once Knew (Mono)"	B. Wilson	Non-album single	2:34
9.	"There's No Other (Like My Baby) (2012 "Unplugged" Mix with Party Session Intro)♦"	Phil Spector, Leroy Bates	Previously unreleased	4:21
10.	"Barbara Ann (2012 Stereo Mix)"	Fred Fassert	Beach Boys' Party!	2:14
11.	"Radio Spot "Wonderful KYA" (Mono)"		Previously unreleased	0:10
12.	"Sloop John B (1996 Stereo Mix)"	trad arr. B. Wilson, Al Jardine	Pet Sounds	3:00
13.	"Wouldn't It Be Nice (2001 Stereo Mix)"	B. Wilson, Love, Tony Asher	Pet Sounds	2:34
14.	"God Only Knows (1996 Stereo Mix)"	B. Wilson, Asher	Pet Sounds	2:56
15.	"I Just Wasn't Made for These Times (1996 Stereo Mix)"	B. Wilson, Asher	Pet Sounds	3:21
16.	"Caroline, No (1996 Stereo Mix)"	B. Wilson, Asher	Pet Sounds	2:20
17.	"Good Vibrations (Mono)"		Smiley Smile	3:37
18.	"Our Prayer (2012 The Smile Sessions Stereo Mix)♦"	B. Wilson	20/20	1:08
19.	"Heroes and Villains: Part 1 (The Smile Sessions Mix – Mono)"	B. Wilson, Van Dyke Parks	The Smile Sessions	3:09
20.	"Heroes and Villains: Part 2 (The Smile Sessions Mix – Mono)"	B. Wilson	The Smile Sessions	4:18
21.	"Vega-Tables (The Smile Sessions Stereo Mix)♦"	B. Wilson, Parks	The Smile Sessions	3:46
22.	"Wind Chimes (The Smile Sessions Stereo Mix)♦"	B. Wilson	The Smile Sessions	3:08
23.	"The Elements: Fire (Mrs. O'Leary's Cow) (The Smile Sessions Mix – Mono)"	B. Wilson	The Smile Sessions	2:39
24.	"Cabin Essence (The Smile Sessions Mix – Mono)"	B. Wilson, Parks	20/20	3:33
25.	"Heroes and Villains (2012 Stereo Mix)"	B. Wilson, Parks	Smiley Smile	3:39
26.	"Wonderful (2012 Stereo Mix)"	B. Wilson, Parks	Smiley Smile	2:22
27.	"Country Air (2012 Stereo Mix)♦"		Wild Honey	2:23
28.	"Wild Honey (2012 Stereo Mix)"		Wild Honey	2:37

CD 3 (1967–1971)
No.	Title	Writer(s)	Original release	Length
1.	"Darlin' (2012 Stereo Mix)"		Wild Honey	2:12
2.	"Let the Wind Blow (2001 Stereo Mix)"		Wild Honey	2:35
3.	"Meant for You (Alternate Version)♦"		Previously unreleased	1:50
4.	"Friends"	B. Wilson, C. Wilson, Dennis Wilson, Jardine	Friends	2:33
5.	"Little Bird"	D. Wilson, Steve Kalinich	Friends	1:59
6.	"Busy Doin' Nothin'"	B. Wilson	Friends	3:06
7.	"Sail Plane Song (2012 Stereo Mix)♦"	B. Wilson	Endless Harmony Soundtrack	2:27
8.	"We're Together Again (2012 Stereo Mix)♦"	Ron Wilson	Classics Selected by Brian Wilson	2:01
9.	"Radio Spot "Murray the K (Mono)"		Previously unreleased	0:11
10.	"Do It Again (2012 Stereo Mix)♦"		20/20	2:21
11.	"Ol' Man River (Vocal Section)"	Jerome Kern, Oscar Hammerstein II	Hawthorne, CA	1:20
12.	"Be with Me"	D. Wilson	20/20	3:09
13.	"I Can Hear Music"	Spector/Jeff Barry/Ellie Greenwich	20/20	2:37
14.	"Time to Get Alone"	B. Wilson	20/20	2:39
15.	"I Went to Sleep"	B. Wilson, C. Wilson	20/20	1:38
16.	"Can't Wait Too Long (A Cappella)"	B. Wilson	Hawthorne, CA	0:51
17.	"Break Away (Alternate Version)"	B. Wilson, Murry Wilson	Hawthorne, CA	3:12
18.	"Celebrate the News"	D. Wilson, Gregg Jakobson	B-side of "Break Away"	3:07
19.	"Cotton Fields (The Cotton Song) (Single Version, 2001 Stereo Mix)"	Huddie Ledbetter	20/20	3:15
20.	"Susie Cincinnati (2012 Mix)♦"	Jardine	15 Big Ones	3:05
21.	"Good Time"	B. Wilson, Jardine	The Beach Boys Love You	2:51
22.	"Slip on Through"	D. Wilson	Sunflower	2:18
23.	"Add Some Music to Your Day"	B. Wilson, Love, Joe Knott	Sunflower	3:34
24.	"This Whole World"	B. Wilson	Sunflower	1:59
25.	"Forever"	D. Wilson, Jakobson	Sunflower	2:44
26.	"It's About Time"	D. Wilson, C. Wilson, Jardine, Bob Burchman	Sunflower	2:57
27.	"Soulful Old Man Sunshine"	B. Wilson, Rick Henn	Endless Harmony Soundtrack	3:28
28.	"Fallin' in Love (2009 Stereo Mix)"	D. Wilson	Non-album single (released by Dennis)	3:02
29.	"Sound of Free (Mono Single Version)"	D. Wilson, Love	Non-album single (released by Dennis)	2:26
30.	"'Til I Die"	B. Wilson	Surf's Up	2:32
31.	"Surf's Up (1971 album version)"	B. Wilson, Parks	Surf's Up	4:12

CD 4 (1971–1979)
No.	Title	Writer(s)	Original release	Length
1.	"Don't Go Near the Water"	Love, Jardine	Surf's Up	2:40
2.	"Disney Girls (1957)"	Bruce Johnston	Surf's Up	4:06
3.	"Feel Flows"	C. Wilson, Jack Rieley	Surf's Up	4:45
4.	"(Wouldn't It Be Nice To) Live Again♦"	D. Wilson, Stan Shapiro	Previously unreleased	4:41
5.	"Marcella"	B. Wilson, Rieley, Tandyn Almer	Carl and the Passions – "So Tough"	3:52
6.	"All This Is That"	Jardine, C. Wilson, Love	Carl and the Passions – "So Tough"	3:59
7.	"Sail On, Sailor"	B. Wilson, Parks, Rieley, Almer, Ray Kennedy	Holland	3:18
8.	"The Trader"	C. Wilson, Rieley	Holland	5:04
9.	"California Saga: California"	Jardine	Holland	3:22
10.	"Rock and Roll Music (2012 Mix w/Extra Verse)♦"	Berry	15 Big Ones	3:10
11.	"It's OK (Alternate Mix)♦"		Previously unreleased	2:11
12.	"Had to Phone Ya"		15 Big Ones	1:46
13.	"Let Us Go on This Way"		The Beach Boys Love You	1:59
14.	"I'll Bet He's Nice"	B. Wilson	The Beach Boys Love You	2:36
15.	"Solar System"	B. Wilson	The Beach Boys Love You	2:49
16.	"The Night Was So Young"	B. Wilson	The Beach Boys Love You	2:16
17.	"It's Over Now (Alternate Mix)♦"	B. Wilson	Previously unreleased	2:45
18.	"Come Go with Me"	Clarence Quick	M.I.U. Album	2:08
19.	"California Feelin'♦"	B. Wilson, Kalinich	Classics Selected by Brian Wilson	2:54
20.	"Brian's Back (Alternate Mix)♦"	Love	Previously unreleased	2:56
21.	"Good Timin'"	B. Wilson, C. Wilson	L.A. (Light Album)	2:14
22.	"Angel Come Home"	C. Wilson, Geoffrey Cushing-Murray	L.A. (Light Album)	3:39
23.	"Baby Blue"	D. Wilson, Jakobson, Karen Lamm	L.A. (Light Album)	3:23
24.	"It's a Beautiful Day (Single Edit) (2012 Mix)♦"	Jardine, Love	Non-album single Americathon; Ten Years of Harmony	3:29
25.	"Goin' to the Beach♦"	Love	Previously unreleased	2:23

CD 5 (1980–2012)
No.	Title	Writer(s)	Original release	Length
1.	"Goin' On"		Keepin' the Summer Alive	3:02
2.	"Why Don't They Let Us Fall in Love♦"	Spector, Barry, Greenwich	Previously unreleased	3:15
3.	"Da Doo Ron Ron♦"	Spector, Barry, Greenwich	Previously unreleased	1:53
4.	"Getcha Back"	Love, Terry Melcher	The Beach Boys	3:00
5.	"California Dreamin'"	John Phillips, Michelle Phillips	Made in U.S.A.	3:24
6.	"Kokomo"	Love, Phillips, Melcher, Scott McKenzie	Cocktail; Still Cruisin'	3:38
7.	"Soul Searchin'♦"	B. Wilson, Andy Paley	Previously unreleased	3:59
8.	"You're Still a Mystery♦"	B. Wilson, Paley	Previously unreleased	3:20
9.	"That's Why God Made The Radio"	B. Wilson, Joe Thomas, Larry Millas, Jim Peterik	That's Why God Made the Radio	3:19
10.	"Isn't It Time (Single Version)"	B. Wilson, Love, Thomas, Millas, Peterik	That's Why God Made the Radio	3:44

The Beach Boys Live (All tracks previously unreleased)
No.	Title	Writer(s)	Length
11.	"Runaway (Chicago 1965, with Concert Promo Intro – Mono)♦"	Del Shannon, Max Crook	2:53
12.	"You're So Good to Me (Paris 1966 – Mono) ♦"		2:16
13.	"The Letter (Hawaii Rehearsal 1967) ♦"	Wayne Carson Thompson	1:55
14.	"Friends (Chicago 1968 – Mono) ♦"	B. Wilson, C. Wilson, D. Wilson, Jardine	2:45
15.	"Little Bird (Chicago 1968 – Mono) ♦"	D. Wilson, Kalinich	1:57
16.	"All I Want to Do (London 1968) ♦"	D. Wilson, Kalinich	2:04
17.	"Help Me, Rhonda (New Jersey 1972) ♦"		4:14
18.	"Wild Honey (New Jersey 1972) ♦"		4:47
19.	"Only with You (New York 1972) ♦"	D. Wilson, Love	4:29
20.	"It's About Time (Chicago 1973) ♦"	D. Wilson, C. Wilson, Jardine, Burchman	3:38
21.	"I Can Hear Music (Maryland 1975) ♦"	Spector, Barry, Greenwich	3:05
22.	"Vegetables (New York 1993) ♦"	B. Wilson, Parks	2:22
23.	"Wonderful (New York 1993) ♦"	B. Wilson, Parks	2:21
24.	"Sail On, Sailor (Louisville 1995) ♦"	B. Wilson, Parks, Rieley, Almer, Kennedy	3:14
25.	"Summer in Paradise (London 1993) ♦"	Love, Melcher, Craig Fall	4:25

CD 6 (From the Vaults) (All tracks previously unreleased except "SMiLE Backing Vocals Montage")
No.	Title	Writer(s)	Length
1.	"Radio Spot (1966—Mono)♦"		0:12
2.	"Slip on Through (A Cappella Mix)♦"	D. Wilson	2:32
3.	"Don't Worry Baby (Stereo Session Outtake w/ Alternate Lead Vocal)♦"	B. Wilson, Christian	3:07
4.	"Pom Pom Play Girl (Vocal Session Highlight)♦"	B. Wilson, Usher	2:46
5.	"Guess I'm Dumb (Instrumental Track w/Background Vocals)♦"	B. Wilson, Russ Titelman	2:55
6.	"Sherry She Needs Me (1965 Track w/1976 Vocal)♦"	B. Wilson, Titelman	2:53
7.	"Mona Kana (Instrumental Track)♦"	D. Wilson	2:57
8.	"This Whole World (A Cappella)♦"	B. Wilson	1:59
9.	"Where Is She?♦"	B. Wilson	2:51
10.	"Had to Phone Ya (Instrumental Track)♦"	B. Wilson	1:50
11.	"SMiLE Backing Vocals Montage (from The Smile Sessions)"	B. Wilson	8:31
12.	"Good Vibrations (Stereo Track Sections)♦"	B. Wilson	3:50
13.	"Be with Me (Demo)♦"	D. Wilson	2:47
14.	"I Believe in Miracles (Vocal Section)♦"		0:21
15.	"Why (Instrumental Track)♦"	B. Wilson	2:10
16.	"Barnyard Blues♦"	D. Wilson	2:33
17.	"Don't Go Near the Water (Instrumental Track)♦"	Love, Jardine	2:46
18.	"You've Lost That Lovin' Feelin'♦"	Spector, Barry Mann, Cynthia Weil	3:55
19.	"Transcendental Meditation (Instrumental Track)♦"	B. Wilson, Jardine	1:51
20.	"Our Sweet Love (Vocals w/Strings)♦"	B. Wilson, C. Wilson, Jardine	2:39
21.	"Back Home (1970 Version)♦"	B. Wilson, Norberg	2:22
22.	"California Feelin' (Original Demo)♦"	B. Wilson, Kalinich	2:14
23.	"California Girls ("Lei'd in Hawaii" Studio Version)♦"		2:29
24.	"Help You, Rhonda ("Lei'd in Hawaii" Studio Version)♦"		2:25
25.	"Surf's Up (1967 Version, 2012 mix)♦"	B. Wilson, Parks	3:48
26.	"My Love Lives On♦"	D. Wilson, S. Kalinich	2:33
27.	"Radio Spot 1964 – Mono♦"		0:15
28.	"Wendy (BBC—Live in the Studio 1964 – Mono)♦"		2:14
29.	"When I Grow Up (To Be a Man) (BBC—Live in the Studio 1964 – Mono)♦"		2:03
30.	"Hushabye (BBC—Live in the Studio 1964 – Mono)♦"	Doc Pomus, Mort Shuman	2:40
31.	"Carl Wilson: Coda (2013 Edit)"		1:25
