= 1967 – Sunshine Tomorrow =

Compilation album by the Beach Boys
- Released: June 30, 2017
- Recorded: June 1967 – 1970
- Genre: Soul; R&B
- Label: Capitol
- Producer: The Beach Boys (original recordings)
- Compiler: Mark Linett; Alan Boyd

The Beach Boys chronology
Graduation Day 1966 (2016)	1967 – Sunshine Tomorrow (2017)	The Beach Boys with the Royal Philharmonic Orchestra (2018)

1967 – Sunshine Tomorrow is an expanded reissue of the 1967 album Wild Honey by American rock band the Beach Boys. It was released by Capitol Records on June 30, 2017, and consists largely of previously unreleased material that the group had produced after abandoning Smile in mid-1967. Included is the first ever complete stereo mix of Wild Honey, live performances, outtakes, session highlights, and additional material sourced from Smiley Smile (1967) and the unreleased live effort Lei'd in Hawaii, both of which immediately preceded the Wild Honey sessions.

On December 8, 2017, the reissue was followed with two digital-exclusive compilations: 1967 – Sunshine Tomorrow 2: The Studio Sessions and 1967 – Live Sunshine. They include more than 100 tracks that had been left off the original release. In 2018, the set was followed with Wake the World: The Friends Sessions.

== Background ==
The album, which focuses on the Beach Boys' post-Smile 1967 recordings, includes a new stereo mix of Wild Honey produced by compilers Mark Linett and Alan Boyd. The mix was also made available as a separate vinyl release. The title derives from the Wild Honey track "Let the Wind Blow", which contains the couplet "take away their sorrows, give them sunshine tomorrow."

== Critical reception ==
Professional ratings
Aggregate scores
Source	Rating
Metacritic	80/100
Review scores
Source	Rating
AllMusic	4/5 stars
The Independent	3/5 stars
Paste	7.7/10
Pitchfork	8.1/10
The Spill Magazine	5/5 stars
Uncut	8/10

AllMusic critic Stephen Thomas Erlewine wrote that the album "feels like a gift: it bolsters the argument that the period following Pet Sounds and Smile was no less creative than that golden age. ... Wild Honey appropriately takes center stage on this project, with a vivid new stereo mix." Pitchfork's said that it "finds them firing in all creative directions at once for a brief, beautiful moment just as their wave started to recede. ... the magic of Sunshine Tomorrow is that the Beach Boys are all of these at once: chaotic and relaxed, naive and sophisticated, pop-oriented and intimate. Brian is both present and slipping away." Music journalist Tim Sommer believed the new stereo mix transformed Wild Honey from a "flat and peculiar ... afterthought of Smiley Smile" to a "deep and delightful, human, rollicking, humming and rolling [album]."

Paste's Robert Ham surmised that the "objective, it seems, is to inspire a collective reappraisal of a period in the band’s career when they were still respected critically and beloved commercially, but struggling creatively ... 1967 succeeds in that humble goal but just barely." Steve Marinucci from AXS characterized the original albums as "confusing", and that "there's little here to recommend to casual listeners, though certainly Beach Boys diehards will be attracted to it."

== Track listing ==
=== Disc one ===
Wild Honey stereo mix
No.	Title	Writer(s)	Length
1.	"Wild Honey"	Brian Wilson; Mike Love	2:45
2.	"Aren't You Glad"	B. Wilson; Love	2:16
3.	"I Was Made to Love Her"	Henry Cosby; Sylvia Moy; Lula Mae Hardaway; Stevie Wonder	2:07
4.	"Country Air"	B. Wilson; Love	2:21
5.	"A Thing or Two"	B. Wilson; Love	2:42
6.	"Darlin'"	B. Wilson; Love	2:14
7.	"I'd Love Just Once to See You"	B. Wilson; Love	1:49
8.	"Here Comes the Night"	B. Wilson; Love	2:44
9.	"Let the Wind Blow"	B. Wilson; Love	2:23
10.	"How She Boogalooed It"	Love; Bruce Johnston; Al Jardine; Carl Wilson	1:59
11.	"Mama Says" (original mono mix)	B. Wilson; Love	1:08
Total length:			24:28

All subsequent tracks were previously unreleased.

Wild Honey sessions: September – November 1967
No.	Title	Writer(s)	Length
12.	"Lonely Days" (alternate version)	unknown	1:45
13.	"Cool Cool Water" (alternate early version)	B. Wilson; Love	2:08
14.	"Time to Get Alone" (alternate early version)	B. Wilson	3:08
15.	"Can't Wait Too Long" (alternate early version)	B. Wilson	2:49
16.	"I'd Love Just Once to See You" (alternate version)	B. Wilson; Love	2:22
17.	"I Was Made to Love Her" (vocal insert session)	Cosby; Moy; Hardaway; Wonder	1:35
18.	"I Was Made to Love Her" (long version)	Cosby; Moy; Hardaway; Wonder	2:35
19.	"Hide Go Seek"	B. Wilson	0:51
20.	"Honey Get Home"	B. Wilson	1:22
21.	"Wild Honey" (session highlights)	B. Wilson; Love	5:39
22.	"Aren't You Glad" (session highlights)	B. Wilson; Love	4:21
23.	"A Thing Or Two" (track and backing vocals)	B. Wilson; Love	1:01
24.	"Darlin'" (session highlights)	B. Wilson; Love	4:36
25.	"Let the Wind Blow" (session highlights)	B. Wilson; Love	4:14
Total length:			38:26

Wild Honey live: 1967 – 1970
No.	Title	Writer(s)	Length
26.	"Wild Honey" (live in Detroit, November 17, 1967)	B. Wilson; Love	2:53
27.	"Country Air" (live in Detroit, November 17, 1967)	B. Wilson; Love	2:20
28.	"Darlin'" (live in Pittsburgh, November 22, 1967)	B. Wilson; Love	2:25
29.	"How She Boogalooed It" (live in Detroit, November 17, 1967)	Love; Johnston; Jardine; C. Wilson	2:43
30.	"Aren't You Glad" (live at the Big Sur Folk Festival, October 3, 1970)	B. Wilson; Love	3:12
31.	"Mama Says" (session highlights)	B. Wilson; Love	3:08
Total length:			16:41

=== Disc two ===
Smiley Smile sessions: June – July 1967
No.	Title	Writer(s)	Length
1.	"Heroes and Villains" (single version backing track)	Wilson; Van Dyke Parks	3:38
2.	"Vegetables" (long version)	Wilson; Parks	2:55
3.	"Fall Breaks and Back to Winter" (alternate mix)	Wilson	2:28
4.	"Wind Chimes" (alternate tag section)	Wilson	0:48
5.	"Wonderful" (backing track)	Wilson	2:23
6.	"With Me Tonight" (alternate version with session intro)	Wilson	0:51
7.	"Little Pad" (backing track)	Wilson	2:40
8.	"All Day All Night (Whistle In)" (alternate version 1)	Wilson	1:04
9.	"All Day All Night (Whistle In)" (alternate version 2)	Wilson	0:50
10.	"Untitled" (Redwood)		0:35
Total length:			18:12

Lei'd in Hawaii "live" album: September 1967
No.	Title	Writer(s)	Length
11.	"Fred Vail Intro"		0:24
12.	"The Letter"	Wayne Carson	1:54
13.	"You're So Good to Me"	Wilson; Love	2:31
14.	"Help Me, Rhonda"	Wilson; Love	2:24
15.	"California Girls"	Wilson; Love	2:30
16.	"Surfer Girl"	Wilson	2:17
17.	"Sloop John B"	traditional	2:50
18.	"With a Little Help from My Friends"	Lennon–McCartney	2:21
19.	"Their Hearts Were Full of Spring"	Bobby Troup	2:33
20.	"God Only Knows"	Wilson; Tony Asher	2:45
21.	"Good Vibrations"	Wilson; Love	4:13
22.	"Game of Love"	Clint Ballard Jr.	2:11
23.	"The Letter" (alternate take)	Carson	1:56
24.	"With a Little Help from My Friends" (stereo mix)	Lennon–McCartney	2:21
Total length:			33:10

Live in Hawaii: August 1967
No.	Title	Writer(s)	Length
25.	"Hawthorne Boulevard"	Wilson	1:05
26.	"Surfin'"	Wilson; Love	1:40
27.	"Gettin' Hungry"	Wilson; Love	3:19
28.	"Hawaii" (rehearsal take)	Wilson; Love	1:11
29.	"Heroes and Villains" (rehearsal)	Wilson; Parks	4:45
Total length:			12:00

Thanksgiving tour 1967: Live in Washington, D.C., and Boston
No.	Title	Writer(s)	Length
30.	"California Girls" (Washington, DC, November 19, 1967)	Wilson; Love	2:32
31.	"Graduation Day" (Washington, DC, November 19, 1967)	Joe Sherman; Noel Sherman	2:56
32.	"I Get Around" (Boston, November 23, 1967)	Wilson; Love	2:53
Total length:			8:21

Additional 1967 studio recordings
No.	Title	Writer(s)	Length
33.	"Surf’s Up" (1967 version)	Wilson; Parks	5:25
34.	"Surfer Girl" (1967 a cappella mix)	Wilson	2:17
Total length:			7:42

=== Sequels ===
These two companion albums were issued on December 8, 2017, as digital exclusives.

==== 1967 – Sunshine Tomorrow 2: The Studio Sessions ====
Sunshine Tomorrow 2 album cover

No.	Title	Length
1.	"Heroes And Villains – A Cappella"	3:38
2.	"Vegetables – Track And Background Vocals"	2:24
3.	"She's Going Bald – Track And Background Vocals"	2:15
4.	"Little Pad – A Cappella"	2:18
5.	"With Me Tonight – Session Highlight"	3:12
6.	"Wind Chimes – Track And Background Vocals"	2:40
7.	"Gettin' Hungry – Track And Background Vocals"	2:32
8.	"Whistle In – Track And Background Vocals"	1:19
9.	"Aren't You Glad – Stereo Single Mix"	2:16
10.	"I Was Made To Love Her – Track And Background Vocals"	1:21
11.	"Country Air – Track And Background Vocals"	2:29
12.	"Darlin' – Track And Background Vocals"	2:14
13.	"I'd Love Just Once To See You – Track And Background Vocals"	2:34
14.	"Here Comes The Night – A Cappella"	2:35
15.	"Let The Wind Blow – A Cappella"	2:26
16.	"How She Boogalooed It – Track And Stereo Last Verse"	3:22
17.	"Lonely Days – Session Highlight And Track"	3:14
18.	"Time To Get Alone – Backing Track"	3:15
19.	"Cool Cool Water – Alternate Mix"	2:10
20.	"Can't Wait Too Long – Alternative Mix With Tag"	2:38
21.	"Tune L – Session – Unreleased"	3:44
22.	"Good News – Outtake"	1:12
23.	"Surfin' – "Lei'd In Hawaii" / Studio Backing Track"	1:26
24.	"Heroes And Villains – "Lei'd In Hawaii" / Studio Version"	2:45
25.	"With A Little Help From My Friends – Session Highlight And Track With Background Vocals"	3:19
26.	"Barbara Ann – "Lei'd In Hawaii" / Studio Backing Track"	1:56
27.	"California Girls – "Lei'd In Hawaii" / Studio Stereo Mix"	2:38
28.	"God Only Knows – "Lei'd In Hawaii" / Studio Stereo Mix"	2:45
29.	"Surfer Girl – "Lei'd In Hawaii" / Studio Stereo Mix – Alternate Take"	2:46

==== 1967 – Live Sunshine ====
Live Sunshine album cover

Live in Hawaii – 8/25/67
No.	Title	Length
1.	"Heroes And Villains – Rehearsal"	5:20
2.	"God Only Knows – Rehearsal"	2:32
3.	"Good Vibrations – Rehearsal"	8:27
4.	"The Letter – Rehearsal"	3:02
5.	"You're So Good To Me – Rehearsal"	3:42
6.	"Hawaii – Rehearsal"	1:23
7.	"All Day All Night – Rehearsal"	2:43
8.	"California Girls – Rehearsal Take 1"	2:39
9.	"Surfin' – Rehearsal"	5:10
10.	"Sloop John B – Rehearsal"	3:20
11.	"Wouldn't It Be Nice – Rehearsal"	3:32
12.	"California Girls – Rehearsal Take 2"	3:49
13.	"The Letter"	2:36
14.	"Hawaii"	1:06
15.	"You're So Good To Me"	1:46
16.	"Surfer Girl"	3:05
17.	"Surfin'"	2:33
18.	"Gettin' Hungry"	3:11
19.	"Sloop John B"	3:23
20.	"California Girls"	2:37
21.	"Wouldn't It Be Nice"	2:13
22.	"Heroes And Villains"	3:49
23.	"God Only Knows"	3:28
24.	"Good Vibrations"	4:49
25.	"Barbara Ann"	2:45

Live in Hawaii – 8/26/67
No.	Title	Length
26.	"The Letter – Rehearsal"	8:36
27.	"Hawaii – Rehearsal [new edit & mix]"	2:29
28.	"You're So Good To Me – Rehearsal"	2:44
29.	"God Only Knows – Rehearsal"	0:49
30.	"Help Me, Rhonda – Rehearsal"	3:42
31.	"California Girls – Rehearsal"	2:22
32.	"Good Vibrations – Rehearsal"	4:34
33.	"Heroes And Villains – Rehearsal [new edit & mix]"	5:09
34.	"Their Hearts Were Full Of Spring – Rehearsal"	8:18
35.	"The Lord's Prayer – Rehearsal"	7:58
36.	"Hawthorne Boulevard – Instrumental"	1:11
37.	"Hawaii"	1:23
38.	"You're So Good To Me"	2:06
39.	"Help Me, Rhonda"	2:33
40.	"California Girls"	2:34
41.	"Wouldn't It Be Nice"	2:13
42.	"Gettin' Hungry [new edit & mix]"	2:40
43.	"Surfer Girl"	3:06
44.	"Surfin' [new edit & mix]"	2:00
45.	"Sloop John B"	3:02
46.	"The Letter [new edit & mix]"	2:20
47.	"God Only Knows"	2:56
48.	"Good Vibrations"	4:53
49.	"Heroes And Villains"	4:45
50.	"Barbara Ann"	2:35

Live in Detroit – 11/17/67
No.	Title	Length
51.	"Barbara Ann"	3:06
52.	"Darlin'"	2:54
53.	"Country Air"	2:37
54.	"I Get Around"	2:38
55.	"How She Boogalooed It"	2:45
56.	"Wouldn't It Be Nice"	2:29
57.	"God Only Knows"	3:15
58.	"California Girls"	3:53
59.	"Wild Honey"	2:52
60.	"Graduation Day"	2:53
61.	"Good Vibrations"	4:25
62.	"Johnny B. Goode"	3:15

Live in Washington, D.C. – 11/19/67
No.	Title	Length
63.	"Barbara Ann"	3:34
64.	"Darlin'"	2:47
65.	"I Get Around"	2:52
66.	"Surfer Girl"	2:59
67.	"Wouldn't It Be Nice"	2:47
68.	"God Only Knows"	3:08
69.	"California Girls"	2:40
70.	"Wild Honey"	4:00
71.	"Good Vibrations"	4:24
72.	"Graduation Day"	3:19
73.	"Johnny B. Goode"	4:28

Live in White Plains, NY – 11/21/67
No.	Title	Length
74.	"Help Me, Rhonda"	2:19
75.	"Barbara Ann"	2:07
76.	"Darlin'"	2:54
77.	"Surfer Girl"	2:28
78.	"Wouldn't It Be Nice"	2:17
79.	"God Only Knows"	2:39
80.	"California Girls"	2:29
81.	"Wild Honey"	2:53
82.	"Graduation Day"	3:03
83.	"Good Vibrations"	4:18

Live in Pittsburgh – 11/22/67
No.	Title	Length
84.	"Help Me, Rhonda"	2:18
85.	"Barbara Ann"	2:05
86.	"I Get Around"	2:19
87.	"Darlin'"	2:51
88.	"Surfer Girl"	2:48
89.	"Wouldn't It Be Nice"	2:39
90.	"God Only Knows"	2:47
91.	"California Girls"	2:30
92.	"Wild Honey"	4:01
93.	"Good Vibrations"	4:26
94.	"Johnny B. Goode"	2:39
95.	"Graduation Day"	3:41
96.	"Sloop John B"	4:07

Live in Boston – 11/23/67
No.	Title	Length
97.	"Help Me, Rhonda"	2:18
98.	"Barbara Ann"	2:08
99.	"Darlin'"	3:22
100.	"Surfer Girl"	2:47
101.	"Wouldn't It Be Nice"	2:03
102.	"God Only Knows"	3:08
103.	"California Girls"	2:52
104.	"Wild Honey"	3:16
105.	"Good Vibrations"	4:11
106.	"I Get Around"	3:13
107.	"Sloop John B"	3:06
108.	"Graduation Day"	3:01
109.	"Johnny B. Goode"	3:30

== Charts ==
Chart (2017)	Peak position
Scottish Albums (OCC)	30
UK Albums (OCC)	49
US Billboard 200	145

== See also ==
- The Beach Boys bootleg recordings
- List of unreleased songs recorded by the Beach Boys
