= The Very Best of the Beach Boys =

2001 greatest hits album by the Beach Boys

Greatest hits album by The Beach Boys
- Released: 30 June 2001
- Recorded: 1961–2001
- Genre: Rock
- Length: 1:17:46
- Label: EMI
- Producers: Brian Wilson, The Beach Boys

The Beach Boys chronology
Greatest Hits Volume Three: Best of the Brother Years 1970–1986 (2000)	The Very Best of the Beach Boys (2001)	Hawthorne, CA (2001)

Professional ratings
Review scores
Source	Rating
Allmusic	4.5/5 stars

The Very Best of the Beach Boys is a compilation album released by the American rock band the Beach Boys. The album was released by EMI in 2001 and features 30 of their greatest hits digitally remastered. It is the first compilation of the Beach Boys that makes a full retrospective of their career. Other compilations had already been released throughout the years, but only focusing on certain time periods of the band, or focusing on their complete career, but with several volumes.

== Track listing ==
All tracks written by Brian Wilson/Mike Love, unless otherwise noted.

1. "Good Vibrations" – 3:37 (from Smiley Smile)
2. "California Girls" (Single Version) – 2:43 (from Summer Days (And Summer Nights!!))
3. "I Get Around" – 2:14 (from All Summer Long)
4. "Wouldn't It Be Nice" (Brian Wilson, Tony Asher, Love) – 2:25 (from Pet Sounds)
5. "Surfin' Safari" – 2:07 (from Surfin' Safari)
6. "Fun, Fun, Fun" (Single Version) – 2:20 (from Shut Down Volume 2)
7. "Surfin' U.S.A." (Brian Wilson, Chuck Berry) – 2:29 (from Surfin' U.S.A.)
8. "Help Me Rhonda" – 2:47 (from Summer Days (And Summer Nights!!))
9. "Don't Worry Baby" (Brian Wilson, Roger Christian) – 2:50 (from Shut Down Volume 2)
10. "When I Grow Up (To Be a Man)" – 2:04 (from Today!)
11. "Little Deuce Coupe" (Brian Wilson, Christian) – 1:38 (from Surfer Girl)
12. "Dance, Dance, Dance" (Brian Wilson, Carl Wilson, Love) – 2:00 (from Today!)
13. "Little Honda" – 1:52 (from All Summer Long)
14. "Do You Wanna Dance?" (Bobby Freeman) – 2:21 (from Today!)
15. "Surfer Girl" (Brian Wilson) – 2:27 (from Surfer Girl)
16. "Then I Kissed Her" (Phil Spector, Ellie Greenwich, Jeff Barry) – 2:16 (from Summer Days (And Summer Nights!!))
17. "God Only Knows" (1996 Stereo Mix) (Brian Wilson, Asher) – 2:50 (from Pet Sounds, stereo remix from The Pet Sounds Sessions)
18. "Caroline, No" (Single Version, 1996 Stereo Mix) (Brian Wilson, Asher) – 2:19 (from Pet Sounds, stereo remix from The Pet Sounds Sessions)
19. "Sloop John B" (1996 Stereo Mix) (Traditional, Brian Wilson) – 2:55 (from Pet Sounds, stereo remix from The Pet Sounds Sessions)
20. "Barbara Ann" (Single Version) (Fred Fassert) – 2:06 (from Beach Boys' Party!)
21. "Heroes and Villains" (Brian Wilson, Van Dyke Parks) – 3:38 (from Smiley Smile)
22. "Do It Again" (Single Version) – 2:19 (from 20/20)
23. "Darlin'" – 2:13 (from Wild Honey)
24. "Wild Honey" – 2:38 (from Wild Honey)
25. "Break Away" (Brian Wilson, Murry Wilson) – 2:56 (non album single)
26. "Rock and Roll Music" (Single Version) (Berry) – 2:28 (from 15 Big Ones)
27. "I Can Hear Music" (Phil Spector, Ellie Greenwich, Jeff Barry) – 2:37 (from 20/20)
28. "Cotton Fields (The Cotton Song)" (Single Version) (Huddie Ledbetter) – 3:02 (from Stateside issues of Sunflower)
29. "Lady Lynda" (Alan Jardine, Ron Altbach) – 3:58 (from L.A. (Light Album))
30. "Kokomo" (Love, Scott McKenzie, Terry Melcher, John Phillips) – 3:37 (from Still Cruisin')

== Charts ==
Sales chart performance for The Very Best of The Beach Boys
Chart (2001)	Peak position
UK Albums (Official Charts)	31

Chart (2026)	Peak position
Greek Albums (IFPI)	29

== Certifications ==
Region	Certification	Certified units/sales
United Kingdom (BPI)	2× Platinum	600,000^{*}
^{*} Sales figures based on certification alone.
