= Lei'd in Hawaii =

Album by The Beach Boys

- The Beach Boys rehearsing on stage before their concerts in Hawaii (August 1967). From left: Brian Wilson, Al Jardine, Carl Wilson, Dennis Wilson (obscured), and Mike Love.

Live album (unfinished) by the Beach Boys
- Recorded: August 25 – September 29, 1967
- Venue: Honolulu International Center Arena, Hawaii
- Studio: Wally Heider and Beach Boys, Los Angeles

The Beach Boys recording chronology
Smiley Smile (1967)	Lei'd in Hawaii (1967)	Wild Honey (1967)

Lei'd in Hawaii is an unfinished live album by the American rock band the Beach Boys that was produced shortly after the completion of their 1967 studio album Smiley Smile. It was initially planned to include the band's first live concert performances since their tour of Europe in May 1967.

The two concerts, held at the Honolulu International Center Arena on August 25 and 26, featured a rare appearance from Brian Wilson, marking his only shows with the touring group between 1965 and 1970. It was also the band's first public appearance following their controversial withdrawal from the Monterey Pop Festival that summer. For this one-off engagement, the group arranged their songs in a similar stripped-down style as Smiley Smile, with Wilson on Baldwin organ. However, the band was underrehearsed and performed their sets poorly. Some of the members were also under the influence of LSD for the duration.

After deeming the concert tapes unsuitable for release, in September 1967, the group attempted to rerecord the entire performance as a "live-in-the-studio" album. Lei'd in Hawaii was ultimately abandoned in favor of recording the songs that formed their next album, Wild Honey (1967).

Commentators have highlighted Lei'd in Hawaii for offering unique reinterpretations of the Beach Boys' hits, notwithstanding the substandard sound quality. Some of the relevant recordings were later released on Beach Boys compilation albums, reissues, and bootlegs. In 2017, all studio tracks and live performances were collected for the official compilations 1967 – Sunshine Tomorrow, 1967 – Sunshine Tomorrow 2: The Studio Sessions, and 1967 – Live Sunshine.

== Background ==
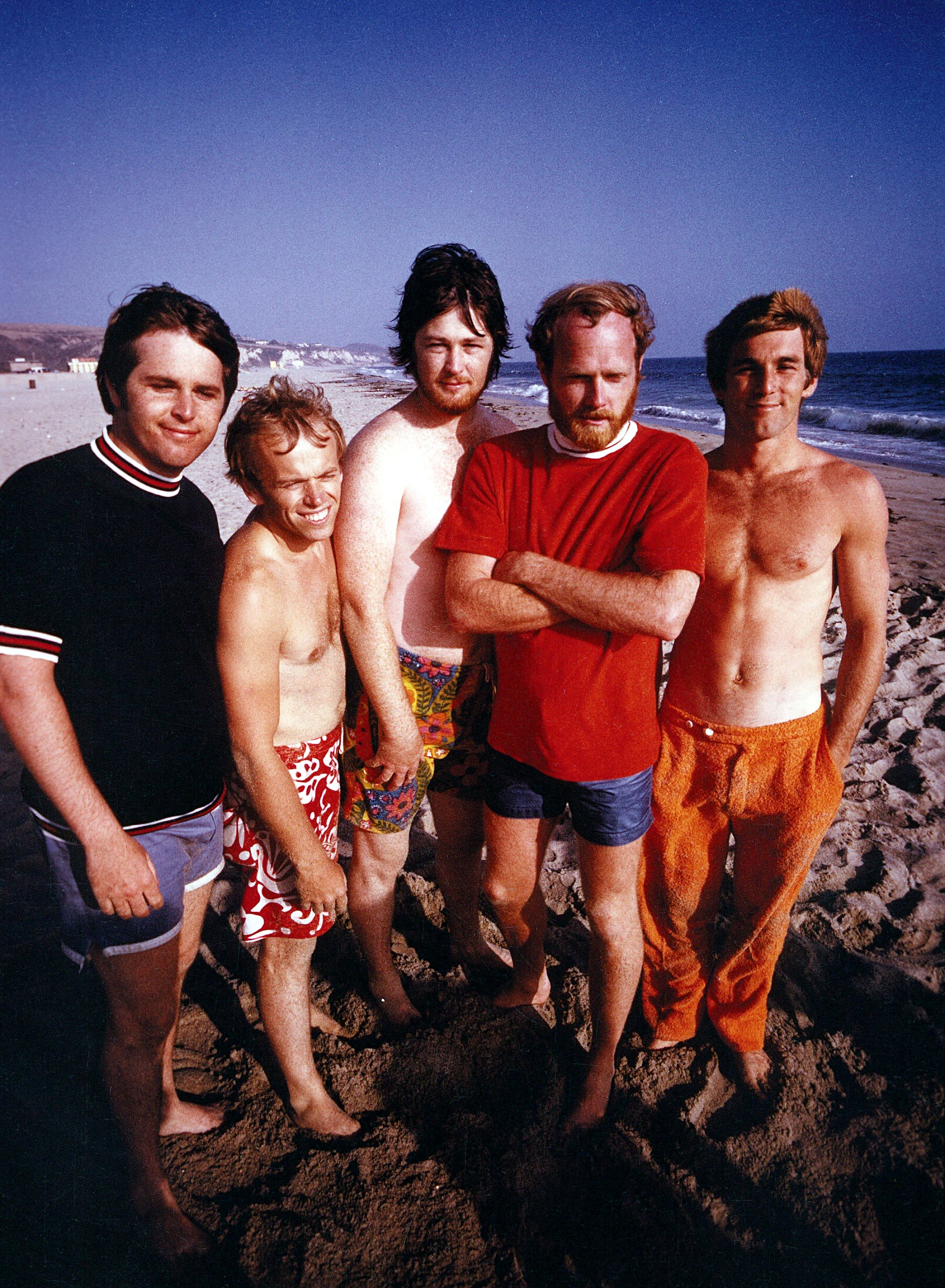
The Beach Boys at Zuma Beach in Malibu, July 1967, a few weeks before their concerts in Hawaii.

In May 1967, the regular touring members of the Beach Boys embarked on a run of shows in Europe. Their concerts in the United Kingdom, while selling out, were met with mixed reviews, a contrast from the high acclaim that British critics had bestowed upon them during the previous year. By the next month, Brian Wilson had declared to his bandmates that they would abandon most of the material recorded for their then-forthcoming album Smile. The Beach Boys also announced that they would not appear at the Monterey Pop Festival, for which they had been scheduled to play as headlining acts. Instead, from June to July, the band focused on completing what became their next album, Smiley Smile, released in September. Smile was left unfinished.

Band publicist Derek Taylor recalled, "They were certainly very heavily criticized at the time for their cancellation [at Monterey]. It seemed, in a way, rather like an admission of defeat." At the time, Wilson told The Honolulu Advertiser:

I think rock n' roll – the pop scene – is happening. It's great. But I think basically the Beach Boys are squares. We're not happening – but we've been so lucky in the past, it doesn't hurt now. We get enjoyment out of our recordings. [...] I'd say we have between three and five years more of Beach Boy-ing to go.

Conversely, Dennis Wilson reflected in a 1968 interview that he and his bandmates had become "very paranoid about the possibility of losing our public. We were getting loaded, taking acid, and we made a whole album which we scrapped. Instead, we went to Hawaii [and] rested up." According to music journalist Domenic Priore, the Lei'd in Hawaii concerts were the band's "attempt to make up for their non-appearance at the Monterey Pop Festival". Brian's 2016 memoir I Am Brian Wilson states of the project, "A promoter had scheduled a pair of shows there that we were going to film, maybe for a live album."

Rumors that the Beach Boys would soon play in Hawaii were reported in the Honolulu Star-Bulletin on July 29, 1967. An official announcement of the shows followed on August 3. Lei'd in Hawaii would have been their second live album, following Beach Boys Concert from October 1964.

== Live performances ==
The Beach Boys' Summer Spectacular
- Concert by the Beach Boys
- Location: Honolulu, Hawaii
- Venue: Honolulu International Center Arena
- Associated album: Smiley Smile
- Date: August 25–26, 1967
- No. of shows: 2
- Supporting acts: Paul Revere & the Raiders, Bobbie Gentry, the Val Richards Five, Dino, Desi & Billy, the Pickle Brothers

On August 24, 1967, the Beach Boys traveled to Hawaii to play at the Honolulu International Center Arena on August 25 and 26. Advertised as "the Beach Boys' Summer Spectacular", the concerts featured a rare appearance from Wilson, marking the first time he had played live with the band since their October 1965 appearances on The Andy Williams Show and Jack Benny Hour. (Note: Wilson would not play another concert with his group until March 1970, as a temporary fill-in for Mike Love.) Supporting acts were Paul Revere & the Raiders, Bobbie Gentry, the Val Richards Five, Dino, Desi & Billy (August 26 only), and comedians the Pickle Brothers (August 25 only).

Bruce Johnston, who had substituted for Wilson in concert since 1965, declined to attend the Hawaii shows. According to music historian Andrew Doe, this was because Johnston felt that the Beach Boys' situation "had all got too weird". Johnston told NME: "This is definitely a one-off appearance by Brian. I was invited to take part [...] but I shall not do so." (Note: Johnston's withdrawal was not to be a permanent arrangement; in the same interview, he added that he would rejoin "the group throughout its US tour, beginning next month.") Wilson was initially reluctant to travel with the band and agreed to take part only if they allowed him to bring his Baldwin organ.

Local reports stated that the performances, described as "a live recording session", marked the first live concerts ever recorded in Hawaii and advised that attendees "wear flower leis and bring along a ukulele". Asked why the band chose Hawaii as a venue, Brian responded, "Well, it's a good place. We wanted to do another live album where the mood's good. And it's great here. We're calling it Lei'd in Hawaii." Priore speculates that a concert film may have also been planned. Biographer Steven Gaines states that "the Beach Boys and their wives [went] to Hawaii for three weeks, to shoot a promotional film to be released in conjunction with the upcoming Smiley Smile album". In Priore's description, some of the footage captured during this epoch shows the group "romping around the idyllic island in paisley, aloha shirts and Jantzen sportswear with their wives and girlfriends".

The Beach Boys reconfigured their live set to be in a similar stripped-down style as the songs on Smiley Smile, and virtually everything the band performed, including their backstage rehearsals, was captured on eight-track recording machines that were shipped by Capitol Records specifically for the occasion. Their set-list included several past hits, as well as "Hawaii" from the 1963 album Surfer Girl, their newest singles "Heroes and Villains" and "Gettin' Hungry", and a rendition of the Box Tops' recent hit "The Letter". Footage of them performing "God Only Knows" was later included in the 1984 documentary The Beach Boys: An American Band. Wilson would never again sing "Heroes and Villains" before a public audience until 2001, for a Radio City Music Hall tribute concert held in his honor.

Biographer Jon Stebbins writes that Brian had convinced some of his bandmates to drop LSD before they took the stage, with less than desirable results. Upon their return to Los Angeles, the Beach Boys decided that the set was not suitable for release due to its poor sound quality, particularly with respect to the vocals, and the band's substandard performance. Reviewing the concerts for The Honolulu Advertiser, Wayne Harada wrote that they "probably will have to do a lot of studio editing. [...] While they still put together a pretty good package of rock, I suspect The Beach Boys will soon follow The Beatles in concentrating on recordings and eliminating live concerts altogether." According to Stebbins, the consensus among concert reviewers was that Bobbie Gentry "had stolen the show" from the other acts.

== Studio sessions ==
On September 11, 1967, the band went to Wally Heider Recording in Hollywood and attempted to rerecord the entire performance as a "live-in-the-studio" album with the intention of inserting an audience response track later. Production lasted until at least September 29, as the band rerecorded many of the same songs that they performed in Hawaii, as well as a cover version of the Mindbenders' "The Game of Love". A runthrough of "Heroes and Villains" was later overdubbed with a spoken-word monologue, given by Mike Love, in which he ridicules the song.

Several tracks were recorded before the idea was abandoned in favor of what became the Beach Boys' 13th studio album, Wild Honey. An assembled master reel from the Brother Records archives, dated September 29, suggests that the album may have also included cover versions of the Four Freshmen's "Their Hearts Were Full of Spring" (recorded during rehearsals on August 26) and the Beatles' "With a Little Help from My Friends" (recorded at Wilson's home, September 23). Johnston explained that they recorded the Beatles song "just to see how we would sound".

== Release ==
Capitol initially planned to follow Wild Honey with the release of Lei'd in Hawaii. On October 13, 1967, the company announced that the Beach Boys' next release would be Wild Honey and offered a preliminary tracklist, even though many of the songs had yet to be recorded at that point. This early version of the tracklist included a version of "The Letter", to serve as a teaser for the forthcoming live album. Lei'd in Hawaii was ultimately canceled and "The Letter" was not included on Wild Honey.

Portions of the Lei'd in Hawaii recordings were released piecemeal through various compilations and reissues, including Rarities (1983), Concert / Live in London (1990), Endless Harmony Soundtrack (1998), and Hawthorne, CA (2001). The August 25 show and Heider sessions were also available on the unauthorized compilation Aloha From Hawaii (And Hollywood). In 1994, bootleg label Vigotone released a compilation of the Lei'd in Hawaii recordings entitled Lei'd in Hawaii Rehearsal. It featured additional studio outtakes such as "We're Together Again" and "Sherry She Needs Me".

Further selections were released for the first time on the 2017 compilation album 1967 – Sunshine Tomorrow. The remaining unreleased recordings were released on its digital-exclusive follow-ups 1967 – Sunshine Tomorrow 2: The Studio Sessions and 1967 – Live Sunshine.

== Critical reception ==
Reviewing the released recordings of the band's Hawaii concerts, AllMusic's Stephen Thomas Erlewine wrote that they "show the band with a distinct chemistry and a way with swing". Biographer Peter Ames Carlin said that the studio sessions "have some nice moments", but afforded special attention to Love's "Heroes and Villains" rant. Priore felt that the "interesting part of the project was the rearrangement of older material, such as 'California Girls', which took on a beautiful, subtle vocal sound backed by Brian Wilson's organ. The grace of Smiley Smile gave the songs a new aura, the wavering falsetto on [...] 'Surfer Girl' being part prayer, part Flamingos 'I Only Have Eyes For You', part psychedelic improvisation."

Conversely, Pitchfork's Jesse Jarnow opined that while "it is a joy to hear the original Beach Boys do 'Heroes and Villains' in all its barbershop weirdness", the stripped-down quality of the performance "most definitely would not have passed the Monterey acid test against the likes of the Who and Jimi Hendrix". Uncut's David Cavanagh concurred that if the Beach Boys had appeared at the Monterey Pop Festival in this configuration, it "would have been catastrophic", opining that "the gigs they recorded in Hawaii weren't impressive at all [...] Dennis's drumming is wobbly, and Carl's guitar solos – in an era of Hendrix and Garcia – are a ham-fisted embarrassment."

== Set lists and tracks ==
Adapted from Sunshine Tomorrow.

Hawaii, August 25

1. "The Letter"
2. "Hawaii"
3. "You're So Good to Me"
4. "Surfer Girl"
5. "Surfin'"
6. "Gettin' Hungry"
7. "Sloop John B"
8. "California Girls"
9. "Wouldn't It Be Nice"
10. "Heroes and Villains"
11. "God Only Knows"
12. "Good Vibrations"
13. "Barbara Ann"

Hawaii, August 26

1. "Hawthorne Boulevard"
2. "Hawaii"
3. "You're So Good to Me"
4. "Help Me, Rhonda"
5. "California Girls"
6. "Wouldn't It Be Nice"
7. "Gettin' Hungry"
8. "Surfer Girl"
9. "Surfin'"
10. "Sloop John B"
11. "The Letter"
12. "God Only Knows"
13. "Good Vibrations"
14. "Heroes and Villains"
15. "Barbara Ann"

Wally Heider Recording, September 11–29

- "Sloop John B"
- "Help Me, Rhonda"
- "Good Vibrations"
- "California Girls"
- "Surfer Girl"
- "God Only Knows"
- "The Letter"
- "You're So Good to Me"
- "Game of Love"
- "Heroes and Villains"
- "Barbara Ann"
- "Surfin'"
- "With a Little Help from My Friends"

Also rehearsed, but not performed at the concerts, were "All Day All Night", "Their Hearts Were Full of Spring", and "The Lord's Prayer".
