= Vegetables (song) =

1967 song written by Brian Wilson and Van Dyke Parks

Song by the Beach Boys

from the album Smiley Smile
- Released: September 18, 1967
- Recorded: April 12 – June 3, 1967
- Studio: Gold Star, Sound Recorders, Columbia, and Beach Boys, Los Angeles
- Length: 2:07
- Label: Brother; Capitol
- Songwriters: Brian Wilson; Van Dyke Parks
- Producer: Brian Wilson

Licensed audio
- "Vegetables" on YouTube

Audio sample
- file; help

"Vega-Tables"

Song by the Beach Boys

from the album The Smile Sessions
- Released: October 31, 2011
- Recorded: April 4–14, 1967
- Length: 3:49
- Label: Capitol
- Songwriters: Brian Wilson; Van Dyke Parks
- Producer: Brian Wilson

Licensed audio
- "Vega-Tables" on YouTube

"Vegetables" (early versions titled "Vega-Tables") is a song by the American rock band the Beach Boys from their 1967 album Smiley Smile and their unfinished Smile project. Written by Brian Wilson and Van Dyke Parks, the song is a tongue-in-cheek promotion of organic food that was inspired by radio evangelist Curtis Howe Springer. It was one of the last songs recorded for Smile, with most of the original sessions held in April 1967. Paul McCartney of the Beatles is often reported to have contributed celery crunching sounds at an April session, however, it remains unclear if his performance was retained on any existing recording.

Wilson had declared that he would issue "Vegetables", rather than "Heroes and Villains", as the lead single from Smile, which exacerbated tensions with Parks, who had felt that the song was one of their least representative efforts. Parks soon withdrew from the project, and Smile was scrapped. The Smiley Smile version was then largely rerecorded in June with an arrangement consisting of the group's vocals, electric bass, organ, chomped vegetables, and air blown into water bottles. Months later, the band reworked one of its outtakes into a new a cappella song, "Mama Says", that was released as the closing track on their 1967 album Wild Honey.

Wilson rerecorded "Vegetables" with an arrangement closer to what he had originally envisioned for the song on his 2004 album Brian Wilson Presents Smile. New edits of the song that approximate the original Smile version were also created for the compilations Good Vibrations: Thirty Years of the Beach Boys (1993) and The Smile Sessions (2011).

== Background and inspiration ==
"Vegetables" was composed by Brian Wilson in 1966 and first recorded during the aborted Smile sessions. The song was based on Wilson's reported health obsession at the time. In a 1967 article, Wilson said, "I want to turn people on to vegetables, good natural food, organic food. Health is an important element in spiritual enlightenment. But I do not want to be pompous about it, so we will engage in a satirical approach." Parks said that the song was more specifically inspired by the radio evangelist Curtis Howe Springer, whom "Brian had a great fascination with", elaborating that Springer had spurred the "whole thing with vegetables. Curtis had an evangelist approach to his message. He was totally charismatic. And he needed a lot of money to continue his campaign. And, of course, it may be that we contributed to it somehow. We wanted to connect with this guy, maybe even meet him. We were sold on his health kick."

Conversely, The Saturday Evening Post writer Jules Siegel said that while using marijuana with Wilson and the "Beach Boys marijuana-consumption squad" Michael Vosse mused at how violence in their "vegetative" state could not be achieved, provoking laughter and further discussion of being a vegetable. Siegel said that this encounter was what inspired Wilson to write the song.

Frank Zappa's song "Call Any Vegetable" was written around the same period as "Vega-Tables". Parks knew Zappa, having performed with the Mothers of Invention; Parks' wife Durrie later recalled, "when Van Dyke and Brian were working on a song about vegetables, we thought, 'This is a natural.' And we took Brian to meet Frank ... I'll never forget the two of those guys shaking hands, talking about vegetables."

Although it is not definitely known to be true, "Vega-Tables" is generally believed to fulfill the Earth part of "The Elements" suite that Brian envisioned for Smile. One of the illustrations created for the album included "Vega-Tables" as part of "The Elements", however, a preliminary track list from December 1966 indicated "The Elements" and "Vega-Tables" as separate tracks.

The "Vega-Tables" spelling may have been inspired by the Vejtables, a group who opened for the Beach Boys at a concert on January 1, 1966.

== Composition and lyrics ==
"Vegetables" is in the key of E major. The main chord progression of verses is I-IV-I. Musicologist Philip Lambert notes this progression as a recurring element throughout Smile, with other songs such as "Wind Chimes" and "The Elements: Fire" also utilizing it.

While the subject matter was conceived by Wilson, the lyrics were written by his collaborator Van Dyke Parks, who incorporated wordplay and absurdist imagery into the song. An earlier recording, sometimes referred to as the "cornucopia" version, features an additional discarded verse: "Tripped on a cornucopia / Stripped the stalk green and I hope ya / Like me the most of all / My favorite vegetable".

Some versions of "Vegetables" feature an additional interpolated section after the verses involving Barbershop-style vocal harmonies sung by the Beach Boys. The lyrics are "Mom and Dad say/sleep a lot, eat a lot / brush 'em like crazy / run a lot, do a lot / never be lazy". This section was considered for inclusion on "Heroes and Villains" under the subheaders "Do a Lot" or "Sleep a Lot" in January 1967, prior to the recording of the rest of "Vegetables".

== Artwork ==
Smile artist Frank Holmes' "Vega-Tables" illustration

Artist Frank Holmes, who designed the Smile cover artwork, created an illustration that was inspired by the song's lyrics, "The Elements" / "My Vega-Tables". Along with several other drawings, they were planned to be included within a booklet packaged with the Smile LP. In 2005, Holmes shared a background summary of his design choices:

That’s two separate worlds, where they’re able to put two things together. Its an idea I picked up from Asian art, from early woodblock prints, where you could look down into a building and see what’s going on in two or three different rooms. By having this different viewpoint, you’re able to incorporate more than one thing, so here there’s an interior and an exterior, and two separate worlds. It’s just a device to separate the graphics, so that you can experience two things.

That block on the left is supposed to be a photograph of a body of water, with those little black things you clip onto the corners. That was all to do with the elements, of course.

‘Vega-table’ is a split-up word, so I’ve got V-E-G-A sitting on the tops of tables, combining those two images. I got the interior out of the surf thing, with the sun and nature, and birds flying in the sky. Then there’s a picture of someone smiling there, probably Brian. Then there’s all the vegetables growing there, with the water coming down from the bolt of lightning and faucets coming out of the clouds, dripping water onto the plants. And of course the electric socket. Got to have electricity.

== Smile recording history ==
External videos
- "Vega-Tables" (1966 demo)
- "Hal Blaine Vega-Tables Promo Session"
- "Heroes and Villains: Do a Lot"
- "Vega-Tables" (1993 Smile version)
- "Vegetables" (long version)

=== October 1966 – January 1967 sessions ===
The Beach Boys recorded the most rudimentary version of "Vegetables", a demo with different lyrics and a different vocal arrangement, on or around October 17, 1966. Band archivist Craig Slowinski suggests that the session may have taken place on this day, however the exact date is unknown. This demo contained the unused "cornucopia" verse.

On November 4, Wilson produced a session dedicated to capturing a "humorous" situation featuring himself, Parks, Danny Hutton, Vosse, and a man named Bob. Towards the end of the exercise, the group plays a rhythm on bongos while chanting "Where's my beets and carrots" and "I've got a big bag of vegetables". On November 16, Wilson produced another humor session, this time dedicated to recording mock disagreements between Vosse and session drummer Hal Blaine. The latter play-acts as a man that is irate at Vosse for trespassing into his garden. It later turns into a serious conversation between Blaine, Vosse, and Wilson about the planetary alignments. Wilson completes the session by having his own mock disagreement with Blaine. Badman writes, "At one point, it is believed that these recordings will somehow figure into the 'Vegetables' track itself." (Note: The arguments are similar to those featured in a later Beach Boys track, "T M Song", from 15 Big Ones (1976).)

The first major session dedicated to tracking any part of "Vegetables" took place on January 3, 1967. However, at this time, part of the song had been configured as a section of "Heroes and Villains" and logged with the title "Do a Lot". Material recorded this day did not become part of the finished song. During the session, Wilson can be heard saying to his bandmates before a take, "If there's not anymore cooperation of this, I'm splitting, I mean it. We better get back into the groove, you know?"

=== March–April 1967 sessions ===
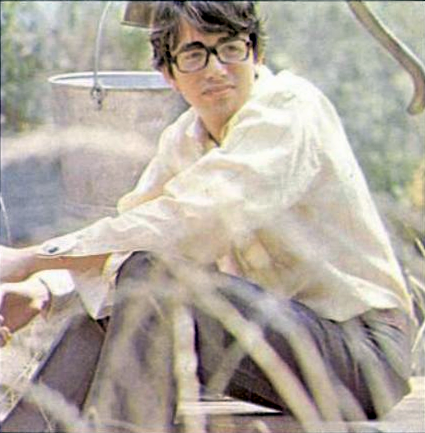
Smile lyricist Van Dyke Parks left the project after the "Vega-Tables" sessions

In February 1967, Wilson announced that "Vega-Tables" would be the lead single from Smile. At this time, the Beach Boys had engaged themselves in litigation against Capitol, and to taunt the record company, Wilson staged a mock promotion of the "Vega-Tables" by holding a photoshoot at the Los Angeles Farmers Market, where he posed in front of a fruit and vegetable stand. The location was at Fairfax Avenue and 3rd Street, only feet away from where Wilson opened a health food store, the Radiant Radish, two years later.

According to David Anderle, formerly the head of Brother Records, creative differences between Parks and Wilson had escalated since February. Parks was against having the song as the album's lead single, commenting, "[I didn't want] 'Vega-Tables' to be given too much emphasis. For Smile, that celebrated collaboration, to be dependent on a commercial release of 'Vega-Tables' as a single, was to me tremendously ill-advised, wherever it came from."

On March 2, after a session for "Heroes and Villains", their partnership was temporarily dissolved. A recording session for "Vega-Tables" vocals was held the next day, but further session dates, scheduled on March 28 and 30, were cancelled. Parks returned to the project after March 31.

The band spent at least eight studio dates recording "Vega-Tables" before embarking on a U.S. tour on April 14. Parks' last recorded appearance on the album's sessions was for a "Vega-Tables" date on April 14, after which he withdrew from the project. Wilson then took a four-week break from the studio. On April 29, band publicist Derek Taylor reported that the single, backed with "Wonderful", would soon be released. He described it as "a light and lyrical, day to day, green grocery song on which Al Jardine sings a most vigorous lead."

=== McCartney visit ===
During the April 10 vocal session at Sound Recorders, which also saw work on "Wonderful" and "Child Is Father of the Man", Paul McCartney of the Beatles joined the Beach Boys in the studio for several hours. (Note: McCartney had last met with Wilson in late August 1966, during which he was played an early acetate record of the Beach Boys' forthcoming "Good Vibrations" single. He returned to the United States in early April 1967 to reunite with his actress girlfriend Jane Asher and to learn of developments in the San Francisco music scene.) Asked about his involvement in a 2001 interview, McCartney said he had no memory of the session, where he was said to have chomped vegetables. However, in a 2016 Q&A given for his website, he offered a specific recollection:

I just went round to the studio because they invited me. I just thought it would be fun to sit there and watch them record, 'cause I’m a big fan. And so I was there, and then it was, I think, Brian who came over and said, "Oh Paul, got a favor to ask: would you mind recording something?" I thought, "Oh, no! But great, I could do that!" Oh God, I'm gonna be singing on a Beach Boys record or something, you know! I got a bit kind of intimidated and thought, "Okay, here goes nothing". And they said, "Well, what we want you to do is go in there and just munch!" … Well, I can do that! So, if you hear somebody munching celery, that’s me!

Jardine said, "I remember waiting for long periods of time between takes to get to the next section or verse. Brian [seemed to have] lost track of the session. Paul would come on the talkback and say something like "'Good take, Al.'" KROQ DJ Rodney Bingenheimer was also present, as he remembered, "We were in a booth, and we were supposed to shout out the names of vegetables. I was a young, punk kid at the time, and I shouted out 'TV dinners!' I didn't know..." Wilson's then-wife Marilyn recalled, "Brian had some fresh vegetables out, for the mood. He sprinkled salt all over the console table near the mixing board and started dipping celery into the salt and chomping on it. Paul followed his lead and picked up the celery and did the same thing. It was priceless to see this."

It is unclear if any record of McCartney's performance has survived, as his presence cannot be verified on existing session tapes. Craig Slowinski, who assembled the sessionography included with The Smile Sessions box set, stated: "I was ready to credit Sir Paul with 'veggie munching' [...] but since no tapes were found with his voice or reference to him, we figured I'd better not. Too hard to say that any veggie munching on his part remained on tape through the final stages of production." Sessions co-producer Mark Linett said, "Unless Paul is being very quiet, there’s no evidence that he’s a part of the chomping. And there’s quite a lot of discussion going on while that particular track is being recorded."

After the "Vega-Tables" session, McCartney performed his song "She's Leaving Home" on piano for Wilson and his wife. Wilson said: "We both just cried. It was beautiful." In turn, he performed "Wonderful" on piano for McCartney. Beatles roadie Mal Evans wrote about singing the traditional "On Top of Old Smokey" with McCartney and Wilson, but was not impressed by Wilson's avant-garde attitude to music: "Brian then put a damper on the spontaneity of the whole affair by walking in with a tray of water-filled glasses, trying to arrange it into some sort of session." In a January 1968 interview, Wilson stated of the McCartney episode, "It was a little uptight and we really didn't seem to hit it off. It didn't really flow. [...] It didn't really go too good."

== Smiley Smile recording history ==
The Smile album was reported scrapped on May 5, 1967. Starting on June 3, "Vega-Tables" was rerecorded for the new album Smiley Smile, where it was respelled "Vegetables" and reworked as a kind of campfire song. Apart from its coda (recorded in April 1967), the track was remade entirely from scratch. Wilson played the electric bass on this version and added organ overdubs to the final section of the song.

According to Al Jardine, "I remember telling Brian, 'We’ve got to do something different on this thing.' What the hell, it was four in the morning. I filled some water bottles, tuned it to the key of the song and blew air into the bottles. What you hear sounds like an old organ."

"Vegetables" was mixed to mono on June 3, 1967. A recording for "You're with Me Tonight", held on June 6, was logged as a "Vega-Tables" session.

== Release and reception ==
"Vegetables" was issued on September 18, 1967 as the second track on Smiley Smile. Melody Maker reviewed that "Vegetables" was among the "childish and pointless" songs that made Smiley Smile a "tragedy". A more positive review in Record Mirror complimented the vocal performances and speculated that the song could be released as a single by the group in the future.

Reviewing the song in AllMusic, Matthew Greenwald called it a "great example of the collaboration of Brian Wilson's and Van Dyke Parks' sense of comedy and psychedelic whimsy.", also noting it as among the strangest songs of the group's career. Music critic Ritchie Unterberger described it as an example of the "low-key psychedelic weirdness" present throughout Smiley Smile. Lambert wrote that the song heralded a "radically new artistic sensibility" for the group relative to Pet Sounds and Smile. David Leaf, writing in 1990, described the song as marking a new phase in Wilson's development as a musician.

Those who first heard this album in 1967 recall that the first four bars of “Vegetables” was the initial indication that Brian had given up the race to be the greatest producer in rock. With just a repeating bass and a jug (pouring juice as an effect), “Vegetables,” as it was released, marked the end of Brian Wilson’s reign as the “leader of the studio pack.” Of course, others felt that this track represented the beginning of Brian’s minimalist period and were blown away by Smiley Smile’s dry, trippy vocals, sparse production and incredible melodies…feeling that once again, as Brian had done on Pet Sounds, he was charting new territory.

The Smiley Smile rendition of the song was listed by Mojo as the Beach Boys' 47th greatest song, with the Mojo staff describing it as "endearingly daft", and praising the group's vocal harmonies and the "stripped back" arrangement. In 2015, the French edition of Rolling Stone named "Vegetables" the Beach Boys' 38th greatest song.

== "Mama Says" ==
"Mama Says"

Song by the Beach Boys

from the album Wild Honey
- Released: December 18, 1967
- Recorded: November 1967
- Studio: Wally Heider, Hollywood
- Length: 1:05
- Label: Capitol
- Songwriters: Brian Wilson; Mike Love
- Producer: The Beach Boys

Music video
- "Mama Says" on YouTube

In 1967, the song was revisited for the last time as the closing track "Mama Says" on Wild Honey (1967). This version consisted of an extended re-recording of the unused "Do or Lot" or "Sleep a Lot" module. It was the first time a track with thematic links to Smile was used to close a later Beach Boys album, a practice that the band repeated with "Cabinessence" on 20/20 (1969), "Cool, Cool Water" on Sunflower (1970), and "Surf's Up" on Surf's Up (1971).

Parks' songwriting credit was not honored, and instead Mike Love was listed as the song's only co-writer. Wilson's 2016 memoir, I Am Brian Wilson, makes note of this as an example of what he perceived as Love's questionable songwriting credits, but does not disclose a reason why he himself did not credit Parks.

== Alternate releases ==
- In 1993, a composite version from the Smile sessions was given its first official release, under its original title "Vega-Tables", along with a slew of other Smile material, on the Good Vibrations boxset.
- In 2001, some recordings related to the song were released on the rarities compilation Hawthorne, CA.
- In 2011, many more composite versions were made available on The Smile Sessions.
- In 2013, a 1993 live performance of the song was released on the compilation Made in California with Carl Wilson and Al Jardine on lead vocals.

== Cover versions ==
- 1967 – Jan and Dean (under the name Laughing Gravy) on a single released in 1967 and later under Jan and Dean on their 1971 Jan & Dean Anthology Album and in 1974 on their Gotta Take That One Last Ride album. The version on Gotta Take That One Last Ride contains additional instrumental and vocal overdubs by Brian Wilson and American Spring in 1973.
- 1991 – Sink, Vega-Tables
- 2001 – "Receptacle for the Respectable" from the album Rings Around the World by Super Furry Animals also features Paul McCartney chewing celery and carrots.

== Personnel ==
The details in this section are adapted from The Smile Sessions liner notes, which includes a sessionography compiled by band archivist Craig Slowinski. and from Keith Badman

=== The Smile Sessions edit ===
The Beach Boys

- Al Jardine – lead, backing and harmony vocals, miscellaneous percussion and sound effects, vegetable chomping, whistling (uncertain credit)
- Mike Love – backing and harmony vocals, laughter, vegetable chomping
- Brian Wilson – backing and harmony vocals, laughter, grand piano, miscellaneous percussion and sound effects, vegetable chomping, detuned grand piano, electric harpsichord, whistling (uncertain credit)
- Carl Wilson – backing and harmony vocals, laughter, miscellaneous percussion and sound effects, vegetable chomping, Fender bass, overdubbed ukulele
- Dennis Wilson – backing and harmony vocals, laughter, miscellaneous percussion and sound effects, vegetable chomping, thump percussion, overdubbed drum, xylophone, rattling percussion

Session musicians

- Arnold Belnick – violin
- Samuel Boghossian – viola
- Chuck Berghofer – overdubbed upright bass (verses)
- Joseph DiFiore – viola
- Joseph DiTullio – cello
- Jim Gordon – hi-hat, castanet, cups
- Raymond Kelley – cello
- William Kurasch – violin
- Nick Pellico – vibraphone
- Bill Pitman – tenor ukulele (Danelectro bass on early takes)
- Ray Pohlman – Fender bass (fade)
- Lyle Ritz – upright bass (fade)

=== Partial sessionography ===
- Likely October 17, 1966 - Columbia ["Cornucopia"] (discarded demo)
  - Brian Wilson – grand piano, lead vocals, backing vocals & laughter
  - Mike Love - lead vocals, backing vocals & laughter
  - Dennis Wilson - backing vocals & laughter
  - Carl Wilson - backing vocals & laughter
  - Al Jardine - backing vocals & laughter
  - Bruce Johnston - backing vocals & laughter
  - Marilyn Wilson - backing vocals & laughter
  - Diane Rovell - backing vocals & laughter
- November 11, 1966 - Western ["Promo"] (this session produced a Vegetables-themed spoken-word skit primarily featuring Brian Wilson and Hal Blaine, likely intended for incorporation into the final track)
  - Brian Wilson - spoken word
  - Hal Blaine - spoken word
  - Michael Vosse - spoken word
- January 3, 1967 – Columbia ["Do a Lot"] (discarded recording)
  - Brian Wilson – group vocals, upright piano, overdubbed grand piano, overdubbed whistling (uncertain credit)
  - Dennis Wilson - group vocals, overdubbed thumb percussion (uncertain credit)
  - Carl Wilson - group vocals
  - Mike Love - group vocals
  - Al Jardine - group vocals
  - Bruce Johnston - group vocals
- April 4, 1967 – Sound Recorders ["Verse"] (this session produced the master take for the verse)
  - Brian Wilson – grand piano, backing and harmony vocals, laughter
  - Al Jardine - backing and harmony vocals, laughter
  - Dennis Wilson - backing and harmony vocals, laughter
  - Carl Wilson - backing and harmony vocals, laughter
  - Mike Love - backing and harmony vocals, laughter
- April 6, 1967 – Sound Recorders ["Verse"] (this session produced the bass track and sound effects overdubs for the verse)
  - Chuck Berghofer – overdubbed upright bass
  - Brian Wilson - miscellaneous percussion and sound effects
  - Carl Wilson - miscellaneous percussion and sound effects
  - Al Jardine - miscellaneous percussion and sound effects
- April 7, 1967 – Columbia ["Sleep a Lot"] (this session produced the "sleep a lot" section)
  - Brian Wilson – vocals, detuned grand piano
  - Dennis Wilson - vocals, thump percussion
  - Carl Wilson - vocals
  - Mike Love - vocals
  - Al Jardine - vocals
- April 10, 1967 – Sound Recorders ["Verse"] (this session produced the verse lead vocal and sound effect overdubs)
  - Al Jardine - double-tracked lead vocals, overdubbed veggie chomping
  - Brian Wilson – overdubbed veggie chomping
  - Dennis Wilson - overdubbed veggie chomping
  - Carl Wilson - overdubbed veggie chomping
  - Mike Love - overdubbed veggie chomping
- April 11, 1967 – Sound Recorders ["Chorus 1" and "2nd Chorus"] (this session produced the first and second chorus)
  - Brian Wilson – electric harpsichord, group vocals, whistling (2nd Chorus, uncertain credit)
  - Carl Wilson – fender bass, group vocals
  - Dennis Wilson – group vocals, xylophone, overdubbed drum (Chorus 1), rattling percussion (2nd Chorus)
  - Mike Love - group vocals, bass vocals (2nd Chorus)
  - Al Jardine - group vocals, bass vocals (2nd Chorus) whistling (2nd Chorus, uncertain credit)
- April 12, 1967 – Gold Star ["Fade"] (this session produced the fade)
  - Bill Pitman - tenor ukulele (Danelectro bass with fuzztone on earlier takes)
  - Ray Polhman - Fender bass, overdubbed high Fender bass
  - Lyle Ritz - upright bass (arco)
  - Jim Gordon - hi-hat, castanet, and cups (drums and bongos on earlier takes)
  - Nick Pellico - vibes
  - Arnold Belnick - violin
  - William Kurasch - violin
  - Samuel Boghossian - viola
  - Joseph DiFiore - viola
  - Joseph DiTullio - cello
  - Raymond Kelley - cello
  - Brian Wilson - conductor (upright piano on earlier takes)
- April 12, 1967 – Sound Recorders ["Fade" and "Insert (Part 4)"] (these sessions produced the insert preceding the fade and the vocals on the fade)
  - Brian Wilson - grand piano, vocals (Insert Part 4), backing vocals (Fade)
  - Carl Wilson - vocals (Insert Part 4), backing vocals, overdubbed ukulele (Fade)
  - Mike Love - vocals (Insert Part 4), bass vocals (Fade)
  - Al Jardine - vocals (Insert Part 4), scat lead vocals (Fade)
- April 13, 1967 – Sound Recorders ["Fade"] (this session produced Brian's overdubbed falsetto vocal on the fade)
  - Brian Wilson - overdubbed wordless falsetto vocals
- April 14, 1967 – Sound Recorders ["Ballad Insert"] (this session produced the ballad insert used as part of the song's outro)
  - Brian Wilson - lead vocals, stacked backing vocals, grand piano
- June 3, 5-7 1967 – Western Recorders (new modules attempted for the song as the first sessions for Smiley Smile)
  - Al Jardine - vocals
  - Brian Wilson – vocals, electric bass, overdubbed organ
  - Dennis Wilson - vocals
  - Carl Wilson - vocals
  - Mike Love - vocals
  - Lyle Ritz - upright bass
- June 15, 1967 – Bel Air (final vocals recorded for the song)
  - Al Jardine - vocals
  - Brian Wilson – vocals
  - Dennis Wilson - vocals
  - Carl Wilson - vocals

== Bibliography ==
- Badman, Keith (2004). The Beach Boys: The Definitive Diary of America's Greatest Band, on Stage and in the Studio. Backbeat Books. ISBN 978-0-87930-818-6.
- Matijas-Mecca, Christian (2017). The Words and Music of Brian Wilson. ABC-CLIO. ISBN 978-1-4408-3899-6.
- Lambert, Philip (2007). Inside the Music of Brian Wilson: the Songs, Sounds, and Influences of the Beach Boys' Founding Genius. Continuum. ISBN 978-0-8264-1876-0.
- Leaf, David (2025). SMiLE: The Rise, Fall, and Resurrection of Brian Wilson. Omnibus Press. ISBN 978-1-915841-31-5.
- Peet, Preston; Siegel, Jules (2004). "The Last Word On Drugs". Under the Influence: The Disinformation Guide to Drugs (First ed.). New York, United States: Disinfo. ISBN 1932857001.
- Priore, Domenic (2005). Smile: The Story of Brian Wilson's Lost Masterpiece. Sanctuary. ISBN 1-86074-627-6.
- Williams, Paul; Anderle, David (1995) [1968]. "A Celebration of Wild Honey". In Priore, Domenic (ed.). Look, Listen, Vibrate, Smile!. Last Gasp. pp. 220–241. ISBN 0-86719-417-0.
- Wilson, Brian; Greenman, Ben (2016). I Am Brian Wilson: A Memoir. Da Capo Press. ISBN 978-0-306-82307-7.
