= Hawthorne, CA (album) =

Compilation album by the Beach Boys
- Released: 22 May 2001
- Recorded: 1960 – October 1999
- Genre: Rock
- Length: 1:46:15
- Label: Capitol 7243 5 31583 2
- Producers: Mark Linett and Alan Boyd

The Beach Boys chronology
The Very Best of The Beach Boys (2000)	Hawthorne, CA (2001)	Classics Selected by Brian Wilson (2002)

Professional ratings
Review scores
Source	Rating
AllMusic	2.5/5 stars
Encyclopedia of Popular Music	3/5 stars
The Rolling Stone Album Guide	2/5 stars

Hawthorne, CA, subtitled Birthplace of a Musical Legacy, is the second anthology collection by the Beach Boys, released through Capitol Records. A double CD, it was put together after the positive reaction to the Endless Harmony Soundtrack to give hardcore Beach Boys fans more rarities and alternate versions of well-known songs. The collection features spoken word tracks from different band members recorded throughout the 1990s during production of the Endless Harmony documentary, as well as a clip from a 1969 radio show. Home recordings dating back to 1960 and a backing track from 1973's "Sail On, Sailor" were also included. It never charted in either the United States or the United Kingdom. It is currently out of print on CD but remains available for digital downloads and streaming.

== Track listing ==
All tracks written by Mike Love and Brian Wilson except where noted.

Disc 1
No.	Title	Length
1.	"Mike Love Introduces 'Surfin''"	0:48
2.	"3701 West 119th Street, Hawthorne, California: The 'Surfin'' Rehearsal"	2:40
3.	"Happy Birthday Four Freshman"	0:56
4.	"Mike On Brian's Harmonies"	0:45
5.	"Their Hearts Were Full of Spring" (Bobby Troup)	2:31
6.	"Surfin' U.S.A. (Demo)" (Brian Wilson, Chuck Berry)	2:03
7.	"Surfin' U.S.A. (Backing track)" (Brian Wilson/Chuck Berry)	2:35
8.	"Carl Wilson Radio Promo"	0:15
9.	"Shut Down (Live in Chicago 1965)" (Brian Wilson, Roger Christian)	1:56
10.	"Little Deuce Coupe (Demo)" (Brian Wilson, Roger Christian)	1:51
11.	"Murry Wilson Directs A Radio Promo"	0:25
12.	"Fun, Fun, Fun (Backing track)"	2:26
13.	"Brian's Message to 'Rog' - Take 22"	0:29
14.	"Dance, Dance, Dance (Stereo Remix)" (Brian Wilson, Carl Wilson, Mike Love)	2:05
15.	"Kiss Me, Baby (A cappella mix)"	2:50
16.	"Good to My Baby (Backing track)"	2:32
17.	"Chuck Britz On Brian In The Studio"	0:21
18.	"Salt Lake City (Session highlights)"	1:49
19.	"Salt Lake City (Stereo remix)"	2:08
20.	"Wish That He Could Stay (Session excerpt)"	1:12
21.	"And Your Dream Comes True (Stereo remix)"	1:06
22.	"Carol K Session Highlights"	2:12
23.	"The Little Girl I Once Knew (Alternate version)" (Brian Wilson)	2:33
24.	"Alan and Dennis Introduce "Barbara Ann"	0:29
25.	"Barbara Ann (Session excerpt)" (Fred Fassert)	2:52
26.	"Barbara Ann (Master take without Party overdubs)" (Fred Fassert)	3:08
27.	"Mike On The Everly Brothers"	0:22
28.	"Devoted to You (Master take without Party overdubs)" (Felice and Boudleaux Bryant)	2:19
29.	"Dennis Thanks Everybody/In the Back of My Mind"	2:25

Disc 2
No.	Title	Length
1.	"Can't Wait Too Long (A cappella mix)" (Brian Wilson)	0:50
2.	"Dennis Introduces Carl"	0:43
3.	"Good Vibrations (Stereo track sections)"	3:13
4.	"Good Vibrations (Concert rehearsal)"	4:09
5.	"Heroes and Villains (Stereo single version)" (Brian Wilson, Van Dyke Parks)	3:40
6.	"Vegetables (Promo - instrumental section)" (Brian Wilson, Van Dyke Parks)	0:56
7.	"Vegetables (Stereo extended mix)" (Brian Wilson, Van Dyke Parks)	3:01
8.	"You're with Me Tonight" (Brian Wilson)	0:49
9.	"Lonely Days" (Unknown)	0:49
10.	"Bruce on "Wild Honey"	0:14
11.	"Let the Wind Blow (Stereo remix)"	2:35
12.	"I Went to Sleep (A cappella mix)" (Brian Wilson, Carl Wilson)	1:35
13.	"Time to Get Alone (Alternate version)" (Brian Wilson)	3:39
14.	"Alan And Brian Talk About Dennis"	0:19
15.	"A Time to Live in Dreams " (Dennis Wilson, Stephen Kalinich)	1:50
16.	"Be with Me (Backing track)" (Dennis Wilson)	3:17
17.	"Dennis Introduces "Cotton Fields"	0:10
18.	"Cottonfields (The Cotton Song) (Stereo single version)" (Huddie Ledbetter)	3:15
19.	"Alan And Carl on "Break Away"	0:21
20.	"Break Away (Alternate version)" (Brian Wilson, Reggie Dunbar)	3:12
21.	"Add Some Music to Your Day (A cappella mix)" (Brian Wilson, Mike Love, Joe Knott)	3:29
22.	"Dennis Wilson"	0:27
23.	"Forever (A cappella mix)" (Dennis Wilson, Gregg Jakobson)	2:51
24.	"Sail On, Sailor (Backing track)" (Brian Wilson, Van Dyke Parks, Tandyn Almer, Raymond Louis Kennedy, Jack Rieley)	3:16
25.	"Old Man River (Vocal section)" (Jerome Kern, Oscar Hammerstein II)	1:20
26.	"Carl Wilson"	0:39
27.	"The Lord's Prayer (Stereo remix)" (Albert Hay Malotte)	2:33
28.	"Carl Wilson - Coda"	2:28
