= Alan Boyd =

American record producer

- Occupations: Musician, record producer, audio engineer, filmmaker
- Years active: 1980s–present
- Website: boydproductiongroup.com

Alan Boyd is an American musician, sound engineer, record producer, and filmmaker who is best known for his work with the Beach Boys. Since the 1980s, he has been an archive manager for the band's Brother Records. Since 2000, he has worked alongside engineer Mark Linett on the Beach Boys' regular stream of archival releases. In 2013, Boyd was among the recipients of the Grammy Award for Best Historical Album for The Smile Sessions (2011).

== Discography ==
Producer

- Hawthorne, CA (2001)
- The Smile Sessions (2011)
- Made in California (2013)
- Keep an Eye On Summer – The Beach Boys Sessions 1964 (2014)
- 1967 – Sunshine Tomorrow (2017)
- Wake the World: The Friends Sessions (2018)
- I Can Hear Music: The 20/20 Sessions (2018)
- The Beach Boys On Tour: 1968 (2018)

== Filmography ==
Directorials

- The Beach Boys: Nashville Sounds (1996)
- Hey, Hey We're the Monkees (1997)
- Endless Harmony: The Beach Boys Story (1998)

Producer

- The Beach Boys: An American Family (2000)

== See also ==
- List of unreleased songs recorded by the Beach Boys
- "Ocean of Wisdom": a documentary film on His Holiness, Dalai Lamar XIV (1990); Managing Editor
