= Let the Wind Blow =

Song by the Beach Boys

from the album Wild Honey
- Released: December 18, 1967
- Recorded: November 1967
- Genre: Ballad
- Length: 2:19
- Label: Capitol
- Songwriters: Brian Wilson; Mike Love
- Producer: The Beach Boys

Licensed audio
- "Let the Wind Blow" on YouTube

"Let the Wind Blow" is a song by American rock band the Beach Boys from their 1967 album Wild Honey. Written by Mike Love and Brian Wilson, the song is a ballad with lyrics that metaphorically relate nature to the essence of love.

== Background and composition ==
According to biographers Andrew Doe and John Tobler, "Let the Wind Blow" was composed primarily by Love and "rearranged" by Brian. It marked the first composition recorded by the group that is in 3/4 time from beginning to end.

In his analysis of the song, musicologist Daniel Harrison called it "the most arresting and compositionally assured song on the album" adding that "it echoes the formal and harmonic technique of 'God Only Knows'."

== Critical reception ==
Stylus Magazine wrote: "'Let the Wind Blow' is a moody ballad that swirls and throbs with a subtle psychedelia more hinted at than indulged in; proof of a growing sophistication that improves upon the Smiley Smile formula." In 1968, Gene Sculatti said the song was further evidence of Wilson's "weird ear for melody". PopMatters wrote that, in contrast to the Wild Honey single "Darlin'", "'Let the Wind Blow' ... is forlorn and urgent, with a gripping chorus and somber production. It’s fantastic."

== Variations ==
- An alternate stereo mix of "Let the Wind Blow" was included on the rarities compilation Hawthorne CA (2001).
- A live performance of the song appears on the album The Beach Boys in Concert (1973).

== Personnel ==
Sourced from John Brode, Will Crerar, Joshilyn Hoisington, and Craig Slowinski.

The Beach Boys

- Al Jardine – unison vocals
- Bruce Johnston – unison vocals, bass guitar
- Mike Love – lead vocals
- Brian Wilson – lead, unison and backing vocals, grand piano, Baldwin organ
- Carl Wilson – co-lead, unison and backing vocals, acoustic guitar
- Dennis Wilson – drums

== Cover versions ==
- 1995 – Brian Wilson, I Just Wasn't Made for These Times
