= Aren't You Glad =

Song by the Beach Boys

from the album Wild Honey
- Released: December 18, 1967
- Studio: Wally Heider, Los Angeles
- Genre: Soul
- Length: 2:16
- Label: Capitol
- Songwriters: Brian Wilson; Mike Love
- Producer: The Beach Boys

Music video
- "Aren't You Glad" on YouTube

"Aren't You Glad" is a song by the American rock band the Beach Boys, written by Brian Wilson and Mike Love. The two also share lead vocals. Recording began in early October 1967 and concluded in November. It was released in December as the second track on their studio album Wild Honey.

In its 1968 review of the LP, Rolling Stone called it a "Lovin' Spoonful type song with the Beach Boys touch". That year, Rolling Stone editor Gene Sculatti said it "achieves a Miracles style smoothness via a Bobby Goldsboro-type song". In 1979, Byron Preiss wrote that the song "epitomized the simple energy of the album".

A live version was released on the album Live in London (1970).

== Personnel ==
Credits sourced from John Brode, Will Crerar, Joshilyn Hoisington, and Craig Slowinski

The Beach Boys

- Bruce Johnston – backing vocals, bass guitar, handclaps
- Mike Love – lead and backing vocals
- Brian Wilson – lead and backing vocals, grand piano (with taped strings), grand piano, Baldwin organ, drums, handclaps
- Carl Wilson – backing vocals, electric guitar, handclaps

Session musicians

- Arnold Belnick – violin
- Norman Botnick – viola
- David Burk – viola
- Bonnie Douglas – violin
- Ollie Mitchell – trumpets
- Alexander Neiman – viola
- Wilbert Nuttycombe – violin
- Jerome Reisler – violin
- Paul Shure – violin
- Anthony Terran – trumpets

== Cover versions ==
- 1968 – Peggy March
