= Can't Wait Too Long =

1990 song by the Beach Boys

Song by the Beach Boys

from the album Smiley Smile/Wild Honey
- Released: September 1990
- Recorded: October 28, 1967–July 26, 1968
- Genre: Rhythm and blues, psychedelic pop
- Length: 5:33
- Label: Capitol
- Songwriter: Brian Wilson
- Producer: Brian Wilson

Audio sample
- file; help

"Can't Wait Too Long"

Song by Brian Wilson

from the album That Lucky Old Sun
- Released: September 2, 2008
- Recorded: April 2008
- Length: 0:54
- Label: Capitol
- Songwriter: Brian Wilson
- Producer: Brian Wilson

"Can't Wait Too Long" (also known as "Been Way Too Long") is a song written by Brian Wilson for the American rock band the Beach Boys. The song dates from 1967, and remains unfinished by the group. In 2008, a newly recorded "Can't Wait Too Long" was released for Wilson's solo album That Lucky Old Sun.

== Composition ==
The Beach Boys version consists of an elaborate collection of vocal and instrumental tracks comparable to the group's earlier compositions "Good Vibrations" and "Heroes and Villains". It includes a melody line played instrumentally without sung lyrics, a bass line bearing resemblance to the Smile sessions' version of "Wind Chimes", plus several sections of chorus and a vocal middle section. It was recorded throughout 1967 and 1968, well after the sessions for Smile ended. On February 11, 1980, overdubs were attempted on the original late 1960s recordings.

Brian Wilson sings lead vocals. There are very few lyrics. The title phrase is sung several dozen times, sometime alternating with "been way too long". Elsewhere is a simple couplet: "I miss you darlin' / I miss you so hard" which was evidently meant to be followed with "So come back baby / and don't break my heart", as Wilson can be heard instructing the other Beach Boys. The final arrangement of the tune segues into an R&B inspired arrangement, and towards the end of the master outtake, there is a bass riff that had been labeled for years as an edit piece that is part of the "Heroes and Villains" suite — consult the bootleg album, Unsurpassed Masters Vol. 17.

== Reception ==
Biographer David Leaf said: "[the song] needs no analysis or description other than to say that it’s an incredible piece of music ... sections of it are complete enough to be a terrific example of how Brian, in Van Dyke Parks's words, used to 'saturate the tape with music.'"

== Releases ==
The song was eventually released in a sound collage form in September 1990, as a bonus track on a CD reissue compiling two Beach Boys albums onto one disc—Smiley Smile/Wild Honey. A shorter form of the song was also released in June 1993 on the group's 5-disc anthology, Good Vibrations: Thirty Years of the Beach Boys. On the latter version, Brian Wilson is heard instructing brother Carl on some other lyrics which were never recorded. In May 2001, a 51-second a cappella version of the song was issued on disc two of the Beach Boys rarities compilation album Hawthorne, CA. This same version reappears on the 2013 Made in California box set. An early version of the track can be found on 1967 – Sunshine Tomorrow, released June 30, 2017. A longer version, titled "Been Way Too Long (Sections)", appears on I Can Hear Music: The 20/20 Sessions, released in December 7, 2018. Another edit was released for the 2022 compilation Sounds of Summer: Expanded Edition.

== Personnel ==
Credits sourced from John Brode, Will Crerar, Joshilyn Hoisington, and Craig Slowinski.

=== Version 1 (October 28 1967) ===
The Beach Boys

- Al Jardine - backing vocals, electric lead guitar
- Bruce Johnston - backing vocals
- Brian Wilson - lead vocals, grand piano, snare drum
- Carl Wilson - backing vocals, electric rhythm guitar, bass guitar, percussion

=== Version 2 (November 1 1967) ===
The Beach Boys

- Al Jardine - backing vocals, bass guitar
- Bruce Johnston - backing vocals, upright piano (with taped strings)
- Brian Wilson - lead and backing vocals, percussion
- Carl Wilson - backing vocals, electric guitars

=== Part 2 "Tag" (October-November 1967) ===
The Beach Boys

- Al Jardine - tambourine
- Brian Wilson - Baldwin organ, hi-hat
- Carl Wilson - 6-string bass guitar, snare drum, handclaps
