= With Me Tonight =

1967 song by The Beach Boys

Song by the Beach Boys

from the album Smiley Smile
- Released: September 18, 1967
- Recorded: June 30, 1967
- Studio: Brian Wilson's home studio, Los Angeles
- Genre: Psychedelic, doo wop
- Length: 2:17
- Label: Capitol
- Songwriter(s): Brian Wilson
- Producer(s): The Beach Boys

Audio sample
- "With Me Tonight": file; help

"You're With Me Tonight"

Song by the Beach Boys

from the album Hawthorne, CA
- Released: May 22, 2001
- Recorded: June 5–7, 1967
- Studio: Brian Wilson's home studio, Los Angeles
- Length: 0:49
- Label: Capitol
- Songwriter(s): Brian Wilson

"With Me Tonight" is a song written by Brian Wilson for the American rock band the Beach Boys. It was released on their 1967 album Smiley Smile. The piece has been characterized as "psychedelic doo wop" and the similar descriptor "do it yourself acid casualty doo-wop".

AllMusic called the track "one of the better (or, more accurately, refined) songs on the Smiley Smile album" and said that "the melody envelopes the listener in a graceful way, and, in this sense, makes it quite different from many of the other songs on the album." In the liner notes of the Smiley Smile/Wild Honey set, the song is described as "probably the best of the non-official Smile tunes on the LP."

== Recording ==
"With Me Tonight" originated during the Smile sessions as "You're With Me Tonight". The intro was recorded as a vocal chant; later, it was expanded into a song for Smiley Smile and the "you're" in its title was omitted.

One of Brian's vocal instructions to the group was to sing the song while smiling.

At approximately 0:26, one can hear a voice say "good." This was thought to be an accident when Arnie Geller, a friend of Brian Wilson's, said it during the vocal take. The group liked it so much that they left it in the final take.

== Variations ==
Early versions of the song entitled "You're With Me Tonight" appear on the compilations Hawthorne, CA (2001) and The Smile Sessions (2011).

== Personnel ==
=== Smiley Smile version ===
The Beach Boys

- Carl Wilson – lead vocals

=== The Smile Sessions version ===
Per Craig Slowinski.

The Beach Boys

- Al Jardine - lead and backing vocals
- Mike Love - backing vocals
- Brian Wilson - lead and backing vocals, electric harpsichord, fingersnaps, handclaps
- Carl Wilson - lead and backing vocals, bass guitar
- Dennis Wilson - backing vocals

Session musician

- Chuck Berghofer - double bass

== Cover version ==
- Sandy Salisbury (under the title "On and On She Goes")
