= Darlin' (The Beach Boys song) =

1967 single by the Beach Boys

- U.S. picture sleeve

Single by the Beach Boys

from the album Wild Honey
- B-side: "Here Today"
- Released: December 18, 1967
- Recorded: October 10 to November 3, 1967
- Studio: Wally Heider Recording, Hollywood
- Genre: Soul; R&B
- Length: 2:12
- Label: Capitol
- Songwriters: Brian Wilson; Mike Love
- Producer: The Beach Boys

The Beach Boys singles chronology
"Wild Honey" (1967)	"Darlin'" (1967)	"Friends" (1968)

Music video
- "Darlin'" on YouTube

"Darlin'" is a song by the American rock band the Beach Boys from their 1967 album Wild Honey. Written by Brian Wilson and Mike Love, it was inspired by singer Danny Hutton (the title word featured heavily in his vocabulary) and was originally intended to be recorded by an early version of Three Dog Night. Carl Wilson ultimately sang the lead vocal.

Released as the second single from Wild Honey, "Darlin'" peaked at number 19 in the U.S. and number 11 in the UK. Artists who have covered the song include David Cassidy, Paul Davis, Yipes!, Tatsuro Yamashita, Sweet Trip, and Darlin', the band that later evolved into Daft Punk.

== Background and recording ==
"Thinkin' 'Bout You Baby"

Single by Sharon Marie
- Released: June 1, 1964
- Recorded: April 1964
- Length: 2:35
- Songwriters: Brian Wilson; Mike Love
- Producer: Brian Wilson

Sharon Marie singles chronology
"Runaround Lover" (1963)	"Thinkin' 'Bout You Baby" (1964)

The song interpolates the verse melody and chords of "Thinkin' 'Bout You Baby", an earlier Wilson-Love composition that was first recorded in April 1964 and released as a single two months later by Sharon Marie—a teenager Love met at a June 1963 Beach Boys concert in Sonoma County and helped sign to Capitol Records—with production by Wilson himself. The track was included on the 2004 compilation Pet Projects: The Brian Wilson Productions.

Working in 1967, Wilson weaved a "radically different" hook and chorus into these preexisting elements. He recalled, "I was writing more in a soul/R&B bag. The horns were conceived as a Phil Spector kind of a horn thing. ... That song took about a week to write." Singer Danny Hutton laid claim to inspiring the title for "Darlin'", it being frequent in his vocabulary at the time.

Wilson produced the instrumental track for "Darlin'" on October 11, 1967. Initially, he had planned to give this song and "Time to Get Alone" to Hutton's group Redwood (later known as Three Dog Night). Redwood only got as far as recording a guide vocal before Carl Wilson and Mike Love insisted that Brian focus his attention on producing work for the Beach Boys, according to various accounts. Wilson stated in a later interview, "Darlin was for Three Dog Night. They recorded it and said, 'No, you can have it' so I gave it to Carl to sing." Further recording on the track followed on October 27 and November 3.

"Darlin'" features a lead vocal by Carl Wilson. When asked what songs worked best for Carl Wilson's voice, Brian Wilson singled out the track, responding, "Wow, well 'Darlin'' of course, Carl did an amazing vocal on that song."

== Release ==
"Darlin'" was released as a single, backed with "Here Today", on December 18, 1967, the same date as the release of the Wild Honey album. It was the second single released from the album, after "Wild Honey". Upon its release, Cash Box said that the song represented "a shift in sound from the Beach Boys into a less elaborate but extra-commercial teen beat right between mid-and-up tempo. The deck's hard-throb rhythm and very fine group sound is complemented by a good set of teen-oriented lyrics to catch a maximum of exposure on the top pop programs. Instant breakout selection."

In England and several foreign markets, "Darlin'" was backed by the Wild Honey track "Country Air".

As predicted by Cash Box, "Darlin'" was a commercial uptick for the band, peaking at number 19 in the US Billboard Chart and number 11 in the UK Singles Chart. It has since appeared on several live and compilation albums.

== Reception and legacy ==
Upon release, Rolling Stone wrote in a review of the album, "Darlin'" is the song in which the Beach Boys really take R&B styling and make it work in an original way." Jazz & Pop's Gene Sculatti commented that "a whole lot of soul is used up" on the song.

Retrospectively, biographer Mark Dillon said the song was "ahead of its time, anticipating the blue-eyed soul of such '70s acts as Todd Rundgren and Chicago." Matthew Greenwald of AllMusic wrote of the song, "Loaded with simple emotions and sentimentality, it's a luscious piece of late-'60s pop, and not unlike the finer efforts of groups like the Turtles' 'Happy Together' and Buffalo Springfield's 'On the Way Home'." Rolling Stone readers ranked the song seventh on their vote for the top ten best Beach Boys deep cuts, while writers for The Guardian and uDiscoverMusic ranked the song 24th and 13th respectively on their lists of the best Beach Boys songs. It has been regarded as one of the band's finest songs, and a live staple.

Asked in 2015 for his favorite ever song that he had written, Wilson cited "Darlin'" and explained, "I just like the melody."

== In popular culture ==
- French rock trio Darlin' took their name from the song. Two of its members later reformed as the electronic music duo Daft Punk, and the third joined pop band Phoenix.
- The song features in the 2015 The Big Bang Theory episode, "The Earworm Reverberation", where this song becomes an earworm to Sheldon. He later remembers this song which is significant because it is about Amy and the impact she has had on his life.

== Personnel ==
Per John Brode, Will Crerar, Joshilyn Hoisington, and Craig Slowinski.

The Beach Boys

- Al Jardine - backing vocals
- Bruce Johnston - backing vocals
- Mike Love - backing vocals
- Brian Wilson - backing vocals, grand piano, tambourine
- Carl Wilson - lead and backing vocals, bass guitar
- Dennis Wilson - backing vocals

Additional players

- Harold Billings - trombone
- Hal Blaine - drums
- Virgil Evans - trumpet
- Billy Hinsche - backing vocals
- Lew McCreary - trombone
- Jay Migliori - baritone saxophone
- Ollie Mitchell - trumpet
- Unknown - tambourine, castanets, snare drum

== Cover versions ==
"Thinkin' 'Bout You Baby"

- 1972 – American Spring, Spring
- 1993 – BMX Bandits, Kylie's Got A Crush On Us

"Darlin'"

- 1968 – Paper Dolls, Paper Dolls House
- 1971 – Herb Alpert & the Tijuana Brass, Summertime
- 1975 – David Cassidy, The Higher They Climb (w/Bruce Johnston)
- 1977 – Paul Davis, Singer Of Songs, Teller Of Tales
- 1978 – Triumvirat, A la Carte
- 1984 – Tatsuro Yamashita, Big Wave
- 1991 – The Records, Smiles, Vibes & Harmony: A Tribute to Brian Wilson
- 1993 – Darlin', Shimmies in Super 8
- 2017 – Mike Love featuring AJR, Unleash the Love
- 2022 – Sweet Trip, Seen / Unseen
- 2022 – She & Him, Melt Away: A Tribute to Brian Wilson

== Charts ==
The Beach Boys version
Chart (1967–68)	Peak position
Australia (Kent Music Report)	28
New Zealand (Listener)	10
Netherlands	17
Switzerland	15
UK Singles (OCC)	11
U.S. Billboard Hot 100	19
U.S. Cash Box Top 100	10
U.S. Record World	17

David Cassidy version
Chart (1976)	Peak position
Ireland (IRMA)	20
South Africa (Springbok)	1
UK Singles (OCC)	16

Paul Davis version
Chart (1978)	Peak position
Canada RPM Top Singles	37
U.S. Billboard Hot 100	51
U.S. Cash Box Top 100	45

Yipes! version
Chart (1980)	Peak position
U.S. Billboard Hot 100	68

== Bibliography ==
- Badman, Keith (2004). The Beach Boys: The Definitive Diary of America's Greatest Band, on Stage and in the Studio. Backbeat Books. ISBN 978-0-87930-818-6.
- Dillon, Mark (2012). Fifty Sides of the Beach Boys: The Songs That Tell Their Story. ECW Press. ISBN 978-1-77090-198-8.
- Fine, Jason (2004). "The Beach Boys". In Brackett, Nathan; Hoard, Christian (eds.). The New Rolling Stone Album Guide (4th ed.). Simon & Schuster. ISBN 0-7432-0169-8.
- Gaines, Steven (1986). Heroes and Villains: The True Story of The Beach Boys. New York: Da Capo Press. ISBN 0306806479.
- Matijas-Mecca, Christian (2017). The Words and Music of Brian Wilson. ABC-CLIO. ISBN 978-1-4408-3899-6.
- Priore, Domenic (2005). Smile: The Story of Brian Wilson's Lost Masterpiece. Domenic Priore. ISBN 978-1-78323-198-0.
