= Wild Honey (album) =

Studio album by the Beach Boys
- Released: December 18, 1967
- Recorded: September 26 – November 15, 1967
- Studios: Beach Boys and Wally Heider, Los Angeles
- Genres: Soul; R&B; lo-fi; pop rock
- Length: 23:54
- Label: Capitol
- Producer: The Beach Boys

The Beach Boys chronology
Smiley Smile (1967)	Wild Honey (1967)	Friends (1968)

Singles from Wild Honey
- 1. "Wild Honey" Released: October 23, 1967; 2. "Darlin'" Released: December 18, 1967

Wild Honey is the thirteenth studio album by the American rock band the Beach Boys, released on December 18, 1967, by Capitol Records. Recorded between September and November, it was the group's first foray into soul music, influenced by the R&B of Motown and Stax Records, and their second album to credit production collectively to the band. It continued the lo-fi style of Smiley Smile.

Following the recording of an attempted live album (Lei'd in Hawaii), the Beach Boys had been inspired to regroup as a self-contained rock band, partly in response to critical assertions that they were "ball-less choir boys", and purposely distanced themselves from prevailing rock trends. Brian Wilson ceded some of his role in the production to Carl Wilson, a trend that continued on subsequent records. Mike Love also returned as Brian's main songwriting collaborator for the first time since Summer Days (And Summer Nights!!) in 1965. Wild Honey became the band's worst-selling album at that point, charting at number 24 in the U.S. Lead single "Wild Honey" peaked at number 31, while its follow-up "Darlin'" reached number 19. Most critics dismissed or declined to review the album. In the UK, it peaked at number seven.

In later years, a greater appreciation formed around the album's simplicity and charm; it has been credited with presaging a back-to-basics approach adopted by contemporaries including Bob Dylan and the Beatles, and with pioneering the DIY pop genre. In 1979, the track "Here Comes the Night" was redone by the group as a disco single. In 2020, Wild Honey was ranked number 410 on Rolling Stone's list of the “500 Greatest Albums of All Time”. A remixed and expanded edition, titled 1967 – Sunshine Tomorrow, was released in 2017 and contained the album's first stereo mix.

== Background ==
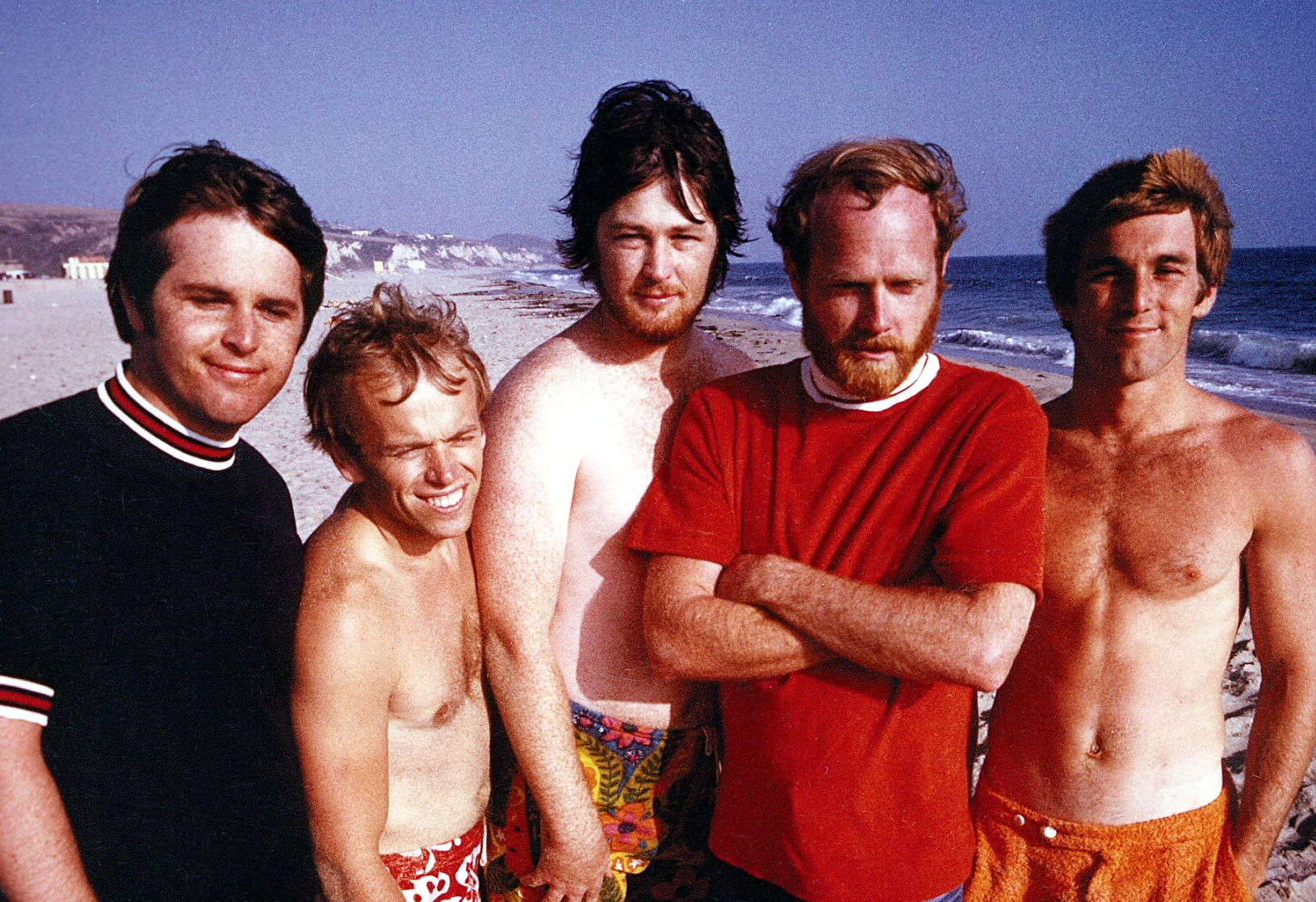
The Beach Boys in July 1967. From left: Carl Wilson, Al Jardine, Brian Wilson, Mike Love, and Dennis Wilson.

The Beach Boys' previous LP Smiley Smile, released in September 1967, peaked at number 41 on US Billboard charts for what was their worst performing album to date. A controversy involving whether the band was to be taken as a serious rock group had critics and fans divided, as journalist Gene Sculatti wrote at the time, "the California sextet is simultaneously hailed as genius incarnate and derided as the archetypical pop music copouts." The unfinished album that Smiley Smile came to replace, Smile, had acquired considerable press, and Capitol Records was still interested in putting the album out. In July 1967, an internal memo circulated around Capitol Records that discussed imminent plans to follow up Smiley Smile with a 10-track version of the original Smile, but this never came to fruition.

Instead, the group traveled to Honolulu and attempted to record a live album, titled Lei'd in Hawaii. There, Wilson intimated to a reporter that he enjoyed the contemporary "pop scene" and acknowledged that, even though "the Beach Boys are squares", he did not feel personally hurt by such a reputation, citing the band's past successes and the enjoyment they get from recording. However, Carl Wilson later said that Wild Honey was partly conceived as a response to criticisms against the band for "sounding like choir boys". He recalled, "there was one review that said Brian actually sounded like Mickey Mouse. That really tore him up." Upon their return to Los Angeles, in September, the group decided that the recordings were not suitable for release and attempted to redo the project as a live-in-the-studio album. After this, the band recorded the material that formed Wild Honey.

Meanwhile, two days after the release of Smiley Smile, Carl had produced some recordings for the songwriter Stephen Kalinich, who later became a collaborator for the group, and the songwriter's partner Mark Buckingham. All of the tracks remain unreleased. In October, Murry Wilson, the band's original manager, made his recording debut with the album The Many Moods of Murry Wilson, with one track composed by Al Jardine and produced by an uncredited Brian. (Note: During the next month, Murry embarked on a month-long tour of Europe and the UK to promote the album. He opined to a Melody Maker reporter that the Beach Boys would "never, ever in the foreseeable future be as big as The Beatles, even though this year alone they were the biggest money-earning group in the country." He similarly told Britain's Disc & Music Echo that "after 'Good Vibrations' Brian lost a lot of confidence. He didn't think he could ever write anything as good as that again [...] With [my] LP I'm going to nudge my boys' competitive spirit.")

== Style and production ==
Wild Honey was very simply music to cool out by. Brian was still very spaced out, though I seem to recall he'd given up acid by that time. [...] But we all really dug Motown, so Brian reckoned we should get more into a white R&B bag. I also recall around that time the band, and Brian in particular, getting criticized very heavily for sounding like choir boys.

— Carl Wilson, 1976

Wild Honey is a soul album that mixes pop and R&B styles. (Note: Billboard has also referred to it as a pop rock record.) According to Mike Love, the band made a conscious decision to be "completely out of the mainstream for what was going on at that time, which was all hard rock/psychedelic music. [The album] just didn't have anything to do with what was going on." Brian said, "we decided to make a rhythm'n'blues record. We consciously made a simpler album. It was just a little R'n'B and soul. It certainly wasn't like a regular Beach Boys record." It was recorded mostly at the band's private studio—located in Brian's home—and may be retrospectively viewed as the second installment in a consecutive series of lo-fi Beach Boys albums. The recording sessions lasted only several weeks, compared to the several months required for their 1966 hit "Good Vibrations". Musicologist Christian Matijas-Mecca noted that "while the album's sparse production aesthetics and stripped-down sonic palette are deceiving, the album is arranged with an attention to detail and tonal clarity."

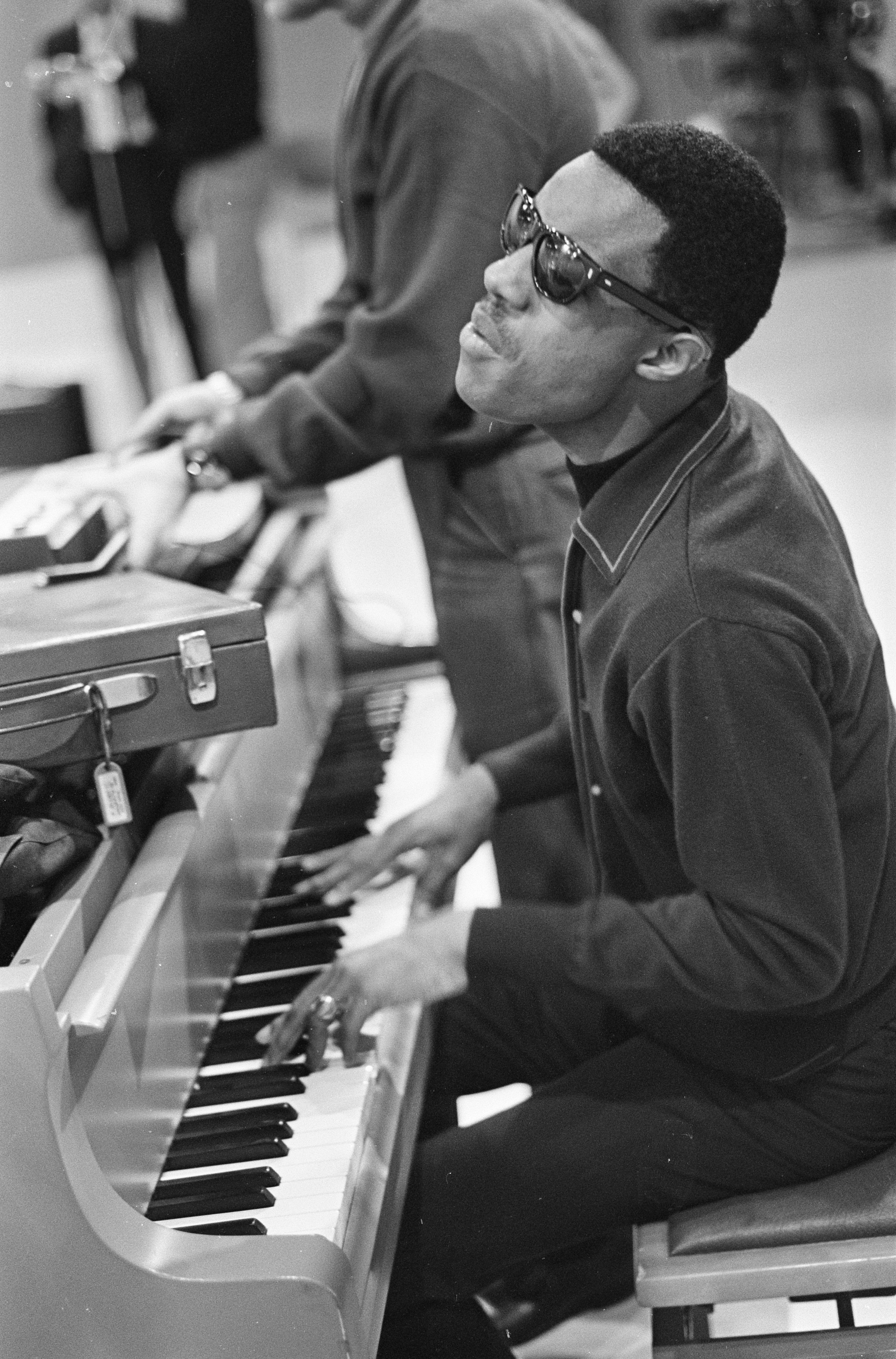
Wild Honey was heavily influenced by acts such as Stevie Wonder

The album differs in many ways from previous Beach Boys records. Unlike the band's previous R&B outings—which typically consisted of Chuck Berry-derived riffs—most of Wild Honey drew on the emotive soul music associated with the Motown and Stax Records labels. Edwin Faust from Stylus Magazine wrote that its music focuses "simply on catchy hooks, snappy melodies and a straight-up boogie-woogie feel". Lenny Kaye, writing for Wondering Sound, felt that its "R&B leanings" may be attributed to Mike Love and Carl Wilson's vocal roles on the album. Carl said that his R&B side had "always wanted to come out. I have this massive collection of R&B records. When we were doing Pet Sounds, I'd go home and put on my Stax and Aretha stuff. It's always been a big part of my life."

Wild Honey contains very little group singing compared to previous albums, and mainly features Brian singing at his piano. Musicologist Daniel Harrison writes that its "simple songs" lack the "enigmatic weirdness" and "virtuosic mesmerizers" present in Smiley Smile, although they feature the same production approach and similar core instrumental combo of organ, honky-tonk piano, and electric bass. The piano was slightly detuned, which Brian said made it "more like a twelve-string guitar, to get a more mellow sound. [...] I loved what it did to the sound of the record." Only three tracks were recorded with assistance from session musicians: "Wild Honey", "Aren't You Glad", and "Darlin'". Some sessions were held at Wally Heider Recording in Los Angeles in order to accommodate the musicians with a larger recording space for overdubs.

Bruce Johnston recalled, "we wanted to be a band again. The whole [Smile] thing had wiped everyone out, and we wanted to play together again." (Note: The last time the Beach Boys had an album where they essentially played as a self-contained band was 1964's Shut Down Volume 2.) Harrison describes Wild Honey as a self-conscious attempt by the Beach Boys to "regroup" themselves as a rock band in opposition to their more orchestral affairs of the past. By this time, Brian had grown weary of producing the Beach Boys after having done it for several years, and so he requested that Carl contribute more to the process. Brian stated that his brother "really got into [...] the production side of things" starting with Wild Honey. Moreover, Brian said, "People expected me to come up with great orchestral stuff all the time and it became a burden." He is credited as composer or co-composer for 9 of 11 tracks, compared to Smiley Smile in which he held a songwriting credit for every track. It was the Beach Boys' last album to be mixed in mono.

== Songs ==
=== Side one ===
"Wild Honey" was co-written by Mike Love from the perspective of Stevie Wonder singing it. Session musician Paul Tanner was recruited to play his Electro-Theremin on the track.

"Aren't You Glad" is a song that critics have compared to the style of the Lovin' Spoonful. Biographer Byron Preiss wrote that it "epitomizes" the album's "simple energy", while magazine editor Gene Sculatti says it "achieves a Miracles style smoothness via a Bobby Goldsboro-type song".

"I Was Made to Love Her" was originally recorded by Wonder, who had a number 2 hit with the song in July 1967. A popular misconception is that Carl sings the phrase "son of a bitch" on this track.

"Country Air" describes the scene of the sun rising over rural America. The group repeatedly harmonizes in the chorus, "Get a breath of that country air / breathe the beauty of it everywhere"." It was cited by Brian as his "favorite cut on the record." There is a technical anomaly with the master tape that caused the track to have a buzzing noise throughout.

"A Thing or Two" is identified by Christian Matijas-Mecca as a "sibling" to Smiley Smile's "Gettin' Hungry". The vocal riff would be reprised in the group's 1968 single "Do It Again".

=== Side two ===
"Darlin'" is a song that had been reworked from an earlier Brian Wilson/Mike Love composition, "Thinkin' 'Bout You Baby". Initially, Brian had planned to give "Darlin'" (along with "Time to Get Alone") to Three Dog Night, then called "Redwood", before Carl and Love insisted that Brian focus his attention on producing work for the Beach Boys. Redwood's version of "Time to Get Alone" was released on the 1993 compilation Celebrate: The Three Dog Night Story.

"I'd Love Just Once to See You" prefigured the writing style that Brian would later explore in the next studio album Friends. Throughout the song, he sings about ordinary activities such as washing the dishes, before ending it with the line, "I'd love just once to see you / in the nude".

"Here Comes the Night" is another soulful R&B song written by Brian Wilson and Mike Love. In 1979, the Beach Boys would make a near eleven-minute disco cover of this song for their twenty-third studio album, L.A. (Light Album).

"Let the Wind Blow" was the first composition recorded by the group that is in 3/4 time from beginning to end. According to biographers Andrew Doe and John Tobler, it was composed primarily by Love and "rearranged" by Brian.

"How She Boogaloed It" is one of the album's more uptempo songs. It was the first original Beach Boys song (excluding instrumentals and cover versions) not to feature contributions from Brian.

"Mama Says" is a chant that originated from an unreleased version of the Smile song "Vegetables". It was the first time a track linked to Smile was used to close a later Beach Boys album, the others being 20/20 (1969), Sunflower (1970) and Surf's Up (1971). Inexplicably, when the alternate "Mama Says" version of "Vegetables" was released, Van Dyke Parks' songwriting credit was not honored, and instead Love was listed as the song's only co-writer.

=== Leftover ===
Outtakes from the Wild Honey sessions include the originals "Can't Wait Too Long", "Time to Get Alone", "Cool, Cool Water", "Honey Get Home", and "Lonely Days"."Can't Wait Too Long" was released on the 1990/2001 two-fer reissue, while "Time to Get Alone" and "Cool, Cool Water" were released on subsequent albums 20/20 and Sunflower respectively. A solo recording of Brian performing the Smile song "Surf's Up" was lost and rediscovered several decades later at the end of the multi-track reel for "Country Air". Archivist Mark Linett stated: "No explanation for why he did that and it was never taken any farther. Although I don't think the intention was to take it any farther because it's just him singing live and playing piano." This recording would see release on the 2011 compilation The Smile Sessions. The band also recorded cover versions of the Box Tops hit "The Letter" (1967), Clint Ballard Jr.'s "The Game of Love" (1965), and the Beatles' "With a Little Help from My Friends" (1967), as well as Johnston's demo for "Bluebirds over the Mountain". The New York Observer's Ron Hart said that the significance of the Beach Boys covering "The Letter" as sung by Alex Chilton is "simply beyond comprehension [...] for that special kind of music nerd."

On October 13, 1967, Capitol announced that the Beach Boys' next release would be Wild Honey and offered its track listing, even though some of the songs had yet to be recorded at that point. (Note: The songs that were listed that had not yet been recorded were "Here Comes the Night", "Let the Wind Blow", "A Thing or Two", "I Was Made to Love Her", "Lonely Days", and "Cool, Cool Water".) Among its differences, "How She Boogalooed It", "Country Air", and "Mama Says" were not included, while "Cool, Cool Water", "Game of Love", "The Letter" (live version from Hawaii), and "Lonely Days" were. "Honey Get Home" was also listed, but crossed out. "The Letter" was to serve as a teaser for the forthcoming live album before the plans for the record were dropped.

== Cover and title ==
The image on the front of the Wild Honey sleeve is a small section of an elaborate stained-glass window that adorned Brian's home in Bel Air.

In the liner notes, friend Arnie Geller and the Wilsons' cousin Steve Korthoff wrote, "Honey, of the wild variety, on a shelf in Brian's kitchen, was not only an aide to all of the Beach Boys' health but the source of inspiration for the record, Wild Honey". Three Dog Night singer Danny Hutton supported, "The vibe was still great. [Brian would] have me over and he'd suddenly say: 'I've got this idea, man!' Then he'd point to a jar of wild honey. 'That's it! That's what the album's gonna be called!' And the other guys were thrilled."

Alternatively, Mike Love said he originated the title after finding a jar of honey in Wilson's cupboard. He felt that the title was suggestive of both edible honey and "honey" as a term of endearment, Wilson recalled in a 2012 interview, "People still think this record came about because of some wild honey I'm supposed to have kept in my kitchen, but I don't remember that being true."

== Release ==
Lead single "Wild Honey" was issued on October 23, 1967, with a B-side taken from Smiley Smile, "Wind Chimes". The single peaked at number 31 in the US and number 20 in the UK. From November 17 to 26, the touring group embarked on their fifth annual Thanksgiving tour of the US, with set lists that included four songs from the upcoming album: "Wild Honey", "Darlin'", "Country Air", and "How She Boogalooed It". Keyboardist Daryl Dragon and bassist Ron Brown supported the band on stage. On December 15, the band performed their only studio-televised live performance of the year at a UNICEF Variety Gala in Paris, for a program titled Gala Variety from Paris, which also featured several other celebrities, including Maharishi Mahesh Yogi.

Wild Honey was issued in the US on December 18, accompanied by the single "Darlin'" (backed with "Here Today" from Pet Sounds). It was released at a contrast to the psychedelic music that occupied the record charts, and in competition with the Beatles' Magical Mystery Tour and the Rolling Stones' Their Satanic Majesties Request. Wild Honey became the Beach Boys' lowest-selling album at that point and remained on the charts for only 15 weeks. "Darlin'" peaked at number 24 in the US, as did Wild Honey. When the single was reissued in January with the B-side "Country Air", it peaked at number 11. In March, Wild Honey was released in the UK, where it peaked at number 7.

== Critical reception ==
=== Contemporary ===
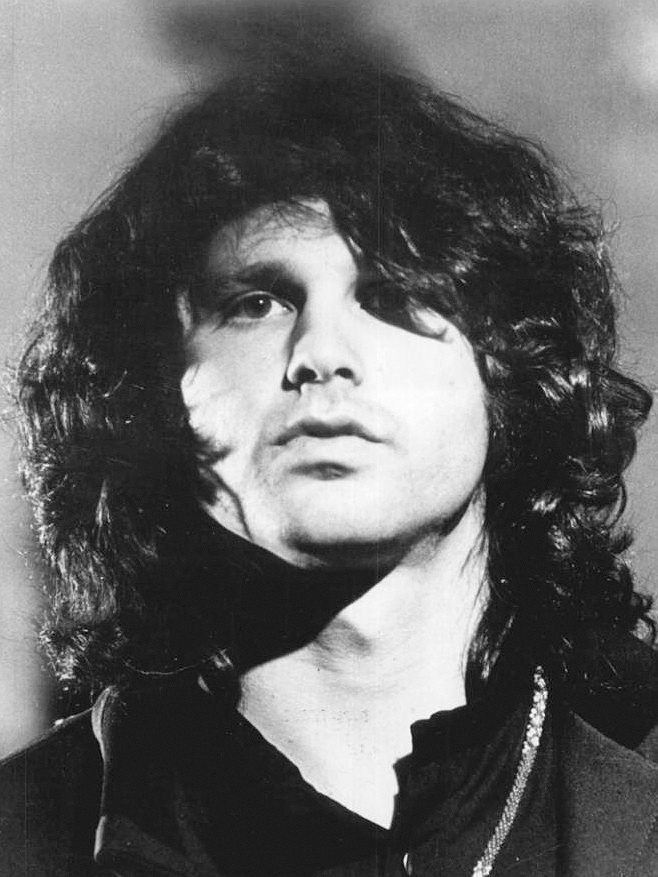
Wild Honey was reportedly one of Jim Morrison's favorite albums.

Like Smiley Smile, Wild Honey was viewed by contemporary critics as an inconsequential work, and it alienated audiences whose expectations had been raised by the hype generated for Smile, although received better reviews than Smiley Smile and was considered in some parts an improvement. The group remained effectively blacklisted by the music press, to the extent that reviews of the group's records were either withheld from publication or published long after the release dates. Writing in his 1969 book Outlaw Blues, Paul Williams summarized that Wild Honey was "a work of joy [...] new and fresh and raw and beautiful", and said that while the album's boogie woogie piano riffs were, "in their own way, as inventive as Brian's more textured records [...] we expected more (from Brian) than we would expect from any other composer alive, because the tracks we'd heard from Smile were just that good. Smiley Smile was [...] a confusion [...] and Wild Honey is just another Beach Boys record."

Rolling Stone reviewed that the Beach Boys regained their better judgement after the "disaster" of Smiley Smile, although their use of "pre-existing ideas and idioms" on Wild Honey is less satisfactory and original than their earlier work: "It's kind of amusing that the Beach Boys are suddenly re-discovering rhythm and blues five years after the Beatles and Stones had brought it all back home". Jazz & Pop's Gene Sculatti wrote: "[the Beach Boys] have the audacity to fool around with r&b, a territory indeed alien to them. Surprisingly, Wild Honey works well. It isn't the least bit pretentious, it's honest, and convincing." In a column for Esquire, Robert Christgau wrote that the album "epitomizes Brian Wilson", including the song "I'd Love Just Once to See You", which "expresses perfectly his quiet, thoughtful, sentimental artistic personality." Billboard welcomed the band's return to form after the "avant-garde" Smiley Smile, but was critical of "How She Boogalooed It" as "far below the group's quality" and predicted that "I'd Love Just Once to See You" would not receive airplay.

Disc & Music Echo awarded the album "LP of the Month" and wrote that it was the band's best since Pet Sounds. The magazine concluded that "Others who, like us, felt Brian Wilson was becoming bogged down in his complex arrangements can relax and listen to the most refreshing sounds for many months." In a 1968 Crawdaddy! article, David Anderle reported that the Doors' Jim Morrison considered Brian Wilson "his favorite musician" and Wild Honey "one of his favorite albums. [...] he really got into it."

=== Retrospective ===
Retrospective professional reviews
Review scores
Source	Rating
AllMusic	4/5 stars
Blender	5/5 stars
The Encyclopedia of Popular Music	3/5 stars
MusicHound Rock	4.5/5 stars
Pitchfork	3.5/10
The Rolling Stone Album Guide	4/5 stars
Sputnikmusic	3.5/5
The Village Voice	A+

Like Smiley Smile, Wild Honey was later reevaluated by fans and critics who highlighted the record for its simplicity and charm, particularly after the LP was reissued by Warner Bros. in 1974. In his 1971 review of Surf's Up, Rolling Stone's Arthur Schmidt referred to Wild Honey as "a masterpiece", "the most underrated" of the band's "post-surfer LPs", and "the last time they truly rocked their asses off, one cut after another." In a 1976 retrospective guide to 1967 for The Village Voice, Christgau felt Wild Honey is "so slight" but "perfect and full of pleasure". He argued that, "almost without a bad second", the album conveys "the troubled innocence of the Beach Boys through a time of attractive but perilous psychedelic sturm und drang. Its method is whimsy, candor, and carefully modulated amateurishness, all of which comes through as humor." (Note: In 1978, he ranked Wild Honey number 10 on his list of the best rock albums and later included in it in his "Basic Record Library" of 1950s and 1960s recordings, published in Christgau's Record Guide: Rock Albums of the Seventies (1981).)

Critic Geoffrey Himes called the record "10 wonderful celebrations of everyday life and a terrific Stevie Wonder cover. Wonder, though, never sang odes to clean air and refreshing wind or made boyish jokes about seeing a naked woman or brushing one's teeth." Record producer Tony Visconti listed Wild Honey as one of his 13 favorite albums and said that "I still refer to this record as a benchmark in the same way that I do Revolver." In 2020, Rolling Stone ranked the record at number 410 on its list of "The 500 Greatest Albums of All Time". It was also ranked second on Rolling Stone's 2012 list of the "Coolest Summer Albums of All Time" list, with the editors praising the record's "hedonistic rock & roll spirit", "humor" and "pensive depth".

Less favorably, Richie Unterberger wrote in his review for AllMusic that, apart from "Darlin'", "Here Comes the Night" and the title track, most of Wild Honey was "inessential". He found the music "often quite pleasant, for the great harmonies if nothing else, but the material and arrangements were quite simply thinner than they had been for a long time." Sommer wrote that the album's original mono mix suffers from being "flat and peculiar". In the lyrics to the Beta Band's 1999 song "Round the Bend", Wild Honey is hailed for its "funny little love songs" although considered "probably not as good as something like Pet Sounds".

In a negative review, Pitchfork critic Spencer Owen said only "one or two" songs succeed and the majority of Wild Honey is "not pretty" because of its R&B vein as "interpreted by white surfer boys", including "a Stevie Wonder cover sung with as much faux-soul as Carl Wilson could have possibly mustered". Writing in his Encyclopedia of Popular Music, Colin Larkin pairs the album with the "scrappy" Smiley Smile as two "hastily released" works that show how the Beach Boys' music had "lost its cohesiveness", with Brian Wilson's reduced involvement. Noel Gallagher, who considers the Beach Boys to be "the most vastly overrated band in the history of popular culture", named "How She Boogalooed It" among the group's only "six good tunes".

== Influence and legacy ==
=== Back-to-basics trend and DIY music ===
In the wake of Wild Honey, numerous contemporaries of the Beach Boys adopted a similar back-to-basics approach, including Bob Dylan (John Wesley Harding), the Band (Music from Big Pink), the Beatles (The Beatles), and the Rolling Stones (Beggars Banquet). Uncut's David Cavanaugh remarked that despite the poor critical response afforded to the album at the time of its release, Wild Honey heralded rock trends of the late 1960s and effectively pioneered "a post-psychedelic music while the Summer of Love was still in full swing. And wouldn't you know it, The Beatles' 'Lady Madonna' would get the credit." Author Mike Segretto echoed, "Ten days before Dylan got all the credit for popping the psychedelic balloon with John Wesley Harding, the Beach Boys had done it first with Wild Honey."

Similarly, music journalist Tim Sommer characterized the album as boldly subverting "rock's expansion into pompous avenues of volume, psychedelia and lyrical pretension" and called it a precursor to albums such as the Kinks' Village Green Preservation Society and the Byrds' The Notorious Byrd Brothers (both 1968). Editors at Rolling Stone credited the LP with starting "the idea of DIY pop".

=== 1967 – Sunshine Tomorrow ===
In 2017, a complete stereo mix of Wild Honey was released for the first time on the rarities compilation 1967 – Sunshine Tomorrow. The set also includes numerous session highlights, alternate takes, and live renditions of Wild Honey tracks in addition to other unreleased material recorded during the Smiley Smile and Lei'd in Hawaii era. Several months later, the compilation was followed with two more digital-exclusive releases: 1967 – Sunshine Tomorrow 2: The Studio Sessions and 1967 – Live Sunshine. They include more than 100 tracks that were left off the first compilation.

== Track listing ==
All tracks are written by Brian Wilson and Mike Love, except where noted.

Side one
No.	Title	Lead vocal(s)	Length
1.	"Wild Honey"	Carl Wilson with Brian Wilson	2:36
2.	"Aren't You Glad"	Mike Love and B. Wilson	2:15
3.	"I Was Made to Love Her" (Henry Cosby, Sylvia Moy, Lula Mae Hardaway, Stevland Morris)	C. Wilson	2:05
4.	"Country Air"	B. Wilson and C. Wilson with group	2:19
5.	"A Thing or Two"	Love and C. Wilson with Bruce Johnston	2:40
Total length:			11:55

Side two
No.	Title	Lead vocal(s)	Length
1.	"Darlin'"	C. Wilson	2:11
2.	"I'd Love Just Once to See You"	B. Wilson	1:48
3.	"Here Comes the Night"	B. Wilson	2:42
4.	"Let the Wind Blow"	Love and B. Wilson with C. Wilson	2:18
5.	"How She Boogalooed It" (Love, Bruce Johnston, Al Jardine, Carl Wilson)	C. Wilson	1:56
6.	"Mama Says"	group	1:04
Total length:			11:59

Smiley Smile / Wild Honey 1990/2001 CD reissue bonus tracks
No.	Title	Lead vocal(s)	Length
23.	"Heroes and Villains" (alternate take) (B. Wilson, Van Dyke Parks)	B. Wilson	3:00
24.	"Good Vibrations" (various sessions) (B. Wilson)	instrumental	6:57
25.	"Good Vibrations" (early take) (B. Wilson, Tony Asher)	C. Wilson with B. Wilson	3:03
26.	"You're Welcome" (B. Wilson)	group	1:11
27.	"Their Hearts Were Full of Spring" (Bobby Troup)	group	2:33
28.	"Can't Wait Too Long" (B. Wilson)	B. Wilson with C. Wilson	5:34

== Personnel ==
Credits per John Brode, Will Crerar, Joshilyn Hoisington, and Craig Slowinski.

The Beach Boys

- Al Jardine – unison (9) and backing vocals (3, 4, 6-8, 11), whistling (4), electric rhythm guitars (5), acoustic guitar (7), 12-string electric guitar (8)
- Bruce Johnston – lead (5), unison (9) and backing vocals (1, 2, 4-6, 11), Farfisa organ solo (1, 10), Baldwin organ (3), grand piano (3), bass guitar (1, 2, 9), hi-hat (3), handclaps (2)
- Mike Love – lead (2, 5, 9) and backing vocals (1-8, 11), whistling (4)
- Brian Wilson – lead (1, 2, 4, 7-9), unison (9) and backing vocals (all but 10), grand piano (1, 2, 4-6, 8, 9), grand piano (with taped strings) (2), Baldwin organ (2, 5, 8, 9), Farfisa organ (1), Chamberlin (4), bass guitar (4, 5), drums (2, 4), snare drum (8), hi-hat (5), sticks (7), handclaps (2), tambourine (1, 6), congas (1)
- Carl Wilson – lead (1, 3-6, 9, 10), unison (9) and backing vocals (all but 10), 12-string electric guitar (3, 8), electric guitars (2-5, 10), 12-string acoustic guitar (1), acoustic guitar (7, 9, 10), grand piano (3), 6-string bass guitar (10), bass guitar (3, 5-8), drums (10), snare drum (5), floor tom (5), handclaps (2), tambourine (3, 8), maracas (10)
- Dennis Wilson – backing vocals (1, 6), drums (1, 9), snare drum (3), floor tom (3), bongos (1), tambourine (3)

Additional musicians

- Arnold Belnick – violin (2)
- Harold Billings – trombone (6)
- Hal Blaine – drums (6)
- Norman Botnick – viola (2)
- David Burk – viola (2)
- Bonnie Douglas – violin (2)
- Virgil Evans – trumpet (6)
- Billy Hinsche – backing vocals (6)
- Lew McCreary – trombone (6)
- Jay Migliori – baritone saxophone (6)
- Ollie Mitchell – trumpet (2, 7)
- Alexander Neiman – viola (2)
- Wilbert Nuttycombe – violin (2)
- Jerome Reisler – violin (2)
- Paul Shure – violin (2)
- Paul Tanner – Electro-Theremin (1)
- Anthony Terran – trumpet (2)
- Unknown – tambourine (6), castanets (6), snare drum (6), handclaps (10)

Production and technical staff

- The Beach Boys – producers
- Jim Lockert – engineer
- Bill Halverson – second engineer
- Stephen Desper – engineer on "Mama Says" (uncredited)

== Charts ==
Chart (1968)	Peak position
UK Albums Chart	7
US Billboard 200	24

Chart (2025)	Peak position
Greek Albums (IFPI) 2001 reissue	27

== Bibliography ==
- Badman, Keith (2004). The Beach Boys: The Definitive Diary of America's Greatest Band, on Stage and in the Studio. Backbeat Books. ISBN 978-0-87930-818-6.
- Carlin, Peter Ames (2006). Catch a Wave: The Rise, Fall, and Redemption of the Beach Boys' Brian Wilson. Rodale. ISBN 978-1-59486-320-2.
- Crowley, Kent (2015). Long Promised Road: Carl Wilson, Soul of the Beach Boys: The Biography (1st ed.). London, England: Jawbone Press. ISBN 9781908279842.
- Dillon, Mark (2012). Fifty Sides of the Beach Boys. Toronto, Ont.: ECW Press. ISBN 978-1-77090-198-8.
- Doe, Andrew; Tobler, John (2004). Brian Wilson and the Beach Boys: The Complete Guide to Their Music. Omnibus. ISBN 9781844494262.
- Fine, Jason (2004). The New Rolling Stone Album Guide (4th ed.). London: Simon & Schuster. ISBN 0-7432-0169-8.
- Gaines, Steven (1986). Heroes and Villains: The True Story of The Beach Boys (1. Da Capo Press ed.). New York: Da Capo Press. ISBN 0-306-80647-9.
- Harrison, Daniel (1997). "After Sundown: The Beach Boys' Experimental Music" (PDF). In Covach, John; Boone, Graeme M. (eds.). Understanding Rock: Essays in Musical Analysis. Oxford University Press. pp. 33–57. ISBN 978-0-19-988012-6. Archived (PDF) from the original on May 24, 2015.
- Hodgkins, Nig (1996). Buckley, Jonathan (ed.). Rock: The Rough Guide (1st ed.). London: Rough Guides. ISBN 1-85828-201-2.
- Lambert, Philip (2007). Inside the Music of Brian Wilson: The Songs, Sounds, and Influences of the Beach Boys' Founding Genius. Bloomsbury Publishing. ISBN 978-1-4411-0748-0.
- Larkin, Colin, ed. (2006). The Encyclopedia of Popular Music (4th ed.). London: Oxford University Press. ISBN 978-0-19-531373-4.
- Leaf, David (1985). The Beach Boys. Courage Books. ISBN 0-89471-412-0.
- Matijas-Mecca, Christian (2017). The Words and Music of Brian Wilson. ABC-CLIO. ISBN 978-1-4408-3899-6.
- Preiss, Byron (1979). The Beach Boys. New York: Ballantine Books. ISBN 978-0-345-27398-7.
- Segretto, Mike (2022). 33 1/3 Revolutions Per Minute: A Critical Trip Through the Rock LP Era, 1955–1999. Rowman & Littlefield. ISBN 9781493064601.
- Schinder, Scott (2007). "The Beach Boys". In Schinder, Scott; Schwartz, Andy (eds.). Icons of Rock: An Encyclopedia of the Legends Who Changed Music Forever. Westport, Connecticut: Greenwood Press. ISBN 978-0-313-33845-8.
- Tobler, John (1978). The Beach Boys. Chartwell Books. ISBN 0890091749.
- Wilson, Brian; Greenman, Ben (2016). I Am Brian Wilson: A Memoir. Da Capo Press. ISBN 978-0-306-82307-7.
