= Their Hearts Were Full of Spring =

Song
- Songwriter(s): Bobby Troup

"Their Hearts Were Full of Spring" is a song written by Bobby Troup. It has been recorded by many artists including Jimmie Rodgers, the Four Freshmen, the Lettermen, the Beach Boys, Sue Raney, the Cyrkle, and Tatsuro Yamashita.

== The Beach Boys versions ==
The song was a favorite of American rock band the Beach Boys. Throughout their career, they performed it regularly, taking the song's vocal arrangement from the Four Freshmen. In 1963, they released their own version with revised lyrics by Mike Love as "A Young Man is Gone" in tribute to actor James Dean. It can be heard in their album Little Deuce Coupe (1963). They later released a live version of "Their Hearts Were Full of Spring" for Live in London (1969). In 1990, a studio recording of the song made in 1967 was released as a bonus track for the Capitol Records reissue of Wild Honey (1967).
