= Gene Sculatti =

American music journalist (born 1947)

- Born: Eugene Paul Sculatti; January 30, 1947 (age 79); San Francisco, California, U.S.
- Occupation: Music journalist

Eugene Paul Sculatti (born January 30, 1947) is an American music journalist who compiled and edited the book The Catalog of Cool (1982). In 1966, he became the first journalist to write about the nascent San Francisco music scene in a national magazine (Crawdaddy!). He is formerly an editorial director for Warner Bros. Records and the magazine Billboard. He has also written for Rolling Stone, Creem, and Radio & Records.

Sculatti is also a folk artist whose Cityscape series of hand-drawn scrolls has been featured in the UK's Raw Vision, an international journal of Outsider Art.

== Bibliography ==
- 1982 The Catalog of Cool. New York. Warner Books. ISBN 978-0-446-37515-3
- 1984 Popcorn: America's Amazing Obsession. New York. Long Shadow Books / Simon & Schuster. ISBN 978-0-671-49682-1
- 1985 San Francisco Nights: The Psychedelic Music Trip 1965-1968. New York. St. Martin's Press. ISBN 978-0-312-69903-1
- 1993 Too Cool. New York. St. Martin's Press. ISBN 978-0-312-69903-1
- 2004 Best Selling Albums of the 60s. London. Barnes & Noble / Amber Books. ISBN 978-1-906842-04-8
- 2012 Dark Stars & Anti-Matter: 40 Years of Loving, Leaving and Making Up with the Music of the Grateful Dead. Rhino. ASIN: B008A8NX2G
- 2016 Tryin' to Tell a Stranger 'bout Rock and Roll: Selected Writings 1966-2016. ISBN 978-1-5354-8382-7
- 2021 For the Records: Close Encounters with Popular Music.
