= Feel Flows (album) =

Feel Flows: The Sunflower & Surf's Up Sessions 1969–1971

Compilation album and box set by the Beach Boys
- Released: August 27, 2021
- Recorded: November 4, 1966 – November 26, 1993
- Genres: Pop; rock
- Length: 6:32:55
- Label: Capitol/UME
- Producers: The Beach Boys, Terry Jacks, Rick Henn, Murry Wilson, David Sandler (original recordings); Mark Linett, Alan Boyd (compilation)

The Beach Boys chronology
1969: I'm Going Your Way (2019)	Feel Flows: The Sunflower & Surf's Up Sessions 1969–1971 (2021)	Sail On Sailor – 1972 (2022)

Feel Flows: The Sunflower & Surf's Up Sessions 1969–1971 is an expanded reissue of the albums Sunflower (1970) and Surf's Up (1971) by American rock band the Beach Boys. It was released by Capitol/UME on August 27, 2021 and was produced by Mark Linett and Alan Boyd. Feel Flows is the band's first major archival release since Wake the World and I Can Hear Music in 2018, and the first issued on physical media since Sunshine Tomorrow in 2017. The title is taken from the Surf's Up track "Feel Flows".

Four separate editions of the compilation were made available: a five-CD box set, a two-CD set, a double vinyl set, and a quadruple vinyl set. The box set includes remastered editions of the Sunflower and Surf's Up albums alongside 108 previously unreleased tracks, the majority of which are session highlights, alternate versions, and alternate mixes (including instrumental and a cappella mixes). Feel Flows also includes live performances, radio promos, and outtakes not originally included on either album, as well as several tracks drawn from Dennis Wilson's aborted first solo album, Poops/Hubba Hubba.

Feel Flows received largely positive reviews. Criticism was reserved for the poor mastering quality, particularly with respect to the presence of digital artifacts, excessive treble, and extreme dynamic range compression. It peaked at number 83 in the U.S and number 19 in the UK while also reaching the top 20 on record charts in the Netherlands, Germany, and Scotland. A sequel compilation, Sail On Sailor – 1972, followed in 2022.

== Background ==
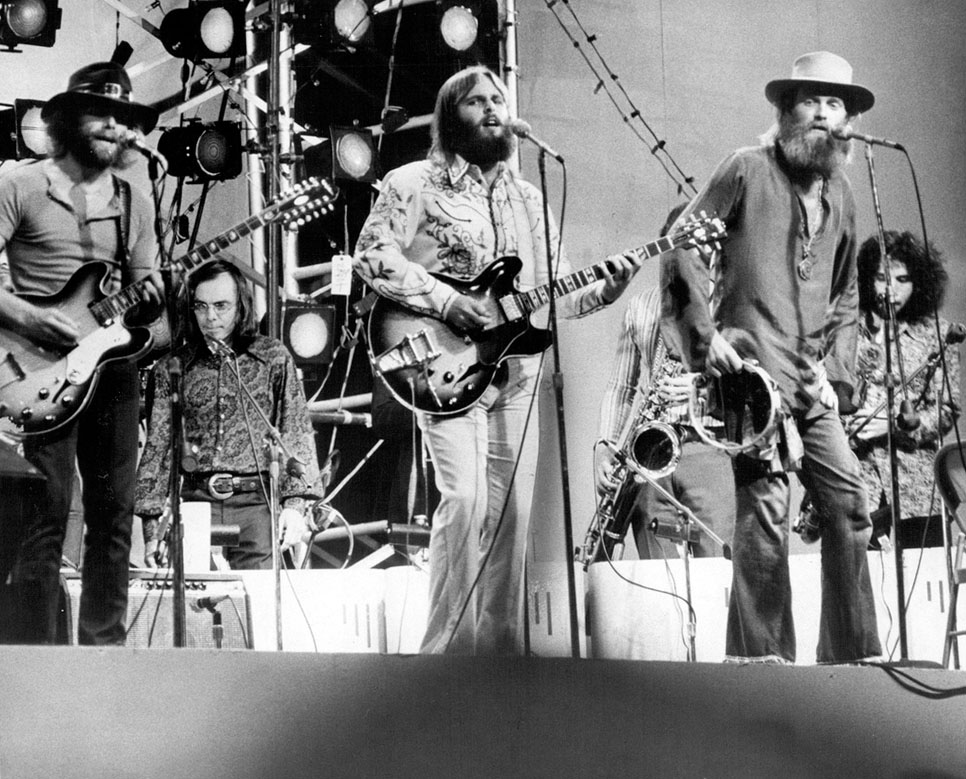
The Beach Boys performing at Central Park, 1971.

Feel Flows was produced by engineer Mark Linett and archive manager Alan Boyd. New interviews were conducted with Al Jardine, Bruce Johnston, Mike Love, and Brian Wilson for the liner notes. According to music critic Howie Edelson, he, Linett, and Boyd had "worked on it [since 2018]. Those two put the whole f ucking [sic] thing together. Hours and hours and hours and hours. As the official BRI consultant, I was asked my opinion throughout and consulted with brains and heart."

The compilation was assembled in four different formats: 5CD box, 2CD set, 4LP set and 2LP set. The box set includes a 48-page booklet, edited by Edelson, and newly remastered versions of Sunflower and Surf's Up along with 108 previously unreleased tracks. The majority of those tracks constitute session highlights, alternate versions, and alternate mixes (including instrumental and a capella mixes), with a lesser percentage reserved for live performances, radio promos, and outtakes not originally included on either album. Disc five includes several tracks drawn from Dennis Wilson's aborted solo album, Poops/Hubba Hubba, that he wrote with Beach Boys touring musician Daryl Dragon.

Studio recordings that had not seen release in any form include "'Til I Die" (piano demo), "Big Sur" (1970 version), "Sweet and Bitter", "My Solution", "Seasons in the Sun", "Baby Baby", "Awake", "It's a New Day", "Medley: All of My Love / Ecology", "Before", "Behold the Night", "Old Movie (Cuddle Up)", "Hawaiian Dream", "I've Got a Friend", "You Never Give Me Your Money", and "Won't You Tell Me" (demo).

Versions of "Marcella" and "You Need a Mess of Help to Stand Alone" were included as teasers for the next archival release, Sail On Sailor – 1972.

== Release ==
In December 2019, as part of their annual copyright extension releases, Capitol and UMG issued 1969: I'm Going Your Way, an EP that consisted of three unreleased tracks drawn from the Sunflower sessions: "I'm Going Your Way", "Slip On Through" (an alternate version), and "Carnival (Over the Waves)". Jardine and Johnston told fans that the EP may soon be followed with a more extensive release dedicated to Sunflower and Surf's Up. In February 2020, Linett stated that he hoped the set would be released in the autumn. "We're waiting on a release date. It's a large project, so it takes a bit of finesse to get it all done and approved, but we're still working on it." The set was reported complete in July.

Feel Flows had originally been ready for issue in 2020. Band insiders, including Edelson, later reported on a Beach Boys message board that the release had stalled for undisclosed reasons. Biographer Jon Stebbins wrote that the delay was due to a "a one or two man circular firing squad ... Look at the history of the band, the answer is obvious. Finding a way to f*** up a beautiful thing. It's in the DNA of the Beach Boys." According to reporter Joel Goldenberg, many fans speculated that Mike Love was responsible for stalling the compilation, and petitions that called for its release were posted online. At the time, the band were in the process of selling a majority stake in their intellectual property to Irving Azoff and his new company Iconic Artists Group.

In November 2020, a Beach Boys entry titled 1970 Release was uploaded to AllMusic's website containing 64 30-second samples of unreleased material and alternate mixes from the band's 1969 to 1970 period. The page was removed, although fans quickly reuploaded the samples to YouTube. On November 22, Jardine stated that the Feel Flows project currently had a tentative release date of May or June 2021. In March 2021, engineer Stephen Desper reported that the release date had been scheduled for July 2021. Love confirmed that the set would be released "pretty soon".

On June 2, 2021, the track listing leaked. Feel Flows was officially announced the next day, with a release date of July 30. "Big Sur" was issued in various formats to commemorate the announcement. On June 26, Feel Flows was once again delayed, this time to August 27. Edelson wrote that the reason was "[n]othing untoward, weird, or sinister -- just a scheduling thing, as is commonplace."

== Critical reception ==
Professional ratings
Aggregate scores
Source	Rating
Metacritic	87/100
Review scores
Source	Rating
AllMusic	4/5 stars
American Songwriter	4/5 stars
Mojo	4/5 stars
Pitchfork	8.0/10
Rolling Stone	4/5 stars
Uncut	9/10 or

At Metacritic, which assigns a normalized rating out of 100 to reviews from critics, Feel Flows received an average score of 87 based on 10 reviews, indicating "universal acclaim". Uncut's Rob Hughes wrote that Feel Flows contains "a trove of hidden revelations". Hughes highlighted the live tracks and Dennis' unreleased songs, concluding that "Feel Flows is emphatic proof that The Beach Boys never stopped making sublime, artful, spiritually invested music, no matter how far they'd fallen in popular opinion."

Reviewing the box set for Ultimate Classic Rock, Michael Gallucci decreed that Sunflower and Surf's Up were among the band's best albums and that there "aren't too many rough patches" spread across the bonus tracks. "Nothing here will attract listeners who think the Beach Boys faded into irrelevance after the mid-'60s, but fans will discover plenty of exceptional and unheard tracks from one of their most fertile and productive runs." AllMusic reviewer Fred Thomas felt, "Most casual listeners will be daunted by the depths to which the massive set travels, but it's must-hear material for the committed and the fascinated."

Paste's Robert Ham took issue with the overcompressed mixes and the presence of digital artifacts.

Where Feel Flows disappoints is in the mastering. It's unclear what the source was for these recordings, but it often sounds digital. And that leads to some ugly sibilant tones through some songs and a post-production loudness that does no favors to the more textural moments within.

== Track listing ==
=== 5-CD edition ===
==== Disc one ====
Sunflower 2019 remaster
No.	Title	Writer(s)	Length
1.	"Slip On Through"	Dennis Wilson, Gregg Jakobson	2:19
2.	"This Whole World"	Brian Wilson	1:58
3.	"Add Some Music to Your Day"	B. Wilson, Joe Knott, Mike Love	3:36
4.	"Got to Know the Woman"	Jakobson, D. Wilson	2:43
5.	"Deirdre"	B. Wilson, Bruce Johnston	3:30
6.	"It's About Time"	Bob Burchman, Carl Wilson, D. Wilson, Al Jardine	2:57
7.	"Tears in the Morning"	Johnston	4:07
8.	"All I Wanna Do"	B. Wilson, Love	2:36
9.	"Forever"	D. Wilson, Jakobson	2:42
10.	"Our Sweet Love"	C. Wilson, B. Wilson, Jardine	2:41
11.	"At My Window"	B. Wilson, Jardine	2:32
12.	"Cool, Cool Water"	B. Wilson, Love	5:03
13.	"Sunflower Promo 1" (previously unreleased)		0:59

Sunflower Live
No.	Title	Writer(s)	Recording date and venue	Length
14.	"This Whole World" (Live 1988)	B. Wilson	June 19, 1988 – Groton, Connecticut	2:10
15.	"Add Some Music To Your Day" (Live 1993)	B. Wilson, Knott, Love	November 26, 1993 – New York City	3:23
16.	"Susie Cincinnati" (Live 1976)	Jardine	July 3, 1976 – Anaheim, California	2:46
17.	"Back Home" (Live 1976)	B. Wilson, Bob Norberg	July 3, 1976 – Anaheim, California	3:15
18.	"It's About Time" (Live 1971)	Burchman, C. Wilson, D. Wilson, Jardine	July 2, 1971 – Central Park	3:45
19.	"Riot In Cell Block 9" (Live 1970)	Jerry Leiber, Mike Stoller	October 3, 1970 – Big Sur Folk Festival	3:34

Sunflower Bonus Tracks
No.	Title	Writer(s)	Producer(s)	Length
20.	"Break Away" (original 1969 single mix)	B. Wilson, Murry Wilson	B. Wilson, M. Wilson	2:55
21.	"Celebrate the News" (2020 mix, previously unreleased)	D. Wilson, Jakobson	D. Wilson	2:37
22.	"Loop De Loop" (1969 mix, previously unreleased)	C. Wilson, B. Wilson, Jardine	Jardine	2:59
23.	"San Miguel" (2020 mix, previously unreleased)	D. Wilson, Jakobson	D. Wilson	2:33
24.	"Susie Cincinnati" (2020 mix, previously unreleased)	Jardine	Jardine, B. Wilson	3:02
25.	"Good Time" (2019 mix, previously unreleased)	B. Wilson, Jardine	B. Wilson	2:56
26.	"Two Can Play" (2019 mix, previously unreleased)	B. Wilson	B. Wilson	2:06
27.	"Cotton Fields (The Cotton Song)" (2021 stereo mix, previously unreleased)	Huddie "Ledbelly" Ledbetter	Jardine	3:21

==== Disc two ====
Surf's Up 2019 remaster
No.	Title	Writer(s)	Length
1.	"Don't Go Near the Water"	Love, Jardine	2:41
2.	"Long Promised Road"	Jack Rieley, C. Wilson	3:32
3.	"Take a Load Off Your Feet"	B. Wilson, Gary Winfrey, Jardine	2:32
4.	"Disney Girls (1957)"	Johnston	4:08
5.	"Student Demonstration Time"	Stoller, Love, Leiber	3:59
6.	"Feel Flows"	C. Wilson, Rieley	4:44
7.	"Lookin' at Tomorrow (A Welfare Song)"	Winfrey, Jardine	1:57
8.	"A Day in the Life of a Tree"	Rieley, B. Wilson	3:09
9.	"'Til I Die"	B. Wilson	2:32
10.	"Surf's Up"	B. Wilson, Van Dyke Parks	4:14
11.	"Surf's Up Promo" (previously unreleased)		1:02

Surf's Up Live
No.	Title	Writer(s)	Recording date and venue	Length
12.	"Take a Load Off Your Feet" (Live 1993)	B. Wilson, Winfrey, Jardine	November 26, 1993 – New York City	2:35
13.	"Long Promised Road" (Live 1972)	Rieley, C. Wilson	November 23, 1972 – Carnegie Hall	4:14
14.	"Disney Girls" (Live 1982)	Johnston	June 11, 1982 – Blossom Music Center	4:23
15.	"Surf's Up" (Live 1973)	B. Wilson, Parks	August 15, 1973 – Chicago	4:58
16.	"Student Demonstration Time" (Live 1972)	Stoller, Love, Leiber	November 23, 1972 – Carnegie Hall	4:42

Surf's Up Bonus Tracks
No.	Title	Writer(s)	Producer(s)	Length
17.	"Big Sur" (previously unreleased)	Love	The Beach Boys	2:35
18.	"H.E.L.P. Is On the Way" (2019 mix, previously unreleased)	B. Wilson	B. Wilson	2:31
19.	"Sweet and Bitter" (previously unreleased)	B. Wilson, Don Goldberg	B. Wilson	2:33
20.	"My Solution" (previously unreleased)	B. Wilson	B. Wilson	3:44
21.	"4th of July" (2019 mix, previously unreleased)	D. Wilson, Rieley	D. Wilson	3:11
22.	"Sound of Free" (1970 single mix, 2019 master)	D. Wilson, Love	D. Wilson	2:22
23.	"Lady (Fallin' in Love)" (1970 mix, previously unreleased)	D. Wilson	D. Wilson	2:21
24.	"Seasons in the Sun" (previously unreleased)	Jacques Brel, Rod McKuen	Terry Jacks	3:27

==== Disc three ====
All subsequent tracks were previously unreleased.

Sunflower Sessions
No.	Title	Writer(s)	Producer(s)	Length
1.	"Sunflower Promo 2"		The Beach Boys	0:59
2.	"Slip On Through" (track and backing vocals)	D. Wilson, Jakobson	D. Wilson	2:47
3.	"This Whole World" (long version track and backing vocals)	B. Wilson	C. Wilson, B. Wilson	2:47
4.	"Add Some Music To Your Day" (track and backing vocals)	B. Wilson, Knott, Love	B. Wilson	4:35
5.	"Deirdre" (track)	B. Wilson, Johnston	Johnston	3:34
6.	"It's About Time" (track and backing vocals)	Burchman, C. Wilson, D. Wilson, Jardine	D. Wilson, C. Wilson	2:54
7.	"Tears In The Morning" (track and backing vocals)	Johnston	Johnston	4:08
8.	"All I Wanna Do" (session intro, track and backing vocals)	B. Wilson, Love	C. Wilson	3:46
9.	"Forever" (session highlights)	D. Wilson, Jakobson	D. Wilson, C. Wilson	3:36
10.	"Forever" (track and backing vocals)	D. Wilson, Jakobson	D. Wilson, C. Wilson	3:01
11.	"Our Sweet Love" (track and backing vocals)	C. Wilson, B. Wilson, Jardine	B. Wilson, C. Wilson	2:39
12.	"At My Window" (track and backing vocals)	B. Wilson, Jardine	Jardine	2:50
13.	"Cool, Cool Water" (alternate 2019 mix)	B. Wilson, Love	B. Wilson	6:24
14.	"San Miguel" (track and backing vocals)	D. Wilson, Jakobson	D. Wilson	2:57
15.	"Loop De Loop (Flip Flop Flyin' in an Aeroplane)" (track)	C. Wilson, B. Wilson, Jardine	Jardine	2:49
16.	"Good Time" (session intro, track and backing vocals)	B. Wilson, Jardine	B. Wilson	4:27
17.	"When Girls Get Together" (track)	B. Wilson, Love	B. Wilson	1:47
18.	"Slip On Through" (alternate 1969 mix with session intro)	D. Wilson, Jakobson	D. Wilson	3:25
19.	"Our Sweet Love" (string section)	C. Wilson, B. Wilson, Jardine	B. Wilson, C. Wilson	1:00

1969–1970 a Cappella
No.	Title	Writer(s)	Producer(s)	Length
20.	"San Miguel" (backing vocals excerpt)	D. Wilson, Jakobson	D. Wilson	1:00
21.	"Break Away (Tag)" (backing vocals excerpt)	B. Wilson, M. Wilson	B. Wilson, M. Wilson	0:18
22.	"Cotton Fields (The Cotton Song)" (a Cappella)	Ledbetter	Jardine	2:44
23.	"Good Time" (backing vocals excerpt)	B. Wilson, Jardine	B. Wilson	0:19
24.	"This Whole World" (backing vocals section)	B. Wilson	B. Wilson, C. Wilson	1:05
25.	"Add Some Music to Your Day" (a Cappella)	B. Wilson, Knott, Love	B. Wilson	3:30
26.	"Got to Know the Woman" (a Cappella)	Jakobson, D. Wilson	D. Wilson	2:52
27.	"It's About Time" (backing vocals excerpt)	Burchman, C. Wilson, D. Wilson, Jardine	D. Wilson, C. Wilson	0:50
28.	"All I Wanna Do" (a Cappella)	B. Wilson, Love	C. Wilson	2:58
29.	"Forever" (2019 a Cappella mix)	D. Wilson, Jakobson	D. Wilson, C. Wilson	2:52

==== Disc four ====
Surf's Up Sessions
No.	Title	Writer(s)	Producer(s)	Length
1.	"Don't Go Near The Water" (track and backing vocals)	Love, Jardine	Jardine, C. Wilson	3:45
2.	"Long Promised Road" (track and backing vocals)	Rieley, C. Wilson	C. Wilson	3:38
3.	"Take a Load Off Your Feet" (alternate vocal)	B. Wilson, Winfrey, Jardine	Jardine, B. Wilson	2:28
4.	"Disney Girls (1957)" (track and backing vocals)	Johnston	Johnston	4:17
5.	"Student Demonstration Time" (track and backing vocals)	Stoller, Love, Leiber	C. Wilson	3:45
6.	"Feel Flows" (track and backing vocals)	C. Wilson, Rieley	C. Wilson	5:02
7.	"Lookin' at Tomorrow (A Welfare Song)" (session intro and alternate mix)	Jardine, Winfrey	Jardine	2:43
8.	"A Day in the Life of a Tree" (track and backing vocals)	B. Wilson, Rieley	B. Wilson	2:55
9.	"'Til I Die" (long version with alternate lyrics)	B. Wilson	B. Wilson, C. Wilson	4:47
10.	"Surf's Up" (Brian Wilson lead vocal 2019 mix)	B. Wilson, Parks	B. Wilson, C. Wilson	4:08
11.	"(Wouldn't It Be Nice to) Live Again" (extended 2019)	D. Wilson, Stanley Shapiro	D. Wilson	6:50

Surf's Up a Cappella
No.	Title	Writer(s)	Producer(s)	Length
12.	"Don't Go Near The Water" (2020 a Cappella mix)	Love, Jardine	Jardine, C. Wilson	2:36
13.	"Long Promised Road" (a Cappella)	Rieley, C. Wilson	C. Wilson	4:00
14.	"Feel Flows" (backing vocal excerpt)	C. Wilson, Rieley	C. Wilson	0:33
15.	"Disney Girls" (backing vocal excerpt)	Johnston	Johnston	0:36
16.	"A Day In The Life of a Tree" (backing vocal excerpt)	Rieley, B. Wilson	B. Wilson	0:32
17.	"'Til I Die" (a Cappella)	B. Wilson	B. Wilson, C. Wilson	2:36
18.	"Surf's Up" (a Cappella)	B. Wilson, Parks	C. Wilson, B. Wilson	4:04

Bonus tracks
No.	Title	Writer(s)	Producer(s)	Length
19.	"I Just Got My Pay" (2019 mix)	B. Wilson, Jardine	B. Wilson	2:43
20.	"Walkin'" (2019 mix)	B. Wilson, Jardine	B. Wilson	2:44
21.	"When Girls Get Together" (2019 mix)	B. Wilson, Love	B. Wilson	3:45
22.	"Baby Baby"	D. Wilson, Daryl Dragon	D. Wilson	3:13
23.	"Awake"	Floyd Tucker	B. Wilson	3:44
24.	"It's a New Day"	D. Wilson, Dragon, Shapiro	D. Wilson	2:20

==== Disc five ====
Bonus tracks
No.	Title	Writer(s)	Producer(s)	Length
1.	"This Whole World" (alternate ending)	B. Wilson	C. Wilson, B. Wilson	1:41
2.	"Add Some Music To Your Day" (alternate version)	B. Wilson, Knott, Love	B. Wilson	3:27
3.	"Don't Go Near The Water" (alternate version)	Love, Jardine	Jardine, C. Wilson	2:42
4.	"Surf's Up, Pt. 1" (1971 remake track with 1966 Brian vocal)	B. Wilson, Parks	B. Wilson, C. Wilson	1:41
5.	"Soulful Old Man Sunshine" (2019 mix)	B. Wilson, Rick Henn, Don Ralke	Henn, B. Wilson	3:14
6.	"I'm Goin' Your Way" (alternate mix)	D. Wilson	D. Wilson	2:24
7.	"Where Is She?" (2019 mix)	B. Wilson	B. Wilson	2:22
8.	"Carnival (Over the Waves)/Sobra las Olas)" (2019 mix)	Juventino Rosas	B. Wilson	1:34
9.	"It's Natural"	David Sandler	B. Wilson, Sandler	2:35
10.	"Medley: All Of My Love/Ecology"	D. Wilson, Dragon	D. Wilson	5:05
11.	"Before"	D. Wilson, Dragon	D. Wilson	2:25
12.	"Behold the Night"	D. Wilson, Dragon	D. Wilson	2:26
13.	"Old Movie (Cuddle Up)"	D. Wilson, Dragon	D. Wilson	3:37
14.	"Hawaiian Dream"	D. Wilson, Dragon	D. Wilson	4:33
15.	"Settle Down/Sound of Free" (basic session outtake)	D. Wilson, Love	D. Wilson	2:17
16.	"I've Got a Friend"	D. Wilson	D. Wilson	2:26
17.	"'Til I Die" (piano demo)	B. Wilson	B. Wilson, C. Wilson	1:55
18.	"Back Home" (demo)	B. Wilson, Norberg, Jardine	Jardine, B. Wilson	2:20
19.	"Back Home" (alternate version)	B. Wilson, Norberg, Jardine	Jardine	2:34
20.	"Won't You Tell Me" (demo)	M. Wilson, B. Wilson	B. Wilson	2:01
21.	"Won't You Tell Me" (2019 mix)	M. Wilson, B. Wilson	M. Wilson, Henn	2:54
22.	"Barbara" (2020 mix)	D. Wilson, Dragon	D. Wilson	2:59
23.	"Slip On Through" (early version track)	D. Wilson, Jakobson	D. Wilson	2:48
24.	"Susie Cincinnati" (basic session highlights)	Jardine	Jardine, B. Wilson	3:05
25.	"My Solution" (track and backing vocals)	B. Wilson	B. Wilson	3:04
26.	"You Never Give Me Your Money"	John Lennon, Paul McCartney	The Beach Boys	0:40
27.	"Medley: Happy Birthday, Brian/God Only Knows"	B. Wilson, Tony Asher	The Beach Boys	2:47
28.	"You Need a Mess of Help to Stand Alone" (track and backing vocals)	B. Wilson, Rieley	C. Wilson	3:32
29.	"Marcella" (a Cappella)	B. Wilson, Rieley, Tandyn Almer	The Beach Boys	3:27

=== 2-CD edition ===
==== Disc one ====
Sunflower 2019 remaster – as above

Sunflower bonus tracks
No.	Title	Length
13.	"Loop De Loop" (1969 mix)	2:58
14.	"San Miguel" (2020 mix)	2:19
15.	"Susie Cincinnati" (2019 mix)	3:01
16.	"Good Time" (2019 mix)	2:55
17.	"I Just Got My Pay" (2019 mix)	2:43
18.	"Two Can Play" (2019 mix)	2:06
19.	"I'm Goin' Your Way" (Alternate mix)	2:10
20.	"Where Is She" (2019 mix)	2:21
21.	"Break Away (Tag)" (Backing vocals excerpt)	0:17
22.	"Our Sweet Love" (String section)	1:00
23.	"This Whole World" (Alternate ending)	1:41
24.	"Soulful Old Man Sunshine" (2019 mix)	3:00
25.	"All I Wanna Do" (a Capella)	2:41
26.	"Back Home" (Alternate version)	2:34
27.	"When Girls Get Together" (2019 mix)	3:45
28.	"Cotton Fields (The Cotton Song)" (2021 stereo mix)	3:21
29.	"This Whole World" (Live 1988)	2:01
30.	"Sunflower Promo 1" (previously unreleased)	0:59

==== Disc two ====
Surf's Up 2019 remaster – as above

Surf's Up Bonus Tracks
No.	Title	Length
11.	"It's a New Day"	2:20
12.	"Big Sur" (1970 version)	2:35
13.	"(Wouldn't It Be Nice to) Live Again" (Extended 2019)	4:36
14.	"4th of July" (2019 mix)	3:09
15.	"Lady (Fallin' in Love)" (1970 stereo mix)	2:21
16.	"Behold the Night"	2:23
17.	"Medley: All of My Love / Ecology"	4:16
18.	"Sweet and Bitter"	2:20
19.	"My Solution"	3:43
20.	"Awake"	3:17
21.	"Disney Girls" (Live 1982)	4:19
22.	"Surf's Up" (Live 1973)	4:55
23.	"You Need a Mess of Help to Stand Alone" (Track & backing vocals)	3:15
24.	"Feel Flows" (Backing vocals excerpt)	0:32
25.	"Disney Girls" (Backing vocals excerpt)	0:19

=== Double LP edition ===
Side one – Sunflower 2019 remaster and bonus tracks
No.	Title	Length
1.	"Slip On Through"	2:19
2.	"This Whole World"	1:58
3.	"Add Some Music to Your Day"	3:36
4.	"Got to Know the Woman"	2:43
5.	"Deirdre"	3:30
6.	"It's About Time"	2:57
7.	"Cotton Fields" (2020 stereo mix, previously unreleased)	3:16
8.	"San Miguel" (Backing vocals excerpt, previously unreleased)	0:35
9.	"It's About Time" (Backing vocals excerpt, previously unreleased)	0:50

Side two – Sunflower 2019 remaster and bonus tracks
No.	Title	Length
1.	"Tears in the Morning"	4:07
2.	"All I Wanna Do"	2:36
3.	"Forever"	2:42
4.	"Our Sweet Love"	2:41
5.	"At My Window"	2:32
6.	"Cool, Cool Water"	5:03
7.	"This Whole World" (Live 1988, previously unreleased)	2:01

Side three – Surf's Up 2019 remaster and bonus tracks
No.	Title	Length
1.	"Don't Go Near the Water"	2:41
2.	"Long Promised Road"	3:32
3.	"Take a Load Off Your Feet"	2:32
4.	"Disney Girls (1957)"	4:08
5.	"Student Demonstration Time"	3:59
6.	"Disney Girls" (Live 1982)	4:19
7.	"Feel Flows" (Backing vocals excerpt)	0:33

Side four – Surf's Up 2019 remaster and bonus tracks
No.	Title	Length
1.	"Feel Flows"	4:44
2.	"Lookin' at Tomorrow (A Welfare Song)"	1:57
3.	"A Day in the Life of a Tree"	3:09
4.	"'Til I Die"	2:32
5.	"Surf's Up"	4:14
6.	"A Day in the Life of a Tree" (Track & backing vocals)	2:54
7.	"'Til I Die" (a Capella)	2:11

=== Quadruple LP edition ===
First LP, sides one and two – Sunflower 2019 remaster and bonus tracks – same running order as 1st LP of double LP edition

Second LP, side one – Sunflower bonus tracks
No.	Title	Length
1.	"Loop de Loop" (Original 1969 mix)	2:59
2.	"San Miguel" (2020 mix)	2:20
3.	"Susie Cincinnati" (2020 mix)	3:02
4.	"Good Time" (2019 mix)	2:56
5.	"I Just Got My Pay" (2019 mix)	2:43
6.	"Two Can Play" (2019 mix)	2:06
7.	"I'm Goin' Your Way" (Alternate mix)	2:10
8.	"Where Is She" (2019 mix)	2:22
9.	"Break Away (Tag)" (Backing vocals excerpt)	0:18
10.	"Our Sweet Love" (String section)	1:00

Second LP, side two – Sunflower bonus tracks
No.	Title	Length
1.	"This Whole World" (Alternate ending)	1:41
2.	"Add Some Music to Your Day" (Alternate version)	3:27
3.	"Soulful Old Man Sunshine" (2019 mix)	3:00
4.	"All I Wanna Do" (a Capella)	2:41
5.	"Back Home" (Alternate version)	2:34
6.	"When Girls Get Together" (2019 mix)	3:45
7.	"It's About Time" (Live 1971)	3:55
8.	"This Whole World" (Backing vocals section)	0:34

Third LP, sides one and two – Surf's Up 2019 remaster and bonus tracks – same running order as 2nd LP of double LP edition

Fourth LP, side one – Surf's Up bonus tracks
No.	Title	Length
1.	"It's a New Day"	2:20
2.	"Big Sur" (1970 version)	2:35
3.	"(Wouldn't It Be Nice to) Live Again" (2019 mix)	4:35
4.	"H.E.L.P. is On the Way" (2019 mix)	2:31
5.	"4th of July" (2019 mix)	3:09
6.	"Lady (Fallin' in Love)" (1970 stereo mix)	2:21
7.	"Behold the Night"	2:24
8.	"'Til I Die" (Piano demo)	1:55

Fourth LP, side two – Surf's Up bonus tracks
No.	Title	Length
1.	"Medley: All of My Love / Ecology"	4:15
2.	"Sweet and Bitter"	2:21
3.	"My Solution"	3:43
4.	"Awake"	3:17
5.	"Take a Load Off Your Feet" (Live 1993)	2:26
6.	"Surf's Up" (Live 1973)	4:56
7.	"A Day in the Life of a Tree" (Backing vocals excerpt)	0:32
8.	"Disney Girls" (Backing vocals excerpt)	0:20

== Charts ==
Chart performance for Feel Flows
Chart (2021)	Peak position
Austrian Albums (Ö3 Austria)	38
Belgian Albums (Ultratop Flanders)	87
Belgian Albums (Ultratop Wallonia)	122
Dutch Albums (Album Top 100)	13
German Albums (Offizielle Top 100)	19
Irish Albums (IRMA)	93
Scottish Albums (Official Charts)	4
Spanish Albums (Promusicae)	77
Swiss Albums (Schweizer Hitparade)	21
UK Albums (Official Charts)	19
US Billboard 200	83

== See also ==
- The Beach Boys bootleg recordings
- List of unreleased songs recorded by the Beach Boys
