= Forever (The Beach Boys song) =

Single by the Beach Boys

from the album Sunflower
- A-side: "Cool, Cool Water"
- Released: March 1971
- Recorded: March 12–17, 1969
- Studio: Gold Star and Beach Boys, Los Angeles
- Length: 2:40
- Label: Brother/Reprise
- Songwriters: Dennis Wilson, Gregg Jakobson
- Producer: The Beach Boys

The Beach Boys singles chronology
"Tears in the Morning" (1970)	"Forever" (1971)	"Wouldn't It Be Nice (live)" (1971)

"Forever" is a song by the American rock band the Beach Boys from their 1970 album Sunflower. It was written by Dennis Wilson and Gregg Jakobson. Dennis sang lead vocal. His brother Brian assisted with the arrangement.

== Reception ==
Brian Wilson declared of the song, "'Forever' has to be the most harmonically beautiful thing I've ever heard. It's a rock and roll prayer." AllMusic reviewer Matthew Greenwalk wrote,

Easily one of the standouts on the Sunflower album, "Forever" is sort of a capper on Dennis Wilson's unexpected burst of creativity during the 1968-1969 period. A lovely, effervescent melody frames his soulful vocal and lyrics, which are as an accurate description on everlasting love and faithfulness as one could ever want to hear. There is a timeless quality to the whole piece, which is not unlike some of the more refined Elton John/Bernie Taupin ballads that would dominate the pop charts later in the 1970s. The unfortunate timing of the Charles Manson murders during this period sadly took some air out of Dennis' creative drive, yet this is still one of the greatest examples of his artistry.

== Other releases ==
- In 1972, American Spring, a duo consisting of Brian Wilson's then-wife Marilyn and her sister Diane Rovell included it on their sole album, produced by Wilson.
- In 2003, an a cappella version was included on the Beach Boys' compilation Hawthorne, CA.
- In 2021, session highlights, instrumental, and a cappella versions were included on the band's box set Feel Flows.

== John Stamos version ==
A newly recorded version featuring lead vocals from actor and Beach Boys sideman John Stamos, appeared on the band's 1992 album Summer in Paradise. Stamos performed the song on at least three episodes of his sitcom Full House (one of them during his character's 1991 wedding). On the first episode of Fuller House in 2016, "Forever" was once again performed by Jesse and the Rippers with other characters from the show singing as well.

=== Charts ===
Chart performance for "Forever" by the Beach Boys and John Stamos
Chart (1993)	Peak position
Australia (ARIA)	100

== Personnel ==
Sourced from Craig Slowinski.

The Beach Boys

- Bruce Johnston – piano
- Mike Love – harmony and backing vocals
- Brian Wilson – harmony and backing vocals
- Carl Wilson – harmony and backing vocals, acoustic guitar, Rocksichord
- Dennis Wilson – lead vocals, harmony and backing vocals, piano, tambourine, production

Additional musicians

- Mike Anthony – electric guitar
- Jimmy Bond – arco double bass
- Lyle Ritz – bass
- Daryl Dragon – vibraphone
- Gene Estes – drums
- Frank Capp – tympani
- Orville “Red” Rhodes – pedal steel guitar
- Paul Beaver – Moog synthesizer
- Spiro Stamos, Roy Tanabe, Shari Zippert, Jay Rosen – violins

Additional production staff

- Stephen Desper – engineer
- Doc Siegel – additional engineer
