= It's About Time (The Beach Boys song) =

Single by the Beach Boys

from the album Sunflower
- A-side: "Tears in the Morning"
- Released: October 12, 1970
- Recorded: July 1970
- Studio: Beach Boys Studio, Los Angeles
- Genre: Rock; psychedelic pop
- Length: 2:55
- Label: Brother/Reprise
- Songwriters: Dennis Wilson, Bob Burchman, Al Jardine, Carl Wilson
- Producer: The Beach Boys

The Beach Boys singles chronology
"Slip On Through" (1970)	"It's About Time" (1970)	"Cool, Cool Water" (1971)

"It's About Time" is a song by American rock band the Beach Boys from their 1970 album Sunflower. Written by Dennis Wilson, Al Jardine, Bob Burchman and Carl Wilson, it was issued as the B-side of the "Tears in the Morning" single. Jardine said, "'It's About Time' was Carl, Dennis and I. That's a good one. I like that production. That was mostly Dennis, and I just helped with the lyrics. Dennis and Carl did the track."

== Reception ==
Biographer Timothy White wrote:

The Santana-like Latin pivot of its percussion gave the song a nice tension, and the personal renewal described by the song’s central character triggers a driving guitar break that makes his second chance seem both plausible and thrilling. And undidactic commentary on rock indulgence and self-redemption, it was also a wishful scenario regarding both Brian and Dennis Wilson’s sporadic personal troubles.

Reviewing the song for AllMusic, Matthew Greenwald wrote:

Perhaps the Beach Boys' most contemporary piece of music recorded in 1969, "It's About Time" is a total group effort, between the writing, singing, and performing. A solid, almost dark R&B/rock feel guides the melody with a sense of precision. Interestingly, one of the most unusual features of the song is the Latin-based, in-studio jam that closes the song with great power. An autobiographical song about the pitfalls of stardom and being an artist, this song hit close to home, especially considering the band's fluctuating fortunes and popularity of the period.

== Personnel ==
Sourced from Craig Slowinski.

The Beach Boys

- Al Jardine – backing vocals, rhythm guitar
- Bruce Johnston – backing vocals
- Mike Love – lead vocals (bridge), backing vocals
- Brian Wilson- backing vocals
- Carl Wilson – lead and backing vocals, lead guitars, production
- Dennis Wilson – backing vocals, production

Additional musicians and production staff

- Daryl Dragon – tack piano; organ (uncertain)
- Jimmy Bond – double bass, electric bass
- Earl Palmer – drums
- Dennis Dragon – congas, cowbells, timbales
- Stephen Desper – engineer
