= This Whole World =

Single by the Beach Boys

from the album Sunflower
- A-side: "Slip On Through"
- Released: June 29, 1970
- Recorded: November 13, 1969
- Studio: Beach Boys Studio, Los Angeles
- Genre: Pop; doo-wop
- Length: 2:00
- Label: Brother/Reprise
- Songwriter: Brian Wilson
- Producer: The Beach Boys

The Beach Boys singles chronology
"Cotton Fields" (1970)	"This Whole World" (1970)	"Tears in the Morning" (1970)

Licensed audio
- "This Whole World" on YouTube

Audio sample
- file; help

"This Whole World" is a song by American rock band the Beach Boys from their 1970 album Sunflower. Written by Brian Wilson, the song features his brother Carl on lead vocals and is credited as a Beach Boys production. Earlier in the year, it had been included on the Warner Brothers promotional sampler album The Big Ball, and as a single, fronted with "Slip On Through", but did not make the U.S. or UK pop charts.

== Background ==
Brian recalled writing "This Whole World" during one night at his Beverly Hills mansion when he was "stoned and confused". He stated that the song was written in approximately 90 minutes at around 2:00 a.m. "I got up and went to my white Baldwin organ and I was playing around and thinking about the love of this whole world and that’s what inspired me to write the song."

He also said of the song: "A very special vocal by Carl, and the lyrics are very spiritual. The melody and chord pattern rambles but it comes back to where it started." Regarding the lyrics, he said, "It’s about love in general. ... That song came from deep down in me, from the feeling I had that the whole world should be about love. When I wrote that song I wanted to capture that idea.'"

== Composition ==
Biographer Mark Dillon characterized "This Whole World" as an "old-fashioned" rock song with "doo-wop trimmings" that contains an unorthodox structure and numerous key modulations. Musician Scott McCaughey said that the structure followed an A/B/C/A/B/C pattern, however, "it seems to never repeat itself once. Every section has something new and different going on." Musicologist Philip Lambert offered a summary of the song's exceptional "tonal transience":

First, a C-major phrase ends on IV, which becomes ♭VI in A, and then an A-major phrase ends on iii, which becomes a new i in C♯. This new phrase then moves through a diatonic bass descent from 1̂ to 5̂, eventually arriving at the key of B♭ using the same pivot relationship heard earlier between C and A (IV = ♭VI). Finally, the phrase in B♭ concludes on V, which is reinterpreted as IV to return to C major ...

In 1978, Beach Boys supporting keyboardist Daryl Dragon commented on the song's various key changes: "From a harmony standpoint, I've never heard a song like that since I've been in pop music. I've never heard a song go through that many changes and come back."

== Recording ==
The track was recorded in one session on November 13, 1969, at Beach Boys Studio. According to Brian: "I produced that record. I taught Carl the lead and the other guys the background vocal, especially the meditation part at the end: 'Om dot dit it.'" The track originally ran "far longer" but was trimmed down. Brian later commented, "I remember 'This Whole World' took a couple of days to record. It took a lot of hard work to get that one but I’m real happy with it." Another version with an alternate ending was created for an Eastern Airlines commercial that the group briefly appeared in.

== Critical reception ==
AllMusic wrote: "Brian reestablished his reputation as one of the most brilliant melody writers and arrangers. With a buoyant melody and an effervescent, classy vocal arrangement, Brian wipes away three years of artistic cobwebs."

== Cover versions ==
- Brian produced a version of the song (which also incorporates "Star Light, Star Bright" in the bridge) for then-wife Marilyn's pop duo American Spring on their 1972 album Spring.
- Brian re-recorded the song for his 1995 soundtrack album I Just Wasn't Made for These Times.
- Dolour covered the song for the 2002 Brian tribute album Making God Smile: An Artists' Tribute to the Songs of Beach Boy Brian Wilson.
- The Lemon Twigs have covered the song live on numerous occasions.

== Personnel ==
Sourced from Craig Slowinski.

The Beach Boys

- Brian Wilson – intro lead vocals, backing vocals, piano, production
- Bruce Johnston – backing vocals
- Mike Love – intro lead vocals, backing vocals
- Al Jardine – backing vocals
- Carl Wilson – lead vocals, acoustic guitar, production
- Dennis Wilson – backing vocals

Additional musicians and production staff

- Jerry Cole – rhythm/lead guitar
- David Cohen – lead guitar
- Jack Conrad – bass
- Ray Pohlman – six-string bass
- Daryl Dragon – electric harpsichord, chimes, tubular bells
- Dennis Dragon – drums
- Gene Estes – chimes, glockenspiel
- Stephen Desper – engineer
