= All I Wanna Do (The Beach Boys song) =

Song by the Beach Boys

from the album Sunflower
- Released: August 31, 1970
- Recorded: March 19, 1969
- Studio: Gold Star and Beach Boys, Los Angeles
- Genre: Dream pop; chillwave; proto-shoegaze
- Length: 2:34
- Label: Brother/Reprise
- Songwriters: Brian Wilson; Mike Love
- Producer: The Beach Boys

Licensed audio
- "All I Wanna Do" on YouTube

Audio sample
- file; help

"All I Wanna Do" is a song by the American rock band the Beach Boys from their 1970 album Sunflower. Written by Brian Wilson and Mike Love, its production involved extensive overdubbing, reverb and delay effects. It was influential to the development of lo-fi music and pioneered sounds that became associated with the shoegaze, dream pop, and chillwave music genres.

Initially recorded for the albums Friends (1968) and 20/20 (1969), Carl Wilson produced the final Sunflower version, likely with assistance from Brian. The arrangement features multiple vocal parts sung in counterpoint, 12-string guitar, Rocksichord, electric sitar, and a Moog synthesizer played by band engineer Stephen Desper. Love's lead vocal is accompanied by harmonies sung by all members of the band.

Brian later said that he felt the final recording was "a boring song" that diverged from his intended vision, although he subsequently called it “a real nice one”. The band never performed it in concert, although Love's touring edition of the group did, in 2015. In 2018, an earlier version of the track was released on the compilation I Can Hear Music: The 20/20 Sessions. In 2021, isolated vocals and backing track versions were released on Feel Flows.

== Composition ==
"All I Wanna Do" was written by the band's Brian Wilson and Mike Love. The instrumentation consists of 12-string guitar, Rocksichord, electric sitar, drums, double bass, electric bass, piano, shaker, and Moog synthesizer. According to academic Philip Lambert,

In "All I Wanna Do" the lush backing chorus grows in intensity along with the love expressed in the lyric. By the time the chorus arrives, the depth and complexity of the singer's feelings are captured by an intricate layering of a main tune repeating the song title, a midrange non-texted countermelody in response, a "doot-doot-doot" line reaffirming the mellow beat, and a foundational bass line. It's the next step beyond the elegantly transparent layered endings of "Fun, Fun, Fun" and "God Only Knows" and so many others.

Talking about the song in 1995, Brian expressed: "That was one of those songs that had a nice chord pattern, but I think it was a boring song, and I thought it wasn't done right. I thought it should have been softer, with boxed guitars." In 2000, he called the song "a real nice one". In 2015, Love commented that "All I Wanna Do" was "totally poetic and quite heartfelt".

== Recording ==
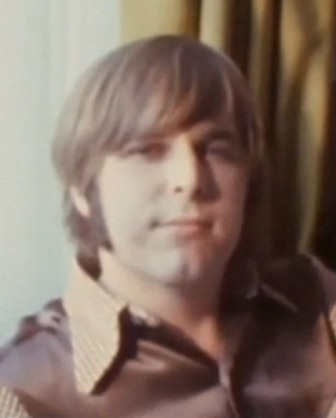
Carl Wilson (pictured 1969) produced the song's recording sessions, sang backing vocals, and played the lead guitar line

"All I Wanna Do" was produced by Carl Wilson, likely with assistance from Brian, at various professional studios, including the band's own private studio. On February 24, 1968, an early version of the song was recorded during the Friends sessions. Another version was recorded on May 24 and June 8. One of these versions, which makes use of a sitar-like instrument, appears on the 2018 compilation: I Can Hear Music: The 20/20 Sessions.

Another session for the song took place on March 19, 1969, at Gold Star Studios. The final arrangement opted for a guitar line which Mathew Greenwald of AllMusic describes as "Byrds-like". Heavy reverb was applied to the mix. Carl played 12-string guitar, Rocksichord, and electric sitar, while engineer Stephen Desper played Moog synthesizer. The remaining instrumentalist roles were filled in by various session musicians. The vocals were recorded at the band's studio, as overdubs onto the Gold Star track, and feature all six members, with Love handling the lead.

== Critical reception ==
In 1970, Jim Miller of Rolling Stone noted production elements made the listening experience "mind-wrenching". Greenwald called the song a lost classic, writing: "Possibly one of the most beautiful and unusual songs and recordings on the Sunflower album... Mike Love deserves high marks for his vocal and lyric contributions, which may be his most tasteful in the scope of the entire Beach Boys canon. Brian Wilson's haunting, minor-key melody and ghostly arrangement is truly bittersweet evidence that he had certainly not lost his artistic grasp." Greenwald afforded accolades to the song's arrangement, citing the effectiveness of the piccolo snare drum and the well-executed harmonies.

A 2016 reader's poll conducted by Rolling Stone ranked it the fourth-best Beach Boys song that was not a hit record. In 2021, the song was ranked number eight on Ultimate Classic Rock's listicle of the finest "post-Pet Sounds Beach Boys songs". Contributor Nick Deriso noted that the song resembled "a prehistoric dream-pop song" and had been admired by many "bedroom-recording chillwave kids". In 2022, The Guardian's Alexis Petridis ranked it number 17 on a list of the greatest Beach Boys songs.

== Influence ==
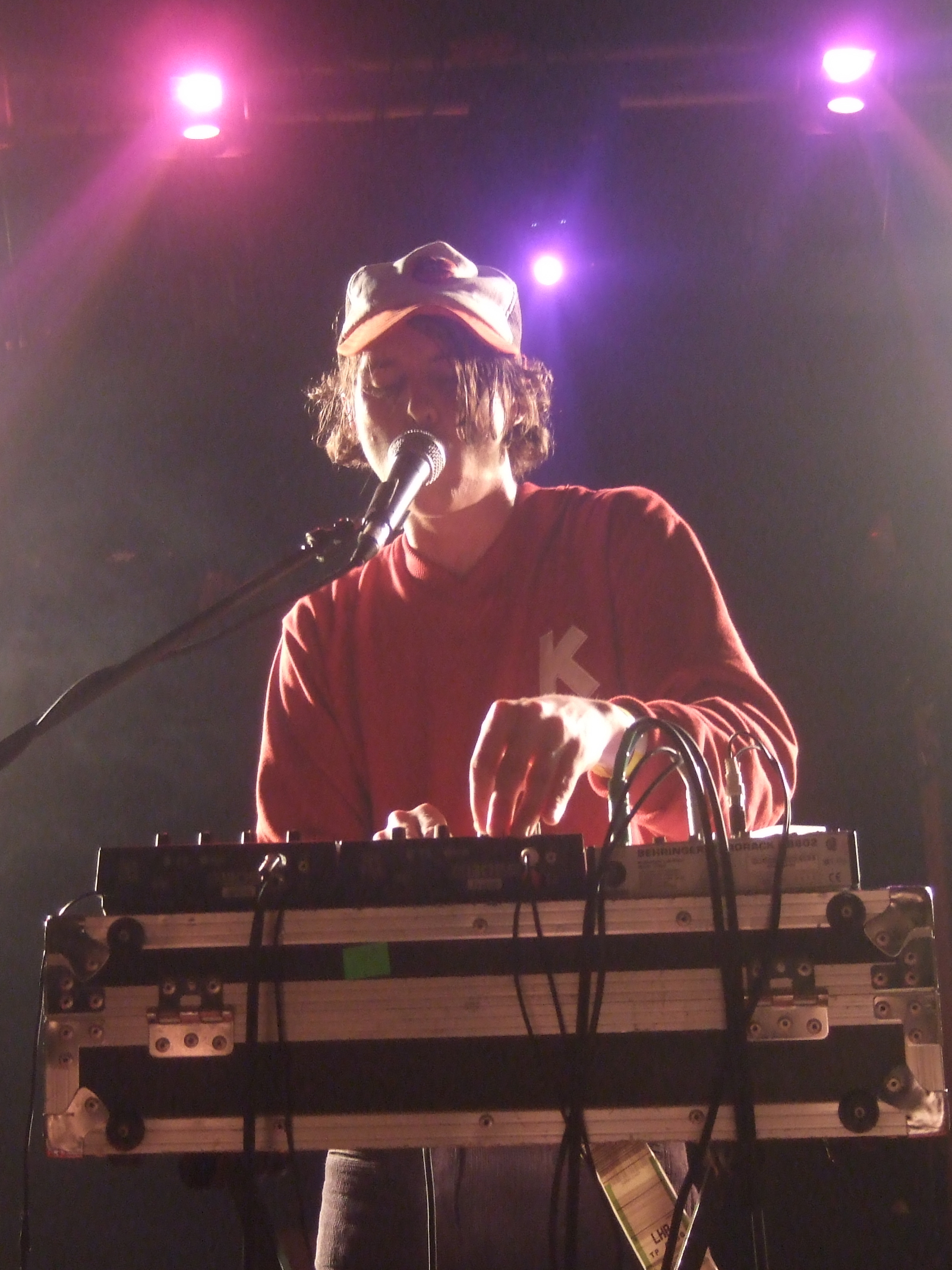
"All I Wanna Do" anticipated the reverb-saturated production styles of acts such as Panda Bear, whose 2007 album Person Pitch led critics to rediscover the song in light of the Beach Boys' continued influence on contemporary indie music.

"All I Wanna Do" has been cited as a point of origin of the dream pop, shoegaze, and chillwave genres. It is further regarded as "the first chillwave song". American Songwriter's Catherine Wathall supported that the song contained a "chillwave essence", while the publication Future Music listed the song as part of a "beginner's guide" to chillwave.

Critic Jim Allen, who cites the Beach Boys as the "godfathers" of dream pop, says that the song's unprecedented "cinematic dream sequence" production style marks the point "where the dream pop family tree starts to come into focus." However, because the group were predominantly known for hit singles such as "Kokomo" during the 1980s, critics had largely disregarded the band's 1970s recording output, and the Beach Boys' impact on the genre was not widely acknowledged until after the 2000s. Allen goes on to draw connections between the sound of "All I Wanna Do" and acts such as the Radio Dept., M83, Panda Bear, Beach House, A Sunny Day in Glasgow, and Au Revoir Simone.

Writing in Record Collector, Jamie Atkins said that the song ranks among the Beach Boys' "most subtly influential – makers of ambrosial lo-fi, from Galaxie 500 to Ariel Pink to Panda Bear, owe plenty to its reverb-heavy sound." In his retrospective review of Sunflower, Pitchfork's Hefner Macauley acknowledged the song as a work of "proto-shoegaze". Katie Cameron of Paste concurred that the song was an "undeniably cool shoegazing precursor", while The Guardian's Dave Simpson argued that it effectively invented the shoegaze genre, "20 years before its time."

== Live performances ==
In 2015, the Beach Boys briefly began playing the song live for the first time.

== Cover versions ==
- 2000 – June & the Exit Wounds, Caroline Now!
- 2016 – The Bright Light Social Hour, All Along the Moontower: Austin Gets Psychedelic
- 2023 – Healing Potpourri, Lagniappe Sessions
- 2023 - Los Angeles shoegaze band Modern Time Machines released a cover version of "All I Wanna Do" on their "Beachtime" EP.
- 2024 - Young Hunting and Tomemitsu "All I Wanna Do" Valentine's Day single

== Personnel ==
Credits sourced from Beach Boys archivist Craig Slowinski.

The Beach Boys

- Al Jardine – harmony and backing vocals
- Bruce Johnston – harmony and backing vocals
- Mike Love – lead vocals, harmony and backing vocals
- Brian Wilson – harmony and backing vocals
- Carl Wilson – harmony and backing vocals, 12-string lead guitar, Rocksichord, electric sitar, production
- Dennis Wilson – harmony and backing vocals

Additional musicians and production staff

- Hal Blaine – drums
- Jimmy Bond – double bass, electric bass
- Al Casey – rhythm guitar
- Gene Estes – shaker
- Mike Melvoin – piano
- Stephen Desper – engineer, Moog synthesizer
- Doc Siegel – engineer
