= Our Sweet Love =

Song by the Beach Boys

from the album Sunflower
- Released: August 31, 1970
- Recorded: November 6, 1969 – January 26, 1970
- Studio: Gold Star and Beach Boys Studio, Los Angeles
- Length: 2:38
- Label: Brother/Reprise
- Songwriter(s): Brian Wilson; Carl Wilson; Al Jardine
- Producer(s): The Beach Boys

Licensed audio
- "Our Sweet Love" on YouTube

"Our Sweet Love" is a song by the American rock band the Beach Boys from their 1970 album Sunflower. Written by Brian Wilson, Carl Wilson, and Al Jardine, "Our Sweet Love" features a lush sound that has been compared to the band's work on Pet Sounds. Brian Wilson originally left the song unfinished, resulting in the band completing it for Sunflower. Carl Wilson sings the song's lead vocal.

== Background ==
"Our Sweet Love" is a reworking of a Friends outtake, "Our New Home". The nucleus of the song was largely composed by Brian Wilson, who commented: "I wrote that for Carl. After I wrote it I said, 'Hey, he could sing this good' so I gave it to Carl." However, in another interview, Brian characterized the song as a collaboration with Carl, stating, "We tried [writing together] one time and wrote 'Good Timin″ and 'Our Sweet Love.' Carl was a very very sensitive writer, he was a sensitive person, he was a very good artist." (Note: Contrary to Brian's claim, biographer Peter Ames Carlin writes that "Good Timin'" was first written in 1974.) According to Al Jardine, Brian refused to complete the song and the rest of the band worked to finish it: "'Our Sweet Love' was one we finished with Brian. He just didn't want to finish it. So we kind of helped. We became completers of ideas."

The song features a string arrangement provided by French composer Michel Colombier, overdubbed on January 26, 1970. Colombier also arranged two other tracks on Sunflower, both largely composed by Bruce Johnston: "Deirdre" and "Tears in the Morning".

== Release ==
"Our Sweet Love" was included on early versions of the Sunflower album (versions with the provisional titles Sun Flower and Add Some Music) that were rejected by Reprise Records. The song remained on the final released Sunflower track listing when it was released in 1970.

In addition to a remastering of the original recording, two alternate tracks of "Our Sweet Love" were included on the 2021 Feel Flows boxset. One features only track and backing vocals, while another features the song's isolated string part.

== Critical reception ==
In a 1970 review of Sunflower, Rolling Stone wrote that the song "is most reminiscent of the mood of Pet Sounds."

Critical appraisal of the song remains high in retrospective writings. The Quietus praised the song as "a straightforward but strong ballad led by the angelic tones of little brother Carl." Glide Magazine lauded the song's "mature expressions of emotion". Matthew Greenwald of AllMusic said, "'Our Sweet Love' could have easily fit on [Pet Sounds] in terms of feel and lyric message. Celebrating the simple pleasures of pure love and tranquility, it may be one of the best Beach Boys love ballads."

== Personnel ==
Sourced from Craig Slowinski. The bassist could not be identified.

The Beach Boys

- Brian Wilson - backing vocals, piano
- Carl Wilson - lead and backing vocals, electric guitar, clavinet, sleigh bells

Additional musicians

- Hal Blaine - drums, castanet
- Michel Colombier - string arrangement
- Alvin Dinkin - viola
- Sam Freed - violin
- David Frisina - violin
- Allan Harstian - viola
- Igor Horoshevsky - cello
- Anatol Kaminsky - violin
- Nathan Kaproff - violin
- George Kast - violin
- Marvin Limonick - violin
- Abe Luboff - arco double bass
- Edgar Lustgarten - cello
- Virginia Majewski - viola
- Alexander Murray - violin
- Robert Ostrowsky - viola
- Dorothy Wade - violin

== Bibliography ==
- Badman, Keith (2004). The Beach Boys: The Definitive Diary of America's Greatest Band, on Stage and in the Studio. Backbeat Books. ISBN 978-0-87930-818-6.
- Carlin, Peter Ames (2006). Catch a Wave: The Rise, Fall, and Redemption of the Beach Boys' Brian Wilson. Rodale. ISBN 978-1-59486-320-2.
