= Slip On Through =

Single by the Beach Boys

from the album Sunflower
- B-side: "This Whole World"
- Released: June 29, 1970
- Recorded: c. October 1–13, 1969
- Studio: Beach Boys Studio, Los Angeles
- Genre: Rock
- Length: 2:17
- Label: Brother/Reprise
- Songwriters: Dennis Wilson, Gregg Jakobson
- Producer: The Beach Boys

The Beach Boys singles chronology
"Cotton Fields" (1970)	"Slip On Through" (1970)	"Tears in the Morning" (1970)

Music video
- "Slip On Through" on YouTube

Audio sample
- file; help

"Slip On Through" is a song by the American rock band the Beach Boys from their 1970 album Sunflower. Written by Dennis Wilson and Gregg Jakobson, it was issued as a single with the B-side "This Whole World". It did not chart.

== Authorship ==
"Slip On Through" was originally credited to Dennis Wilson alone. After Brother Records archive manager Alan Boyd consulted with Wilson's publishing and estate, a credit for Gregg Jakobson was added to the song on the 2021 compilation Feel Flows.

== Recording ==
An early version of the song was recorded at Gold Star Studios in Hollywood. The final version was recorded at the Beach Boys' studio on October 6, 1969.

== Reception ==
Brian Wilson said, "It was a really dynamic song. Dennis, I was very proud of, because he really rocked and rolled on that one. Dennis did really interesting energetic things on that."

Record World said that "a combination of the old and new Beach Boy sound is fantastic."

== Personnel ==
Sourced from Craig Slowinski.

The Beach Boys

- Al Jardine – backing vocals
- Bruce Johnston – backing vocals
- Mike Love – backing vocals
- Brian Wilson – backing vocals
- Carl Wilson – backing vocals, rhythm guitar
- Dennis Wilson – lead and backing vocals, piano, additional guitar through Leslie speaker, production; cowbell (uncertain)

Additional musicians and production staff

- Jack Conrad – lead guitar
- Daryl Dragon – bass
- Dennis Dragon – drums, congas
- John Audino – trumpet
- Tony Terran – trumpet
- Stephen Desper – engineer
