= My Solution =

Song by the Beach Boys

from the album Feel Flows
- Released: August 27, 2021
- Recorded: October 31, 1970
- Studio: Beach Boys Studio, Los Angeles
- Genre: Novelty; Halloween
- Length: 3:44
- Label: Capitol/UMG
- Songwriter: Brian Wilson
- Producer: Brian Wilson

Licensed audio
- "My Solution" on YouTube

"My Solution" is a song by the American rock band The Beach Boys that was recorded during the early sessions for their 1971 album Surf's Up. The track is a novelty Halloween song that features Brian Wilson doing an impression of Boris Karloff over a descending chord progression and test-tube sound effects. The song was officially released as part of the 2021 compilation Feel Flows.

== Background ==
"My Solution" was written by Brian Wilson and recorded on October 31, 1970, shortly before the sessions for the group's album Surf's Up. Photographs of the session show the band dressed in Halloween costumes, including Wilson, whose face was painted green like Frankenstein. Band archivist Alan Boyd said: "It’s kind of jokey track, Brian is playing a mad scientist and talking like Boris Karloff while the Beach Boys are singing (recites lyrics) 'What I have done with my solution, my instant aim to evolution.'" His colleague Mark Linett surmised, "It's just having the studio in the house, and deciding, 'Let’s do a Halloween-inspired, clubhouse kind of event.' I don’t know that it was ever intended to be released."

In a 1976 interview, Brian said: "We have a song called 'My Solution' which is a very odd song that has chromatic—strange chords, not regular triad chords. The notes are bunched up. It tells the story about how a guy found an old damsel outside his castle and decided to make her part of an experiment. ... It's about a guy who found his solution. It's a very odd, Boris Karloff-eerie type of thing, so it's one of our more far-out, left-field things that we've done."

Biographer David Leaf mentions "My Solution" in the 1985 edition of his 1978 biography The Beach Boys and the California Myth:

One of the most unusual visits [since I had published my book] was when Brian came to my home to borrow a tape of one of his unreleased songs. He wanted to work on a new arrangement of the still-unreleased 'My Solution' and needed to hear how the old version went. I'd never told Brian about my tape collection. He just knew that I had it. Brian's behavior consistently demonstrated an uncanny omniscience which extended far beyond his musical gift and was most surprising, given his public playing of possum.

Another attempt at "My Solution" was recorded during the summer of 1980, though no vocals were recorded. This version was retitled "Song Within a Song" in medley with "Shortenin' Bread".

== "Happy Days" ==
In 1998, Wilson reworked the melody into the verse of a new song, "Happy Days", for his solo album Imagination.

== Personnel ==
Credits from Craig Slowinski

The Beach Boys

- Al Jardine - group vocals
- Bruce Johnston - group vocals
- Mike Love - group vocals
- Brian Wilson - group vocals, narration, Hammond organ, Moog synthesizers, drums
- Carl Wilson - group vocals, electric guitars (fed through a Moog)

== See also ==
- List of unreleased songs recorded by the Beach Boys
