= Cool, Cool Water =

1971 single by the Beach Boys

Single by the Beach Boys

from the album Sunflower
- B-side: "Forever"
- Released: March 1971
- Recorded: October 26, 1967 – July 7, 1970
- Studio: Beach Boys, Los Angeles
- Length: 5:03 (album version); 3:23 (single edit)
- Label: Brother/Reprise
- Songwriters: Brian Wilson, Mike Love
- Producer: The Beach Boys

The Beach Boys singles chronology
"Tears in the Morning" (1970)	"Cool, Cool Water" (1971)	"Wouldn't It Be Nice (live)" (1971)

Licensed audio
- "Cool, Cool Water" on YouTube

"Cool, Cool Water" is a song by the American rock band the Beach Boys from their 1970 album Sunflower. It was written by Brian Wilson and Mike Love and later issued as an A-sided single in March 1971.

The song evolved from "Love to Say Dada", an unfinished composition from the band's cancelled Smile album. Earlier versions of "Cool, Cool Water" were recorded during sessions for the 1967 albums Smiley Smile and Wild Honey. At the insistence of A&R man Lenny Waronker, the song was completed for Sunflower, with Moog synthesizer contributions from Paul Beaver.

Brian Wilson described "Cool, Cool Water" as "one of my very, very favorite songs that we ever did."

== Background ==
Engineer Stephen Desper stated that Brian Wilson had been obsessed with the riff of "Cool, Cool Water" for years prior to its release, and that the song had evolved from an earlier composition, "I Love to Say Dada". Wilson was quoted in the liner notes of a 2000 CD reissue:

I'm proud of "Cool, Cool Water" because that was a divinely inspired song. I had just moved into a new house on Bellagio Road in Bel Air, in March of 1967, and the first day I moved in, there was a piano there, and I went to the piano and wrote "Cool, Cool Water". I sat and wrote the gist of it, the basic song. It was finished much later of course.

== Recording ==
The recording sessions for "Cool, Cool Water" were held in June and October 1967, during the making of the Smiley Smile and Wild Honey albums. The song was listed as part of a proposed Wild Honey track listing dated October 13, 1967. It was ultimately excluded from the album.

In 1969, Lenny Waronker, then an A&R executive at Warner Music, heard the unfinished tape, and convinced Wilson to finish the track for Sunflower. Waronker was impressed with the song's inspired simplicity and stated "If I ever get the opportunity to produce Brian, I'd encourage him to do something that combined the vividness of 'Good Vibrations' with the non-commercial gentleness of 'Cool, Cool Water'." (Note: In 1988, Waronker realized this wish in "Rio Grande", a song he co-produced for Brian's debut solo album.)

A revised version of "Cool, Cool Water" was released on the band's 1970 album Sunflower, featuring new lyrics by Mike Love and an altered arrangement. Desper commented on Carl Wilson's role in the completion of "Cool, Cool Water" in a 2012 post,

There was no final version. When Brian became ill, Carl took over and salvaged a few tracks ... Almost all of CCW, the Sunflower version, was by Carl's production. ... Carl and the entire group was under a lot of pressure to record. Carl took what Brian had done (which was very little) and made it into the Sunflower CCW. That production was almost entirely original.

Wilson later said: "In 'Cool, Cool Water' there's a chant I wish we hadn't used. It fits all right, but there's just something I don't think is quite right with it." The chant also features as the intro to the Brian Wilson Presents Smile version of "Love to Say Dada" (renamed "In Blue Hawaii").

== Alternate edits ==
- In March 1971, "Cool, Cool Water" was released as an edited single, with the B-side of the single being "Forever". The truncated single edit was included on the group's 2007 compilation The Warmth of the Sun.
- In 2021, the compilation Feel Flows included an alternate edit prepared by Mark Linett. His colleague Alan Boyd explained, "it’s the exact same multi-track masters that they used, but putting an emphasis on different vocal parts than were used in the version on the original album."

== Personnel ==
Sourced from John Brode, Will Crerar, Joshilyn Hoisington, and Craig Slowinski.

The Beach Boys

- Al Jardine – harmony and backing vocals, group vocals, electric guitar, finger snaps
- Bruce Johnston – harmony and backing vocals, group vocals, bass guitar
- Mike Love – lead vocals, harmony and backing vocals, group vocals, finger snaps
- Brian Wilson – lead vocals, harmony and backing vocals, group vocals, grand and tack pianos (with taped strings), Baldwin organ, Moog synthesizer, bongos, finger snaps; producer
- Carl Wilson – harmony and backing vocals, group vocals, electric guitar, tambourine, finger snaps; producer
- Dennis Wilson – snare drum

Additional musicians and production staff

- Stephen Desper – Moog programming, engineer
- Paul Beaver – Moog programming
- Jim Lockert – engineer
- Bill Halverson – engineer
