= Take a Load Off Your Feet =

Song by the Beach Boys

from the album Surf's Up
- Released: August 30, 1971
- Recorded: January 1970 – early 1971
- Studio: Beach Boys, Los Angeles
- Genre: Progressive pop; folk
- Length: 2:29
- Label: Brother/Reprise
- Songwriters: Al Jardine, Brian Wilson, Gary Winfrey
- Producer: The Beach Boys

Licensed audio
- "Take a Load Off Your Feet" on YouTube

"Take a Load Off Your Feet" is a song by the American rock band the Beach Boys from their 1971 album Surf's Up. It was written by Al Jardine, Brian Wilson and Gary Winfrey.

== Background and recording ==
After completing his service obligation in the United States Air Force, Gary Winfrey returned to California in 1968. He and Al Jardine quickly rekindled a friendship that had begun back when both were in high school. Winfrey's wife Sandi was pregnant at the time, and her ankles were swollen. With the song "Hair" being popular at the time, somebody suggested writing a similar song about ankles. That song turned into "Take a Load Off Your Feet". Brian Wilson would later add some lyrics and help with the melody. Conversely, Jardine said of the song in a 1976 interview,

I was wearing Birkenstock sandals, and I read the instructions that came with them; it was inspiring to read about how important your feet are to the rest of your body. And so Brian and I got carried away. He'd come down at night and sit and play the bottles, these Sparklett's bottles we had lying around. He walked around on the roof - there was this skipping sound on the end of the song, you know, and that was Brian on the asphalt roof of the garage. Skipping around in a circle.

The first session for the song was during the Add Some Music sessions in January 1970. The song was then put on hold until the early part of the next year. All of the sessions were held at Brian Wilson's home studio. Brian did the lead vocal on the first verse and the bridge, while Jardine sang the remaining verses. Brian, Al and Carl Wilson, with help from Winfrey, sang the backing vocals, and Brian added sound effects including hitting an empty 5-gallon Sparklett's glass water container with a rubber mallet for percussion, footsteps and the horn of his Rolls-Royce Phantom V.

== Release ==
According to band manager Jack Rieley, Jardine "demanded" the song be included on the Surf's Up album, while Jardine said that the song appeared at Rieley's insistence. Jardine explained, "It's cute, but come on ... for some reason Jack Rieley liked it too and said, 'It's got to be on the album. That's definitely an ecology song.' 'Ecology? A song about your feet?' It's personal ecology."

A live version of the song, performed November 26, 1993 in New York City, appears on the band's 2021 box set Feel Flows. Prior to the box set's release, Jardine commented, "Wait until you hear the live version of 'Take a Load Off Your Feet'; it will blow your 'sandals' off! It is so damn good ... I almost fainted when I heard it. I didn't even remember performing it live. ... I've always hated the studio version of 'Take a Load Off Your Feet,' but now I LOVE it because of this live version. Isn't that funny?"

== Reception ==
Biographer Timothy White writes that the song is "a slice of social commentary about rundown bodies as well as sullied beaches, its droll sound effects succeeding where a more heavy-handed scolding would not have done."

== Personnel ==
Credits from Craig Slowinski

The Beach Boys

- Al Jardine - lead and backing vocals, acoustic guitar
- Brian Wilson - lead and backing vocals, Baldwin organ, bass guitar, floor tom w/ timpani mallet, water jug, tambourine, temple blocks, feet with sandals on asphalt roof, spoon on bowl, china plate, Rolls-Royce Phantom V
- Carl Wilson - backing vocals

Guest

- Gary Winfrey - backing vocals

Additional musicians

- Michel Colombier - string arrangement
- Sam Freed - violin
- David Frisina - violin
- Anatol Kaminsky - violin
- Nathan Kaproff - violin
- George Kast - violin
