= Sunflower (The Beach Boys album) =

Studio album by the Beach Boys
- Released: August 31, 1970
- Recorded: January 9, 1969 – July 21, 1970
- Studios: Beach Boys; Gold Star; Sunset Sound (Los Angeles)
- Genres: Soft rock; sunshine pop
- Length: 36:55
- Labels: Brother; Reprise
- Producer: The Beach Boys

The Beach Boys chronology
Live in London (1970)	Sunflower (1970)	Surf's Up (1971)

Singles from Sunflower
- 1. "Add Some Music to Your Day" Released: February 23, 1970; 2. "Slip On Through"" Released: June 29, 1970; 3. "Tears in the Morning"" Released: October 12, 1970; 4. "Cool, Cool Water"" Released: March 1, 1971

Sunflower is the sixteenth studio album by American rock band the Beach Boys. It was released by Reprise Records (the band's first for the label) on August 31, 1970, and received favorable reviews but sold poorly, reaching number 151 on the US record charts during a four-week stay and becoming the lowest-charting Beach Boys album to that point. "Add Some Music to Your Day" was the only single from the album to chart in the US, peaking at number 64. In the UK, the album peaked at number 29.

Working titles for the album included Reverberation, Add Some Music, and The Fading Rock Group Revival. The recording sessions began in January 1969, and, after a year-long search for a new record contract, completed in July 1970. In contrast to 20/20, the record featured a strong group presence with significant writing contributions from all band members. About four dozen songs were written for the album, and the label rejected numerous revisions of its track listing before the band presented enough formidable material deemed satisfactory for release. It includes "This Whole World", one of Brian Wilson's most complex songs, "Forever", regarded as among Dennis Wilson's finest, and "Cool, Cool Water", a song that originated from the band's Smile sessions.

Fans generally consider Sunflower to be among the Beach Boys' finest post-Pet Sounds albums. It has appeared in several critics' and listeners' polls for the best albums of all time, including Rolling Stone's 2003 list of the "500 Greatest Albums of All Time". The track "All I Wanna Do" was later cited as one of the earliest examples of dream pop. Many Sunflower outtakes and leftover songs later appeared on subsequent Beach Boys releases, including the follow-up Surf's Up (1971) and the compilation Feel Flows (2021).

== Background and recording ==
=== January – May 1969 ===
Sunflower is the truest group effort we'd ever had. Each of us was deeply involved in the creation of almost all the cuts. Someone would come down to the studio early and put down a basic track, and then someone else would arrive and think of a good line or overdub.

— Carl Wilson, 1970

The Beach Boys were at their lowest popularity in the late 1960s, and their cultural standing was especially worsened by their public image, which remained incongruous with the "heavier" music of their peers. Released by Capitol Records in February 1969, the band's newest album 20/20 sold better than their previous, Friends (1968). However, they remained encumbered by an enormous debt that had been partly the result of two disastrous tours in 1968. Recording sessions for their next album began in January 1969 and were produced by the Beach Boys collectively and by Brian Wilson and Carl Wilson, Bruce Johnston, Al Jardine, and Dennis Wilson individually. Throughout the year, they recorded about four dozen studio tracks, with working titles for the new album including Reverberation, Sun Flower, and Add Some Music.

On April 12, the Beach Boys filed suit against Capitol for unpaid royalties and production duties for $2 million (equivalent to $17.6 million in 2025). In a press statement for this news, they also announced that they would be reviving their Brother Records imprint. (Note: The label was initially founded during the Smile era and used only for two singles and the album Smiley Smile in 1967 before becoming dormant.) On April 16, Capitol A&R director Karl Engemaan drafted a letter to band manager Nick Grillo indicating that the group and label were still interested in renewing their contract. Engemaan asked the group to be ready to deliver the new album (then known under the working titles The Fading Rock Group Revival or Reverberation) by May 1. (Note: Badman states that although Bruce Johnston later denied that those were genuine titles, "Capitol documents name the proposed LP as The Fading Rock Group Revival or Reverberation.") Only seven of the ten tracks were completed by the deadline, and so the album was not delivered.

In 1969, Brian was increasingly known for his reclusiveness and eccentric behavior, which affected his reputation within the music industry. Grillo struggled to find another major label interested in signing the group, as he remembered, "Brian was notorious at that point" and label executives found the band too risky to sign. Since the Beach Boys remained highly popular in the UK, Grillo attempted to secure a foreign, worldwide contract with a European company. During the first half of 1969 the Beach Boys continued to tour, and increasingly engaged in benefit concerts held at hospitals and penitentiaries. (Note: There were also unrealized plans for the group to appear in a series of lucrative Coca-Cola commercials.)

=== May – October 1969 ===
On May 27, three days before the group embarked on a four-week tour of the UK and Europe, Brian told the music press that the group's funds were depleted to the point that they were considering filing for bankruptcy at the end of the year, which Disc & Music Echo called "stunning news" and a "tremendous shock on the American pop scene". (Note: According to Brian, the group had "to go on the road every two weeks to stay even" and that the charity concerts were "a kind of unofficial way" of paying off their debt to the US government after "allowing Carl to become a conscientious objector" in 1967. He also said that plans for Brother Records were "still in the talk stages" and that the company was "just a logo. ... it was [initially] formed because that was what we wanted to do artistically. But now it's an economic necessity.") In response, Grillo told reporters that Brian's comments were untrue and that he was "just putting you on". (Note: Band co-manager Fred Vail said in 2003 that "Brian might have been exaggerating a little bit from his perspective ... but the Beach Boys were in financial straits at the time.") Brian said he hoped that the success of a forthcoming single, "Break Away", would mend the band's financial issues. He wrote the song with his father and ex-band manager Murry Wilson. It was released on June 16 with the B-side "Celebrate the News", a Dennis song, and peaked at number 63 in the US and number 6 in the UK. During that summer, Brian focused his attention on launching the Radiant Radish, a health food store in West Hollywood. (Note: After the early 1969 sessions for "Break Away", Wilson was rarely in a studio until August, when he produced a spoken-word album with poet Stephen Kalinich, A World of Peace Must Come. The album was not released until 2008.)

From May 30 to June 30, the Beach Boys toured with Paul Revere & the Raiders and Joe Hicks. (Note: Bruce Johnston told the NME that he regretted the choice of supporting acts, "because [the Raiders] are a bubblegum kind of band. ... We wanted [our] group to happen in Europe, but we really should have taken Fairport Convention.") Their Capitol contract expired on June 30 with one more album still due, after which the label deleted the Beach Boys' catalog from print, effectively cutting off their royalty flow. (Note: The lawsuit was later settled in their favor and they acquired the rights to their post-1965 catalog.) Studio recording resumed sporadically from July to October amid numerous promotional appearances.

The Beach Boys expected that, since they were considered a "legendary band" by this point, many other labels would approach them with contractual offers, but few did. (Note: Capitol was still interested in working with the group and asked them to deliver an album by September, but the band wanted to extricate themselves from the label. In a 1969 interview, Carl expressed disappointment with Capitol's treatment of the band, as the label were not supportive of the group's artistic growth beyond "surfing or hot-rod records".) Throughout June, the group met with the Berlin-based company Deutsche Grammophon, who were keen to sign the band, but Brian's remarks in the press ultimately thwarted the contract negotiations. Polydor, Deutsche's American affiliate, also refused to sign the group because the company did not like the band's music or the members personally. CBS and MGM also rejected the band.

In August, the Manson Family committed the Tate–LaBianca murders. According to Jon Parks, the band's tour manager, it was widely suspected in the Hollywood community that Charles Manson was responsible for the murders, and it had been known that Manson had been involved with the Beach Boys, causing the band to be viewed as pariahs for a time. That same month, Carl, Dennis, Mike Love, and Jardine sought a permanent replacement for Johnston, approaching Carl's brother-in-law Billy Hinsche, who declined the offer in favor of focusing on his college studies. (Note: According to Badman, "It seems that Bruce is not informed that the group is looking to replace him.") In late 1969 (either reported as occurring in August or November), Murry Wilson sold the Sea of Tunes publishing company (including the rights to the majority of Brian's songs) to A&M Records' publishing division for $700,000 ($6.15 million in 2025).

=== November 1969 – July 1970 ===
According to music historian Keith Badman, a breakthrough with Warner Bros. Records inspired "an immense sense of optimism" and a "remarkable amount of new material" recorded in November 1969. He stated that the group, "including a temporarily rejuvenated Brian", prepared material with "as many songwriting collaborators as possible", for they regarded "the forthcoming album as a make-or-break disc". On November 18, Warner executive Mo Ostin agreed to sign the band to the company's subsidiary Reprise Records. This deal was brokered by Van Dyke Parks, a former collaborator of Brian's who was then employed as a multimedia executive at Warner Music Group. (Note: Parks said: "I'd pressured Mo to sign the beleaguered Beach Boys to the label, in spite of industry-wide reservations about the group's ability to deliver. ... Everyone at the label just wanted Brian Wilson to come over and write some songs.") The contract dealt by Reprise stipulated Brian's proactive involvement with the band in all albums. Another part of the deal was to revive Brother Records. (Note: Grillo explained: "Their career came first and Brother Records came second. He [Ostin] wanted the group to get back into the mainstream and, once that had happened, he'd develop the other artists on the label.")

Shortly before signing with Reprise, the group accumulated enough material for a new album, now titled Sun Flower, and assembled a provisional 14-song acetate for the label. (Note: The tracks were "Slip On Through", "Walkin'", "Forever", "Games Two Can Play", "Add Some Music to Your Day", "When Girls Get Together", "Our Sweet Love", "Tears in the Morning", "Back Home", "Fallin' in Love", "I Just Got My Pay", "Carnival", "Susie Cincinnati", and "Good Time".) This collection was rejected. Warner Bros. executive Dave Berson remembered: "It seemed like an amazing thing to do, to say to the Beach Boys, 'This is not the kind of an album we want to pay for.' Contractually, we didn't have any right to reject albums." The project was then renamed Add Some Music with the subheading An Album Offering from the Beach Boys.

From November 25 to December 7, the band embarked on their seventh and final annual Thanksgiving tour of the US. Badman called it "a dismal farewell" to the decade, "with audience members struggling to reach even a couple of hundred at some shows", forcing most of the dates to be cancelled. In November, the Manson family was apprehended by police for the Tate–LaBianca murders, and the family's former connections with Dennis and the Beach Boys became the subject of media attention.

In February 1970, the band submitted a version of Add Some Music, but were once again rejected. (Note: The track listing was as follows: Side one: "Susie Cincinnati", "Good Time", "Our Sweet Love", "Tears in the Morning", "When Girls Get Together", and "Slip On Through"; Side two: "Add Some Music to Your Day", "Take a Load Off Your Feet, Pete", "This Whole World", "I Just Got My Pay", "At My Window", "Fallin' in Love") The company felt that the proposed LP was not strong enough, although they decided to issue two of its tracks as a single, and asked the band to write and record a new batch of songs. From February to June, the group worked on overdubbing and rerecording some of their new material. Another revision was rejected in late May. The album's last two songs were finished in July: "Cool, Cool Water" and "It's About Time". After a July 21 overdubbing session for "Cool, Cool Water" with synthesizer player Bernie Krause, the third and final master of Sunflower was delivered to Warner.

== Songs ==
=== Side one ===
==== "Slip On Through" ====
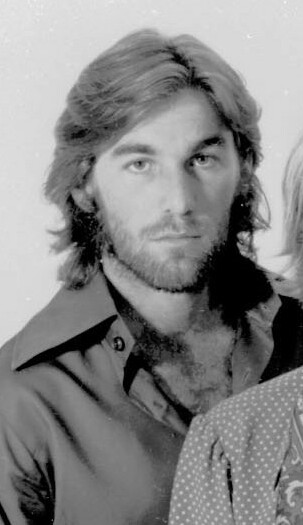
Dennis Wilson begins Sunflower with his co-written song "Slip On Through"

"Slip On Through" was written and sung by Dennis. Brian recalled, "It was a really dynamic song. Dennis, I was very proud of, because he really rocked and rolled on that one. Dennis did really interesting energetic things on that."

==== "This Whole World" ====
"This Whole World"
Biographer Timothy White deemed "This Whole World" a "mini-opus" with a "catch-in-the-throat vocal sob" from Carl Wilson.

"This Whole World" was written by Brian, who said it was "inspired by my love of the world, how I love people, and how people should be free." Carl sings lead vocals while Brian sings in the background; their voices were double-tracked, as was common practice for many of their recordings. Brian's wife Marilyn and her sister Diane Rovell also contributed backing vocals. Brian later produced a version of the song for their group American Spring on the 1972 album Spring. As a solo artist, he returned to the song again for the album I Just Wasn't Made for These Times (1995).

==== "Add Some Music to Your Day" ====
"Add Some Music to Your Day" is a song with lyrics about the celebration of music and its ubiquitous presence in daily life. It was written by Brian, Mike Love, and their friend Joe Knott, who was not a professional songwriter. Biographer Peter Ames Carlin wrote that the song was a "pop-folk tune" that "seemed like a perfect statement of purpose to lead off the band's second decade, given the tune's shared, round-robin style lead vocal, full background harmonies, and a plainspoken lyric".

==== "Got to Know the Woman" ====
"Got to Know the Woman" is an R&B song by Dennis that features backing vocals from female session singers. In White's words, it was "one of the few Beach Boys songs that could honestly be called funky, its tinkly Dixieland piano a perfect foil for the coarse frivolity of the verses, which contain a boorish come-on to the object of one's lowest bump-and-grind fantasies."

==== "Deirdre" ====
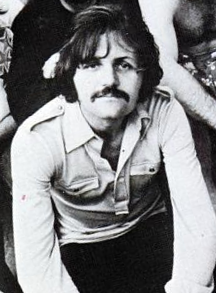
Bruce Johnston contributed the songs "Deirdre" and "Tears in the Morning".

"Deirdre" was credited to Bruce Johnston and Brian. Although Johnston has said that Brian only offered minor lyrical contributions and that he gave him a 50% share in the song as a favor, music historians Andrew G. Doe and John Tobler wrote in 2004 that the song had been "developed from a musical theme first used in 'We're Together Again,'" a 1968 composition credited to Brian Wilson and singer Ron Wilson (no relation). The song was named after the sister of one of Johnston's ex-girlfriends and was described by White as "a stroll-tempo devotional to an idealized, red-haired goddess; its stippled use of flutes plus the spacey filtering and compression techniques in the vocal mixes giving the track a celestial grandeur." In 1994, the song was sampled in the video game EarthBound.

==== "It's About Time" ====
"It's About Time" is an autobiographical rock song about the pitfalls of stardom and fame. It was primarily written by Dennis and outside writer Bob Burchman (a close friend of Dennis's second wife, Barbara), with co-writers Carl and Jardine adding various refinements during the recording process. Jardine said: "'It's About Time'" was Carl, Dennis and I. That's a good one. I like that production. That was mostly Dennis, and I just helped with the lyrics. Dennis and Carl did the track." White describes the song as a "commentary on rock indulgence and self-redemption, it was also a wishful scenario regarding both Brian and Dennis Wilson's sporadic personal troubles."

=== Side two ===
==== "Tears in the Morning" ====
"Tears in the Morning", written by Johnston, is a melodramatic song with strings, horns, and accordions. As Disc & Echo writer reviewed after a concert in December 1970, "I must admit, it went down a storm, as the song benefited from the simple piano-voice presentation. But if you'd seen the expressions and heard the mutterings of the others in the group as they were ordered off-stage, it looked decidedly as though Bruce could find himself in the doghouse!"

==== "All I Wanna Do" ====
"All I Wanna Do"
Production for "All I Wanna Do" has been described by Rolling Stone as "mind-wrenching" and "proto-shoegaze" by Pitchfork.

"All I Wanna Do" is a reverb-heavy B. Wilson–Love song that was originally attempted during the sessions for Friends. Retrospective commentators note the song as one of the earliest examples of chillwave, a microgenre that emerged in the 2000s. Discussing the song in 1995, Brian expressed: "That was one of those songs that had a nice chord pattern, but I think it was a boring song, and I thought it wasn't done right. I thought it should have been softer, with boxed guitars."

==== "Forever" ====
"Forever" was written by Dennis and his friend Gregg Jakobson. Brian praised the song as "the most harmonically beautiful thing I've ever heard. It's a rock and roll prayer." Love wrote that it "was Dennis's most acclaimed ballad, as it captured the raw emotion and bluesy sensibility that he brought to his vocals."

==== "Our Sweet Love" ====
"Our Sweet Love" is a reworking of a Friends outtake, "Our New Home". Brian commented: "I wrote that for Carl. After I wrote it I said, 'Hey, he could sing this good' so I gave it to Carl." According to Jardine, Brian refused to complete the song: "'Our Sweet Love' was one we finished with Brian. He just didn't want to finish it. So we kind of helped. We became completers of ideas."

==== "At My Window" ====
"At My Window" is a song by Brian and Jardine about the birds in Brian's backyard. It evolved from a rendition of "Raspberry, Strawberries", a Wilt Holt composition that was recorded by the Kingston Trio. The lyrics were written by Jardine. He commented: "That was probably one of my first efforts at involving the other guys. ... I have this dim recollection of writing it and Bruce singing it and Brian trying to speak French in it. It had a nice tone to it. We had an accordion player come in and play some beautiful things on it."

==== "Cool, Cool Water" ====
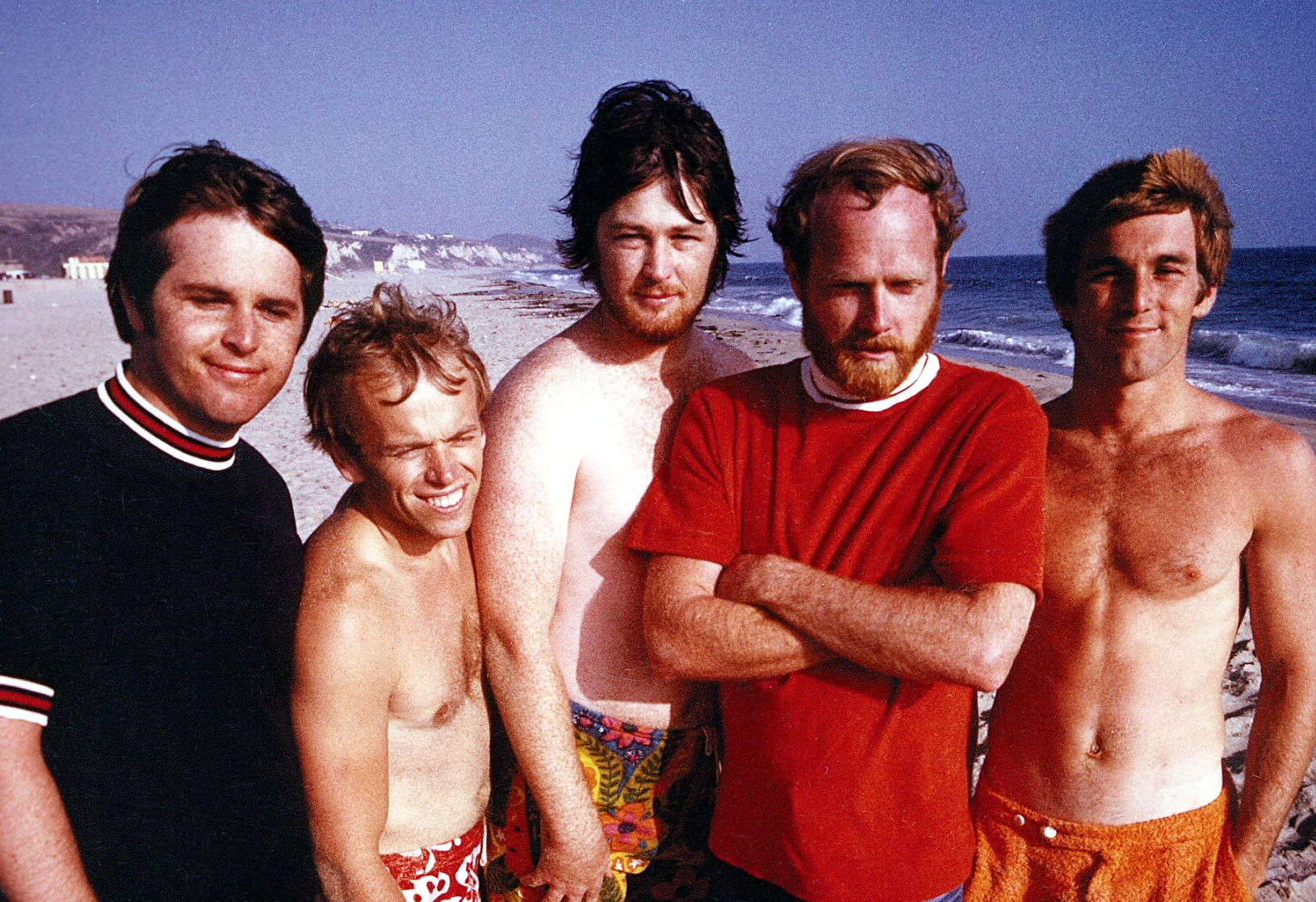
The Beach Boys in July 1967, around the time they first tried to record "Cool, Cool Water"

"Cool, Cool Water" evolved from the Smile track "Love to Say Dada" and was initially attempted during the 1967 sessions for Smiley Smile and Wild Honey. Lenny Waronker, then an A&R executive at Warner Music Group, heard the unfinished tape, and convinced Wilson to finish the track for Sunflower. Waronker was so impressed with the song's inspired simplicity, that he noted, "If I ever get the opportunity to produce Brian, I'd encourage him to do something that combined the vividness of 'Good Vibrations' with the non-commercial gentleness of 'Cool, Cool Water.'" (Note: In 1988, Waronker realized this wish in "Rio Grande", a song he co-produced for Brian's debut solo album.) Wilson later said: "In 'Cool, Cool Water' there's a chant I wish we hadn't used. It fits all right, but there's just something I don't think is quite right with it."

=== Leftover ===
Around three dozen songs were left off Sunflower. Each member of the band, including Brian, wrote numerous songs for the album. Brian alone had about a full-length album's worth of material that he had written by himself or with collaborators. Among these, "Where Is She?" is a Brian song that, according to band archivist Alan Boyd, resembles the Beatles' "She's Leaving Home". He said: "It's one of those times that the band's engineer Steve Desper recalls Brian simply getting an idea and he built this song from the ground up." (Note: It was released on the 2013 compilation Made in California.)In 2013, "Where Is She" was released on the box set Made In California. "Take a Load Off Your Feet (Pete)", written by Brian and Jardine with schoolfriend Gary Winfrey, was included on the band's next album Surf's Up (1971). "Loop de Loop", written by Brian, Carl, and Jardine, was the latter's rearrangement of "Sail Plane Song", a 20/20 Brian/Carl outtake. In 1998, Jardine completed the song for the Endless Harmony Soundtrack with the original 1969 mix seeing release on the 2021 box set Feel Flows. The former compilation also included "Soulful Old Man Sunshine", a collaboration between Brian, Rick Henn (former leader of the Sunrays) and veteran arranger/producer Don Ralke.

"Lady" was written by Dennis and featured a string arrangement by keyboardist Daryl Dragon. The song was later considered for Surf's Up but passed for inclusion. Instead, in December 1970, Wilson released it as the B-side of the "Sound of Free" single, credited to "Dennis Wilson & Rumbo". "Good Time" was a collaboration between Brian and Jardine. In 1972, American Spring recorded versions of "Lady" (with the new title "Fallin' in Love") and "Good Time", the latter with new vocals overdubbed onto the Beach Boys' original backing track, for their album Spring. In 1977, the original Sunflower version of "Good Time" was placed on The Beach Boys Love You. In 1981, "San Miguel", a collaboration between Dennis and Gregg Jakobson, was released for the compilation Ten Years of Harmony. Jardine's "Susie Cincinnati" was released as the B-side of the "Add Some Music to Your Day" single and as a track on the 1976 album 15 Big Ones.

"I Just Got My Pay" is a song that contains a reworked melody from the 1964 outtake "All Dressed Up for School", with both songs being released on the 1993 box set Good Vibrations: Thirty Years of the Beach Boys. "I'm Going Your Way" is a Dennis song about picking up hitchhikers and the sexual intercourse that might follow while "Carnival" (aka "Over the Waves") is a wordless vocal rendition of the standard "When You Are in Love (It's the Loveliest Night of the Year)". Both songs were released on the 2021 box set Feel Flows. Also recorded was "When Girls Get Together" (released on the 1980 album Keepin' the Summer Alive), "Games Two Can Play" (released on the 1993 box set Good Vibrations: Thirty Years of the Beach Boys), "Back Home" (a version different from the one released on 15 Big Ones), a solo piano demo of "Til I Die" with no vocals (later completed for Surf's Up), and a keyboard-only version of the Beatles' "You Never Give Me Your Money". The latter two recordings were released on the 2021 box set Feel Flows.

== Release ==
On February 23, 1970, "Add Some Music to Your Day" (B-side "Susie Cincinnati") was issued as the lead single. Reprise was so excited about the record that they convinced retailers to carry more copies of it than of any other artist on their roster ever. This made it the fastest-selling 45 rpm record in the label's history. In March, Love was hospitalized after a three-week fast in which he ate only water, fruit juice, and yogurt – per the teachings of Maharishi Mahesh Yogi. Brian replaced Love on the road during this period. He remembered: "When Mike Love was sick, I went with the group up to Seattle and Vancouver and the Northwest for some appearances. I was scared for a few minutes in the first show—it had been a while since I was in front of so many people. But after it started to cook I really got with it. It was the best three days of my life, I guess."

In April, "Add Some Music to Your Day" peaked at number 64 in the US during a five-week stay. DJs generally refused to play the song on the radio. According to band promoter Fred Vail, WFIL program director Jay Cook refused to play the song even after "telling me how great the Beach Boys are and how great Brian is." On April 17, the regular touring band, with Love, embarked on their first major tour of the year: a four-week trek of New Zealand and Australia. Supporting musicians for this tour included bassist Ed Carter and keyboardist Daryl Dragon. Murry Wilson also accompanied the group for this tour. (Note: According to Badman, Murry pleaded that the band wear matching white stage uniforms. Instead, they wore casual clothes.) Australian magazine Go Set reported that the band's next album was titled Cool Water and that Emerald Films would be creating a color film documentary of the tour, produced by the BBC's Steve Turner.

None of the album's other singles charted in the US or UK. Due to the poor response to the lead single, Warner suggested that the band refrain from calling the new album Add Some Music. In late June, Brian told Melody Maker that he was thinking about composing the soundtrack to an Andy Warhol film about a "gay surfer". On June 29, the second single "Slip On Through" (B-side "This Whole World") was issued in the US. Love wrote in his 2016 memoir that "Warner/Reprise was adrift on how to position Sunflower" and that the band had "thought about shortening [our] name to 'Beach' but concluded that was even worse."

On August 31, 1970, Sunflower was released in the US by Brother/Reprise. At the time, Brian told Rolling Stone: "I think we threw away at least one good song on [Sunflower]. Overall, the record is good, but it doesn't please me as much as I wish. ... But all in all, with some good airplay, the record should do very well." The album became the Beach Boys' worst-selling to date, reaching number 151 on US record charts during a four-week stay. Its failure was attributed partly to the fact that FM rock radio DJs considered the songs too conventional for their playlists. Biographer David Leaf wrote that the sales numbers were greatly disappointing for the Beach Boys, and that Brian was especially affected: "That, on top of the old, unhealed scars, was a hurt he didn't really begin to get over until 1976."

In the UK, Sunflower was released in November 1970, on Stateside Records, and peaked at number 29. A British trade magazine reported: "The album has been out less than one week, and it already is indicated to be their most popular recording in history, according to EMI Records." However, the album continued to sell poorly. Two more US singles, "Tears in the Morning" (B-side "It's About Time") and "Cool, Cool Water" (B-side "Forever"), followed on October 21, 1970, and March 1971, respectively. The former was released in November 1970 as their only UK single.

== Contemporary reviews ==
Despite its poor sales, Sunflower received considerable critical acclaim in the US and the UK. In his review for Rolling Stone, Jim Miller called it "without doubt the best Beach Boys album in recent memory, a stylistically coherent tour de force", but mused: "It makes one wonder though whether anyone still listens to their music, or could give a shit about it." Following Miller's review, several other American magazines published favorable assessments, but as Badman writes, "The damage done by their non-appearance at [the] Monterey [Pop Festival] in 1967 seem[ed] irreversible among rock's opinion-formers."

The Village Voice's Robert Christgau said that as a coming-of-age record from the Beach Boys, Sunflower is "far more satisfying, I suspect, than Smile ever would have been". He added that the "same medium-honest sensibility" and Southern California ethos of their 1960s music remains, "only now they sing about broken marriages and the pleasure of life. Still a lot of fun too." In the English music press, the album was favorably compared by many critics to the Beatles' Sgt. Pepper's Lonely Hearts Club Band.

== Retrospective assessments and legacy ==
Retrospective professional reviews
Review scores
Source	Rating
AllMusic	4.5/5 stars
Blender	4/5 stars
Christgau's Record Guide	A−
Entertainment Weekly	B+
Encyclopedia of Popular Music	5/5 stars
MusicHound Rock	3.5/5
Pitchfork (Sunflower/Surf's Up reissue)	8.9/10
The Rolling Stone Album Guide	5/5 stars
Sputnikmusic	5/5

Fans generally regard Sunflower as the Beach Boys' finest post-Pet Sounds album. Pitchfork's Hefner Macauley deemed Sunflower "perhaps the strongest album they released post-Pet Sounds", while Chris Holmes of Popdose declared that "it stands as the definitive post-Pet Sounds Beach Boys album". Paste's Brian Chidester wrote that the album "was, in many respects, their Abbey Road—a lush production that signaled an end to the 1960s, the decade that gave them creative flight." Music theorist Daniel Harrison referred to Sunflower as the end of an experimental songwriting and production epoch for the group, one that had begun with 1967's Smiley Smile.

In his 2016 memoir, Love acknowledged that Sunflower was "damn good ... I also know that we have fans who cherish that album like none other." Wilson biographer Christian Matijas-Mecca stated that the album was the band's best effort since Pet Sounds and said that it "demonstrated, more than any other Beach Boys album before or since, that the six members could work democratically and deliver songs of real depth." Writing in The Beach Boys and the California Myth (1978), David Leaf summarized the work as "the first album that could come close to Pet Sounds on a production level, partly the result of studio engineer Steve Desper's fine work. The Beach Boys' harmonies were present in a way they hadn't been since Summer Days... and it was probably the truest group effort ever in that it was a showcase for all the individuals in the band." Peter Ames Carlin summarized:

Despite the fact that they were emerging from the darkest years of their commercial and personal lives, the group had produced a collection of songs that projected their utopian fantasies into a modern, adult context. The band's individual voices were more distinct than ever, but the rainbow of personalities still folded together into a sound that was sweet, surprisingly sexy, and, as ever, musically inventive.

Sunflower was voted number 380 in Rolling Stone's "500 Greatest Albums of All Time" (2003), number 66 in The Guardian's "100 Best Albums Ever" (1997), and number 449 in Colin Larkin's All Time Top 1000 Albums (2000). In his review of the album's 2000 remaster, Keith Phipps from The A.V. Club said that Sunflower "features one of The Beach Boys' most coherent and lovely selections of music", with the best songs penned by Brian. The A.V. Club's Noel Murray wrote that the album could be interpreted as the band's response to "the wave of 'sunshine pop' and 'bubblegum' acts that had emerged over the previous couple of years, showing that no one could write and record slick, melodic, harmony-drenched songs quite like The Beach Boys."

Among the band members, Bruce Johnston later named Sunflower his favorite Beach Boys album. In the 1970s, he considered it to be the last true Beach Boys album because it was the last to feature Brian's input and active involvement. He nonetheless regretted the inclusion of his two songs, saying that "Tears in the Morning" was "too pop" and that "I wish I hadn't recorded ['Deirdre'] with the group." Conversely, Brian said that "Deirdre" was "one of my very favorites" and that "Tears in the Morning" was "lovely". For the album's 2000 liner notes, it was written that he "attributes the staying power of Sunflower ... to the 'spiritual love' of the music".

== Track listing ==
=== Original release ===
Side one
No.	Title	Writer(s)	Lead vocal(s)	Length
1.	"Slip On Through"	Dennis Wilson; Gregg Jakobson	Dennis Wilson	2:17
2.	"This Whole World"	Brian Wilson	Carl Wilson	1:56
3.	"Add Some Music to Your Day"	B. Wilson; Joe Knott; Mike Love	Mike Love, Bruce Johnston, C. Wilson, Brian Wilson, and Al Jardine	3:34
4.	"Got to Know the Woman"	D. Wilson; Jakobson	D. Wilson	2:41
5.	"Deirdre"	Bruce Johnston; B. Wilson	Johnston with B. Wilson	3:27
6.	"It's About Time"	D. Wilson; Carl Wilson; Bob Burchman; Al Jardine	C. Wilson with Love	2:55

Side two
No.	Title	Writer(s)	Lead vocal(s)	Length
1.	"Tears in the Morning"	Johnston	Johnston	4:07
2.	"All I Wanna Do"	B. Wilson; Love	Love	2:34
3.	"Forever"	D. Wilson; Jakobson	D. Wilson	2:40
4.	"Our Sweet Love"	B. Wilson; C. Wilson; Jardine	C. Wilson	2:38
5.	"At My Window"	Jardine; B. Wilson	Johnston with B. Wilson	2:30
6.	"Cool, Cool Water"	B. Wilson; Love	B. Wilson and Love	5:03
Total length:				36:55

Notes

- The international version of the LP had "Cottonfields" as the first track on side one.
- "Slip On Through" and "Got to Know the Woman" were originally credited to Dennis Wilson alone. Following a consultation with Wilson's estate and publishing, credits to Gregg Jakobson were officially added in 2021.

=== Reverberation ===
Midway through the recording of Sunflower, the band assembled an album for Capitol with some tracks that were later placed on Sunflower. It had the working title of Reverberation. Although a master tape (dated June 19, 1970) of songs was put together, this album was never released. Instead, they fulfilled their contract with the May 1970 album Live in London. All of the following tracks have seen an official release in later years.

"Last Capitol Album" (Reverberation)
No.	Title	Length
1.	"Cottonfields" (single version)
2.	"Loop de Loop"
3.	"All I Wanna Do"
4.	"Got to Know the Woman" (mono mix)
5.	"When Girls Get Together" (instrumental)
6.	"Break Away"
7.	"San Miguel"
8.	"Celebrate the News"
9.	"Deirdre"
10.	"The Lord's Prayer" (duophonic remix)
11.	"Forever"

=== Feel Flows ===
In 2021, expanded editions of Sunflower and Surf's Up were packaged within Feel Flows, a box set that includes session highlights, outtakes, and alternate mixes drawn from the two albums.

== Personnel ==
Sourced from John Brode, Will Crerar, Joshilyn Hoisington, and Craig Slowinski.

The Beach Boys

- Al Jardine – second tenor/baritone vocals, electric guitar, finger snaps
- Bruce Johnston – second tenor/first tenor vocals, bass guitar, Rocksichord, piano
- Mike Love – bass vocals; finger snaps
- Brian Wilson – first tenor vocals, piano, Rocksichord, toy piano, organ, Moog synthesizer, bongos, finger snaps
- Carl Wilson – second tenor vocals, electric guitar, acoustic guitar, Chamberlin, bass guitar, Rocksichord, electric sitar, clavinet, tambourine, finger snaps, additional percussion
- Dennis Wilson – baritone/bass vocals, piano, guitar, drums, bongos, cowbell (uncertain credit), tambourine

Touring musicians

- Ed Carter – guitar
- Daryl Dragon – organ, vibraphone, tack piano, electric harpsichord, tubular bells, chimes, bass guitar
- Dennis Dragon – drums, congas, cowbells, timbales

Guest

- Carnie Wilson – background voice on “At My Window”

Additional session musicians

- Julia Tillman – backing vocals
- Carolyn Willis – backing vocals
- Edna Wright – backing vocals
- Al Casey, David Cohen, Jerry Cole – guitar
- Ronald Benson – guitar, mandolin
- Mike Anthony – electric guitar
- James Burton – acoustic guitar
- Jack Conrad – guitar, bass guitar
- Ray Pohlman – six-string bass, bass
- Jimmy Bond – double bass, electric bass
- Mort Klanfer, Joe Osborn, Lyle Ritz – bass guitar
- Larry Knechtel, Mike Melvoin – piano
- Gene Estes – drums, chimes, glockenspiel, shaker
- Hal Blaine, John Guerin, Earl Palmer – drums
- Frank Capp – tambourine, tympani
- Stan Levey – bass drum, cowbell
- John Audino – trumpet
- Tony Terran – trumpet
- Carl Fortina – French concertina
- Igor Horoshevsky – cello
- Red Rhodes – pedal steel guitar
- Paul Beaver, Bernard Krause – Moog synthesizer
- Jay Migliori – flute
- David Sherr – flute
- Anatol Kaminsky – violin
- Sam Freed – violin
- Marvin Limonick – violin
- David Frisina – violin
- George Kast – violin
- Nathan Kaproff – violin
- Alexander Murray – violin
- Dorothy Wade – violin
- Spiro Stamos – violin
- Roy Tanabe – violin
- Shari Zippert – violin
- Jay Rosen – violin
- Virginia Majewski – viola
- Robert Ostrowsky – viola
- Alvin Dinkin – viola
- Allan Harstian – viola
- Edgar Lustgarten – cello
- Abe Luboff – arco double bass

Technical and production staff

- Stephen Desper – chief engineer and mixer, Moog synthesizer, wave effects, additional vocals (uncertain credit)
- Bill Lazarus – additional engineer (“Got to Know the Woman”)
- Doc Siegel – additional engineer (“Deirdre”, “All I Wanna Do”, “Forever”)
- Jim Lockert – additional engineer (“Cool, Cool Water”)
- Bill Halverson – additional engineer (“Cool, Cool Water”)
- Ricci Martin – cover photo
- Ed Thrasher – original art direction, innerspread photography

== Charts ==
=== Weekly charts ===
Weekly chart performance for Sunflower
Chart (1970–1971)	Peak position
Canada Top Albums/CDs (RPM)	79
Dutch Albums (Album Top 100)	10
UK Albums (Official Charts)	29
US Billboard 200	151

=== Year-end charts ===
Year-end chart performance for Sunflower
Chart (1971)	Position
Dutch Albums (Album Top 100)	73

== Bibliography ==
- Badman, Keith (2004). The Beach Boys: The Definitive Diary of America's Greatest Band, on Stage and in the Studio. Backbeat Books. ISBN 978-0-87930-818-6.
- Bogdanov, Vladimir; Woodstra, Chris; Erlewine, Stephen Thomas, eds. (2002). All Music Guide to Rock: The Definitive Guide to Rock, Pop, and Soul. Backbeat Books. ISBN 978-0-87930-653-3.
- Carlin, Peter Ames (2006). Catch a Wave: The Rise, Fall, and Redemption of the Beach Boys' Brian Wilson. Rodale. ISBN 978-1-59486-320-2.
- Gaines, Steven (1986). Heroes and Villains: The True Story of The Beach Boys (1. Da Capo Press ed.). New York: Da Capo Press. ISBN 0306806479.
- Leaf, David (1978). The Beach Boys and the California Myth. New York: Grosset & Dunlap. ISBN 978-0-448-14626-3.
- Love, Mike (2016). Good Vibrations: My Life as a Beach Boy. Penguin Publishing Group. ISBN 978-0-698-40886-9.
- Matijas-Mecca, Christian (2017). The Words and Music of Brian Wilson. ABC-CLIO. ISBN 978-1-4408-3899-6.
- Schinder, Scott (2007). "The Beach Boys". In Schinder, Scott; Schwartz, Andy (eds.). Icons of Rock: An Encyclopedia of the Legends Who Changed Music Forever. Westport, Connecticut: Greenwood Press. ISBN 978-0313338458.
- Wilson, Brian; Greenman, Ben (2016). I Am Brian Wilson: A Memoir. Da Capo Press. ISBN 978-0-306-82307-7.
