= Tears in the Morning =

- 7" vinyl Swedish single cover

Single by the Beach Boys

from the album Sunflower
- B-side: "It's About Time"
- Released: October 12, 1970
- Recorded: November 18, 1969 – January 28, 1970
- Genre: Adult contemporary; pop
- Length: 4:07
- Label: Brother/Reprise
- Songwriter: Bruce Johnston
- Producer: The Beach Boys

The Beach Boys singles chronology
"Slip On Through" (1970)	"Tears in the Morning" (1970)	"Cool, Cool Water" (1971)

"Tears in the Morning" is a song by the American rock band the Beach Boys from their 1970 album Sunflower. Written by Bruce Johnston, it was issued as a single, with the B-side "It's About Time". The single failed to chart in the U.S., but reached the top 5 in the Netherlands.

== Personnel ==
Sourced from Craig Slowinski and Timothy White.

The Beach Boys

- Al Jardine – harmony and backing vocals
- Bruce Johnston – lead vocals, harmony and backing vocals, Rocksichord, grand piano (during coda), production
- Mike Love – harmony and backing vocals
- Brian Wilson – harmony and backing vocals
- Carl Wilson – harmony and backing vocals, guitar

Additional musicians

- Ronald Benson – guitar, mandolin
- Ray Pohlman – bass
- Daryl Dragon – vibraphone
- Hal Blaine – drums
- Carl Fortina – French concertina
- Igor Horoshevsky – cello
- Anatol Kaminsky, Sam Freed, Marvin Limonick, David Frisina, George Kast, Nathan Kaproff, Alexander Murray, Dorothy Wade – violins
- Virginia Majewski, Robert Ostrowsky, Alvin Dinkin, Allan Harstian – violas
- Edgar Lustgarten – cello
- Abe Luboff – arco double bass
- unknown – trombone

Production staff

- Michel Colombier – arranger
- Stephen Desper – engineer

== Cover versions ==
- Belgian pop band the Radios covered the song in their 1990 album No Television.
- Norwegian stoner rock band Thulsa Doom recorded a cover version of this song in 2005 for their album Keyboard, Oh Lord! Why Don't We?
- Dutch coverband Beach Boys' Best covered this song in 2025 in the 5th season of the Dutch TV show The Tribute: Battle of the Bands. The same year, the song returns in the Dutch Top2000 after three years of absence, on position 404; the highest ranking ever in this chart.

== Charts ==
Chart (1971)	Peak position
Dutch GfK chart	4
Dutch Top 40	6
US Record World	117

Dutch Top2000
Year	2025	2024	2023	2022	2021	2020	2019	2018	2017	2016	2015	2014	2013	2012	2011	2010	2009	2008	2007	2006	2005	2004	2003	2002	2001	2000	1999
Position	404	-	-	-	1920	1879	1906	1749	1101	1184	1334	997	1048	1433	768	618	632	629	775	789	607	578	448	508	406	470	453
