= Beach Boys Studio =

Former recording studio in Los Angeles

Coordinates: 34°4′51.12″N 118°26′19.51″W

The Beach Boys at their studio during the 1969 sessions for Sunflower. From left: Dennis and Brian Wilson, Mike Love (back), and Carl Wilson (front).

Beach Boys Studio (also known as Brother Records Studio, Brother Recording Studio, and 10452 Bellagio Road) was a private recording studio owned by the Beach Boys. It was located within Brian Wilson's home at 10452 Bellagio Road in Los Angeles. Six of the band's albums were recorded there in addition to his "Bedroom Tapes". In 1972, the studio was dismantled and later succeeded by Brother Studios in Santa Monica, California.

== Background ==
The studio was built in 1967 due to various issues Wilson regularly experienced when working at commercial studios, such as being hassled by owners for touching the control board (a violation of union regulations), as well as to eliminate the inconvenience of booking time in advance.

It is sometimes referred to as "Brian Wilson's home studio". Band engineer Stephen Desper said that the studio was funded and intended for use by everyone in the group, not just Wilson, and disputed its characterization as "Brian's studio". Because his bandmates took much of the recording equipment with them when they left for concert tours, Wilson was not typically allowed to use the home studio unless the band was present.

== Technical details ==
Recording capabilities at Wilson's Los Angeles residence were made possible by his band and engineer Stephen Desper in the midst of recording Smiley Smile in mid-1967. For the first few months of operation, the makeshift studio was installed with a Gates Dualux radio broadcasting console as the quick recording of Smiley Smile didn't allow enough time to acquire a conventional mixing board. By the recording of Friends in early 1968, the studio continued to use the Dualux console yet the rest of the chauffeur's quarters had been converted to feature a more permanent set-up. In October 1969, the console was upgraded to a 16-track recorder with quadraphonic capability. From 1967, until its dismantling in late 1972 by Marilyn Wilson, the studio recorded a mix of artists with personal ties to the Beach Boys, including American Spring, The Flames, Stephen Kalinich and Charles Manson.

== Dismantling ==
The studio was dismantled by Wilson's then-wife Marilyn in mid-1972. Wilson later remarked, "If I could have anything in the world, I'd have a studio in my house again. That's the one thing I want more than anything!"

== Sessions ==
Session dates	Artist	Associated project
Mid-1967	The Beach Boys	Smiley Smile
Late-1967	The Beach Boys	Wild Honey
Early-1968	The Beach Boys	Friends
Mid-1968	Charles Manson	Various recordings
Late-1969	Stephen Kalinich	A World of Peace Must Come
1969/1970	The Beach Boys	Sunflower
1970/1971	The Beach Boys	Surf's Up
1970	The Flame	The Flame
Late-1971	Dennis Wilson	Unreleased solo album
1971/1972	Spring	Spring
1971/1972	The Beach Boys	Carl and the Passions – "So Tough"
