= Stephen Desper =

Stephen W. Desper
- Occupation: Sound engineer
- Website: http://swdstudyvideos.com/index.html (Archive)

Stephen W. Desper is an American audio engineer who is best known for his work with the Beach Boys and for inventing the Spatializer. The Spatializer is an effects unit which employs psychoacoustic techniques that emulate three-dimensional ambience via traditional stereophonic units, and can be heard in the Bonnie Raitt album Longing in Their Hearts (1994).

Desper was also the house engineer for the Monterey Pop Festival in June 1967. Through the Beach Boys subsidiary American Productions, the band loaned their touring sound system to the festival. He accompanied the equipment from the Beach Boys storage warehouse up the coast with band road manager Jon Parks and ended up mixing the house system for the entire three-day festival.

== Engineering credits ==
The Beach Boys

- Smiley Smile (1967)
- Wild Honey (1967)
- Friends (1968)
- 20/20 (1969)
- Live in London (1970)
- Sunflower (1970)
- Surf's Up (1971)
- 15 Big Ones (1976) - "Susie Cincinnati" only
- The Beach Boys Love You (1977) - "Good Time" only
- Keepin' the Summer Alive (1980)
