= Ten Years of Harmony =

Greatest hits album by The Beach Boys
- Released: December 7, 1981
- Recorded: Autumn 1969 – February 1980; Except: "Surf's Up": backing track recorded November 1966
- Genre: Rock
- Length: 90:26
- Label: Brother, Caribou, CBS
- Producer: The Beach Boys, Brian Wilson, James William Guercio, Bruce Johnston (Except "River Song": Dennis Wilson and Gregg Jakobson)

The Beach Boys chronology
Keepin' the Summer Alive (1980)	Ten Years of Harmony (1981)	Sunshine Dream (1982)

Professional ratings
Review scores
Source	Rating
AllMusic	4/5 stars
MusicHound	3/5

Ten Years of Harmony is an official double album compilation album released by the Beach Boys in 1981, and spanning their entire Brother Records-era up to that point (1970–80), including some unreleased or rare material. Although the song "Darlin'" had originally been recorded in 1967 while the group was signed to Capitol Records, the version on Ten Years of Harmony was recorded live in 1973 for the album The Beach Boys in Concert.

The Beach Boys had more or less splintered in 1981. Far from lucid, Brian Wilson would occasionally appear on stage, primarily as a replacement for brother Carl, who was embarking on a solo career. Dennis Wilson would show up to occasional concerts, but would usually be argumentative and disruptive. Mike Love, Al Jardine and Bruce Johnston were the only stable members of a band who now had a whole cast of supporting musicians when they performed live. However, the release of Ten Years of Harmony kept the pretense going and, unexpectedly, the M.I.U. Album cover of "Come Go with Me" became a US top-twenty hit when released as a single from this collection.

While taking tracks from 1970s Sunflower to 1980s Keepin' the Summer Alive, the compilers also included some oddities, rarities, and unreleased tracks. First, a handful of the songs, namely "Rock and Roll Music" and "California Saga: California" are presented in their original single mix. Early CD pressings of the album also included an early alternate version of "Come Go with Me." Moreover, Ten Years of Harmony includes a 1979 A-side "It's a Beautiful Day" (which failed to chart), a Dennis Wilson-written track called "San Miguel" (which was a Sunflower-era outtake from 1969), a cover of "Sea Cruise", which was a rejected track from the 15 Big Ones sessions, and a selection from Dennis' solo album, Pacific Ocean Blue, "River Song".

Only Beach Boys who were active throughout the whole decade (Al Jardine, Mike Love, Brian Wilson, Carl Wilson, and Dennis Wilson) appear on the gatefold cover on the original LP issue.

Ten Years of Harmony, now out of print, sold enough in its release to reach number 156 in the US.

== Track listing ==
Side one
No.	Title	Writer(s)	Original release	Length
1.	"Add Some Music to Your Day"	Brian Wilson, Mike Love, Joe Knott	Sunflower, 1970	3:34
2.	"Roller Skating Child"	B. Wilson	The Beach Boys Love You, 1977	2:16
3.	"Disney Girls (1957)"	Bruce Johnston	Surf's Up, 1971	4:06
4.	"It's a Beautiful Day"	Love, Al Jardine	non-album single, 1979	3:15
5.	"California Saga: California"	Jardine	Holland, 1973	3:13
6.	"Wontcha Come Out Tonight"	B. Wilson, Love	M.I.U. Album, 1978	2:29
7.	"Marcella"	B. Wilson, Tandyn Almer, Jack Rieley	Carl and the Passions – "So Tough", 1972	3:52
Total length:				22:45

Side two
No.	Title	Writer(s)	Original release	Length
1.	"Rock and Roll Music"	Chuck Berry	15 Big Ones, 1976	2:26
2.	"Goin' On"	B. Wilson, Love	Keepin' the Summer Alive, 1980	3:01
3.	"It's OK"	B. Wilson, Love	15 Big Ones, 1976	2:08
4.	"Cool, Cool Water"	B. Wilson, Love	Sunflower, 1970	3:24
5.	"San Miguel"	Dennis Wilson, Gregg Jakobson	unreleased track	2:25
6.	"School Day (Ring! Ring! Goes the Bell)"	Berry	Keepin' the Summer Alive, 1980	2:46
7.	"Good Timin'"	B. Wilson, Carl Wilson	L.A. (Light Album), 1979	2:10
8.	"Sail On, Sailor"	B. Wilson, Almer, Van Dyke Parks, Ray Kennedy, Rieley	Holland, 1973	3:17
Total length:				21:37

Side three
No.	Title	Writer(s)	Original release	Length
1.	"Darlin'"	B. Wilson, Love	The Beach Boys in Concert, 1973	2:22
2.	"Lady Lynda"	Jardine, Ron Altbach	L.A. (Light Album), 1979	3:56
3.	"Sea Cruise"	Huey "Piano" Smith	unreleased track recorded during sessions for 15 Big Ones	3:25
4.	"The Trader"	C. Wilson, Rieley	Holland, 1973	5:04
5.	"This Whole World"	B. Wilson	Sunflower, 1970	1:55
6.	"Don't Go Near the Water"	Love, Jardine	Surf's Up, 1971	2:38
7.	"Surf's Up"	B. Wilson, Parks	Surf's Up, 1971	4:10
Total length:				23:30

Side four
No.	Title	Writer(s)	Original release	Length
1.	"Come Go with Me"	Clarence Quick	M.I.U. Album, 1978	2:06
2.	"Deirdre"	Johnston, B. Wilson	Sunflower, 1970	3:26
3.	"She's Got Rhythm"	B. Wilson, Love	M.I.U. Album, 1978	2:26
4.	"River Song"	D. Wilson, C. Wilson	Pacific Ocean Blue, 1977	3:44
5.	"Long Promised Road"	C. Wilson, Rieley	Surf's Up, 1971	3:29
6.	"Feel Flows"	C. Wilson, Rieley	Surf's Up, 1971	4:44
7.	"'Til I Die"	B. Wilson	Surf's Up, 1971	2:39
Total length:				22:34

=== Singles ===
- "Come Go with Me" (from M.I.U. Album) b/w "Don't Go near the Water" (from Surf's Up) (Brother/Caribou), November 2, 1981 US #18

Ten Years of Harmony (Brother/Caribou/CBS Z2X 37445) reached #156 in the US. during a chart stay of six weeks.

== Personnel ==
The Beach Boys

- Brian Wilson – vocals, keyboards, Moog synthesizer, bass guitar, drums
- Mike Love – vocals
- Carl Wilson – vocals, lead guitar, rhythm guitar, keyboards, bass guitar, Moog bass, drums, percussion
- Al Jardine – vocals, rhythm guitar, bass guitar, banjo, lead guitar, Moog synthesizer
- Dennis Wilson – vocals, drums, keyboards
- Bruce Johnston – vocals, keyboards, mandolin
- Blondie Chaplin – vocals, lead guitar, bass guitar
- Ricky Fataar – vocals, drums

Additional musicians and production staff

- James William Guercio – bass guitar and co-producer of "Good Timin'"
- Jack Rieley – backing vocals
- Ed Carter – guitars, bass guitar
- Billy Hinsche – harmony and backing vocals, keyboards, rhythm guitar
- Mike Kowalski – percussion, drums
- Robert Kenyatta – congas
- Carlos Munoz – keyboards
- Marilyn Wilson, Diane Rovell – harmony and backing vocals
- Daryl Dragon – keyboards, vibraphone
- Stephen Desper – vocals, Moog synthesizer
- Sterling Smith – harpsichord
- Woody Thews – percussion

== Sources ==
- "The Nearest Faraway Place: Brian Wilson, The Beach Boys and the Southern California Experience", Timothy White, c. 1994.
- "Wouldn't It Be Nice – My Own Story", Brian Wilson and Todd Gold, c. 1991.
- "Top Pop Singles 1955–2001", Joel Whitburn, c. 2002.
- "Top Pop Albums 1955–2001", Joel Whitburn, c. 2002.
