= Student Demonstration Time =

Single by the Beach Boys

from the album Surf's Up
- B-side: "Don't Go Near the Water"
- Released: August 30, 1971
- Recorded: November 3, 1970 – early 1971
- Genre: Hard rock; blues rock; R&B
- Length: 3:58
- Label: Brother/Reprise
- Songwriters: Jerry Leiber, Mike Stoller, Mike Love
- Producer: The Beach Boys

The Beach Boys singles chronology
"Long Promised Road" / "'Til I Die" (1971)	"Student Demonstration Time" (1971)	"Surf's Up" (1971)

"Student Demonstration Time" is a song by the American rock band the Beach Boys from their 1971 album Surf's Up. It is an altered version of Jerry Leiber and Mike Stoller's "Riot in Cell Block Number 9" with new lyrics by Mike Love.

== Background and lyrics ==
The song that "Student Demonstration Time" is based on—"Riot in Cell Block Number 9"—was originally written by Jerry Leiber and Mike Stoller in 1954, and was considered for inclusion on the Beach Boys' 1965 album Party!, but was ultimately not included. The song was subsequently performed live by the Beach Boys in concert starting in 1969. In mid-1970, Mike Love re-wrote the lyrics after learning of the Kent State Shootings where four unarmed college students protesting the Cambodian Campaign were killed by the Ohio National Guard on Monday, May 4, 1970. Stephen Desper, engineer of the Beach Boys during this period, explained the genesis and context behind the song:

If you lived through the 60s, the civil riots, the unrest, the anti-war demonstrations, the crowds of unruly students in the streets, with hundreds of young soldiers dying every day -- every day, and in-depth TV coverage of people being shot at close range coming into our living rooms every night, you might have more understanding of "the why and wherefore" of the song. Michael was seeing all this going on in Santa Barbara, California, where he lived. It was in his front yard. It was in all our lives. It was a sick time. The country was sick. And much of it was needless. Michael was moved to write a song about war protest. His approach was to offer vocal advice to the listener as to what to do when you may be caught up in one of these civil unrests -- so as not to get killed. Remember, Kent State was still in the news when the lyrics were written.

Other events referred to in the song include (in order of appearance):

- Autumn 1964 – Berkeley Free Speech Movement
- May 1969 – People's Park, also in Berkeley, California
- June 1970 – rioting in Isla Vista, California
- May 14–15, 1970 – Jackson State killings
- May 4, 1970 – Kent State shootings

== Release ==
"Student Demonstration Time" (backed with "Don't Go Near the Water") was released as a single in the Netherlands—where it peaked at #21—and Italy, as well as Australia, where it charted during 1972. However, for the British and German releases of the single, the A-side and B-side were switched, resulting in "Don't Go Near the Water" being the A-side.

== Criticisms ==
According to Jack Rieley, the band's manager at the time, "Student Demonstration Time" "had Carl and I [sic] blushing with embarrassment", while Dennis was "thoroughly disgusted". Brian disliked the song, saying that the lyrical content was "too intense".

The track is widely considered to break up the flow of Surf's Up, as it is at a louder volume, aggressively contrasting the arrangements of adjacent tracks "Disney Girls (1957)" & "Feel Flows".

It placed 7th on the Rolling Stone's list of 50 Terrible Songs on Great Albums.

== Personnel ==
Credits from Craig Slowinski

The Beach Boys

- Al Jardine – backing vocals
- Bruce Johnston – backing vocals
- Mike Love – lead and backing vocals, tambourine
- Carl Wilson – backing vocals, electric guitars
- Dennis Wilson – backing vocals, drums

Additional musicians

- Blondie Chaplin – bass guitar
- Daryl Dragon – tack piano, Moog synthesizer
- Glenn Ferris – trombone
- Sal Marquez – trumpet
- Roger Neumann – tenor saxophone
- Joel Peskin – tenor saxophone
- Mike Price – trumpet

== Charts ==
Chart performance for "Student Demonstration Time"
Chart (1971–1972)	Peak position
Australia (Kent Music Report)	62
Netherlands (Dutch Top 40)	21
Netherlands (Single Top 100)	21

== See also ==
- List of anti-war songs
