= Radiant Radish =

Health food store formerly owned by Brian Wilson

Coordinates: 34.081350°N 118.383248°W

- Industry: Grocery store, health food store
- Founded: 1969 in West Hollywood, U.S.
- Founders: Brian Wilson, Steve Korthoff, Arny Geller.
- Defunct: July 29, 1970
- Fate: Bankruptcy
- Products: Natural organic vegetarian food, supplements, and herbs

The Radiant Radish was a health food store located at the corner of Melrose Avenue and San Vicente Boulevard in West Hollywood, California, from 1969 to 1971. It was managed by Brian Wilson of the Beach Boys, his cousin Steve Korthoff, and friend Arny Geller.

== Background ==
Beach Boys member Brian Wilson opened the small health food store with his cousin, Steve Korthoff, and friend Arnie Geller in mid-1969. It was financed with $15,000 (equivalent to $130,000 in 2025). Prior to this, Wilson had displayed a fervent interest in physical fitness with his band's 1967 song "Vegetables". When he had planned to issue the song as a single, he held a mock photoshoot at the Los Angeles Farmers Market, where he posed in front of a fruit and vegetable stand. The location was at Fairfax Avenue and 3rd Street.

== Operations ==
The Radiant Radish had irregular hours. Wilson would open the store whenever he felt like it, usually at night, and manage the counter while still dressed in his pajamas, bathrobe, and slippers. He would also occasionally indulge himself to up to $1,000 of his own stock (equivalent to $9,000 in 2025). Journalist Tom Nolan recalled encountering Wilson alone at the store and clad in a bathrobe. Wilson refused to sell him a bottle of Vitamin B-12, explaining that Nolan first needed to provide proof of a doctor's prescription.

Nolan wrote about the experience in his 1971 cover story for Rolling Stone, "The Beach Boys: A California Saga". Biographer Peter Ames Carlin later wrote: "Nolan was less surprised by the robe than by the simple fact that the man wearing it was a millionaire rock star whose penchant for seclusion had become nearly as famous as the many hit songs he had written and produced. Just three years after writing and producing 'Good Vibrations', Brian Wilson was selling vitamins out of a health food store in West Hollywood."

== Closure ==
The Radiant Radish was closed by 1970 due to unprofitable produce expenditures and Wilson's lack of business acumen. In 2015, Wilson said his favorite part about running the store was the cash register. He also met journalist and radio presenter Jack Rieley at the store, who would manage the Beach Boys and act as Wilson's principal lyricist for a brief period.

== In popular culture ==
- In 1970, the Beach Boys recorded Wilson's song "H.E.L.P. Is On the Way", which mentions the Radiant Radish in its lyrics. The song was unreleased until the 1993 box set Good Vibrations: Thirty Years of the Beach Boys.
- In 1990, the shop appeared as an illustration on the cover of the tribute album Smiles, Vibes & Harmony: A Tribute to Brian Wilson.

== Sources ==
- Gaines, Steven (1986). Heroes and Villains: The True Story of The Beach Boys (1st ed.). New York: Da Capo Press. ISBN 0306806479.
