= Good Vibrations: Thirty Years of the Beach Boys =

Box set by the Beach Boys
- Released: June 29, 1993
- Recorded: 1960–1988
- Genre: Rock
- Length: 382:27
- Label: Capitol
- Compilers: Mark Linett, David Leaf, Andy Paley

The Beach Boys chronology
Summer in Paradise (1992)	Good Vibrations: Thirty Years of the Beach Boys (1993)	Stars and Stripes Vol. 1 (1996)

Professional ratings
Review scores
Source	Rating
AllMusic	5/5 stars
Blender	5/5 stars
Encyclopedia of Popular Music	5/5 stars
Rolling Stone	5/5 stars
The Rolling Stone Album Guide	4/5 stars

Good Vibrations: Thirty Years of the Beach Boys is a box set by the American rock band the Beach Boys, released in 1993 by Capitol Records. It collects tracks spanning their entire career up to that point on four CDs. A fifth disc contains mostly studio session tracks, complete vocal and instrumental tracks, and rare live performances. The set also includes a car window decal. Though it never charted, Good Vibrations: Thirty Years of the Beach Boys went gold in the US just over four months after its release.

The first four discs anthologize the band with mostly mono single versions of their hits, but also several demos and unreleased songs; the tracks are organized essentially in chronological order. Disc 2 includes 30 minutes of music from the 1966/1967 Smile sessions, which had been heavily bootlegged for years but never officially released. In addition, there is a hidden recording at the end of Disc 1 of a young Brian Wilson singing "Happy Birthday Four Freshmen" to his favorite vocal group into his tape recorder in 1960.

== Track listing ==
All songs by Brian Wilson and Mike Love, except where noted.

Disc one
No.	Title	Writer(s)	Original release	Length
1.	"Surfin' U.S.A." (demo version)	Brian Wilson, Chuck Berry	Previously unreleased	1:49
2.	"Little Surfer Girl"	B. Wilson	Previously unreleased	0:31
3.	"Surfin'" (rehearsal)		Previously unreleased	1:31
4.	"Surfin'" (Featuring Take 1, followed by Take 7 (master))		Surfin' Safari	2:28
5.	"Their Hearts Were Full of Spring" (demo)	Bobby Troup	Previously unreleased	2:35
6.	"Surfin' Safari"		Surfin' Safari	2:16
7.	"409"	B. Wilson, Mike Love, Gary Usher	Surfin' Safari	2:09
8.	"Punchline" (instrumental)	B. Wilson	Previously unreleased	1:52
9.	"Surfin' U.S.A."	B. Wilson, Berry	Surfin' U.S.A.	2:29
10.	"Shut Down"	B. Wilson, Roger Christian	Surfin' U.S.A.	1:51
11.	"Surfer Girl"	B. Wilson	Surfer Girl	2:26
12.	"Little Deuce Coupe"	B. Wilson, Christian	Surfer Girl	1:48
13.	"In My Room"	B. Wilson, Usher	Surfer Girl	2:15
14.	"Catch a Wave"		Surfer Girl	2:18
15.	"The Surfer Moon"	B. Wilson	Surfer Girl	2:18
16.	"Be True to Your School" (single version)		Little Deuce Coupe	2:07
17.	"Spirit of America"	B. Wilson, Christian	Little Deuce Coupe	2:20
18.	"Little Saint Nick" (single version)		The Beach Boys' Christmas Album	1:59
19.	"The Things We Did Last Summer"	J. Styne, S. Cahn	Previously unreleased	2:27
20.	"Fun, Fun, Fun"		Shut Down Volume 2	2:19
21.	"Don't Worry Baby"	B. Wilson, Christian	Shut Down Volume 2	2:49
22.	"Why Do Fools Fall in Love"	Frankie Lymon, Morris Levy	Shut Down Volume 2	2:08
23.	"The Warmth of the Sun"		Shut Down Volume 2	2:50
24.	"I Get Around"		All Summer Long	2:13
25.	"All Summer Long"		All Summer Long	2:07
26.	"Little Honda"		All Summer Long	1:51
27.	"Wendy"		All Summer Long	2:20
28.	"Don't Back Down"		All Summer Long	1:53
29.	"Do You Wanna Dance?"	Bobby Freeman	The Beach Boys Today!	2:17
30.	"When I Grow Up (To Be a Man)"		The Beach Boys Today!	2:01
31.	"Dance, Dance, Dance"	B. Wilson, Carl Wilson, Love	The Beach Boys Today!	1:59
32.	"Please Let Me Wonder"		The Beach Boys Today!	2:45
33.	"She Knows Me Too Well"		The Beach Boys Today!	2:28
34.	"Radio Station Jingles/Concert Promo"		Previously unreleased	1:03
35.	"Hushabye (Live)"	Doc Pomus, Mort Shuman	Previously unreleased	3:56
36.	"Happy Birthday Four Freshmen" (hidden track)

Disc two
No.	Title	Writer(s)	Original release	Length
1.	"California Girls"		Summer Days (And Summer Nights!!)	2:37
2.	"Help Me, Rhonda"		The Beach Boys Today!	2:47
3.	"Then I Kissed Her"	J. Barry, Ellie Greenwich, Phil Spector	Summer Days (And Summer Nights!!)	2:15
4.	"And Your Dream Comes True"		Summer Days (And Summer Nights!!)	1:06
5.	"The Little Girl I Once Knew" (45 RPM)	B. Wilson	Non album single	2:37
6.	"Barbara Ann" (45 RPM)	Fred Fassert	Beach Boys' Party!	2:04
7.	"Ruby Baby" (outtake)	Jerry Leiber, Mike Stoller	Previously unreleased	2:10
8.	"KOMA" (radio promo spot)		Previously unreleased	0:10
9.	"Sloop John B"	Traditional; arranged by B. Wilson	Pet Sounds	2:57
10.	"Wouldn't It Be Nice"	B. Wilson, Tony Asher	Pet Sounds	2:23
11.	"You Still Believe in Me"	B. Wilson, Asher	Pet Sounds	2:30
12.	"God Only Knows"	B. Wilson, Asher	Pet Sounds	2:49
13.	"Hang On to Your Ego" (alternate version)	B. Wilson, Terry Sachen	Previously unreleased	3:13
14.	"I Just Wasn't Made for These Times"	B. Wilson, Asher	Pet Sounds	3:12
15.	"Pet Sounds"	B. Wilson	Pet Sounds	2:22
16.	"Caroline, No"	B. Wilson, Asher	Pet Sounds	2:52
17.	"Good Vibrations" (45 RPM)		Non album single	3:38
18.	"Our Prayer"	B. Wilson	20/20, intended for Smile	1:07
19.	"Heroes and Villains" (alternate version)	B. Wilson, Van Dyke Parks	previously released as a bonus track on the 1990 reissue of Smiley Smile	3:00
20.	"Heroes and Villains" (Sections)	B. Wilson, Parks	Previously unreleased, intended for Smile	6:40
21.	"Wonderful"	B. Wilson, Parks	Previously unreleased, intended for Smile	2:02
22.	"Cabinessence"	B. Wilson, Parks	20/20, intended for Smile	3:33
23.	"Wind Chimes"	B. Wilson, Parks	Previously unreleased, intended for Smile	2:32
24.	"Heroes and Villains (Intro)"	B. Wilson, Parks	Previously unreleased, intended for Smile	0:35
25.	"Do You Like Worms"	B. Wilson, Parks	Previously unreleased, intended for Smile	4:00
26.	"Vegetables"	B. Wilson, Parks	Previously unreleased, intended for Smile	3:29
27.	"I Love to Say Da Da"	B. Wilson	Previously unreleased, intended for Smile	1:34
28.	"Surf's Up"	B. Wilson, Parks	Previously unreleased, intended for Smile	3:38
29.	"With Me Tonight"	B. Wilson	Smiley Smile	2:17

Disc three
No.	Title	Writer(s)	Original release	Length
1.	"Heroes and Villains"	B. Wilson, Parks	Smiley Smile	3:38
2.	"Darlin'"		Wild Honey	2:12
3.	"Wild Honey"		Wild Honey	2:37
4.	"Let the Wind Blow"		Wild Honey	2:21
5.	"Can't Wait Too Long"	B. Wilson	Previously unreleased	3:51
6.	"Cool, Cool Water"	B. Wilson	Previously unreleased	1:12
7.	"Meant for You"		Friends	0:40
8.	"Friends"	B. Wilson, C. Wilson, Dennis Wilson, Al Jardine	Friends	2:31
9.	"Little Bird"	D. Wilson, Stephen Kalinich	Friends	1:58
10.	"Busy Doin' Nothin'"	B. Wilson	Friends	3:04
11.	"Do It Again"		20/20	2:28
12.	"I Can Hear Music"	J. Barry, Ellie Greenwich, Phil Spector	20/20	2:38
13.	"I Went to Sleep"	B. Wilson, Carl Wilson	20/20	1:38
14.	"Time to Get Alone"	B. Wilson	20/20	2:43
15.	"Break Away"	B. Wilson, Reggie Dunbar	Non album single	2:56
16.	"Cotton Fields (The Cotton Song)" (45 version)	Huddie Ledbetter	20/20	3:03
17.	"San Miguel"	D. Wilson, Gregg Jakobson	Ten Years of Harmony	2:26
18.	"Games Two Can Play"	B. Wilson	Previously unreleased, intended for Adult/Child	2:01
19.	"I Just Got My Pay"	B. Wilson	Previously unreleased	2:20
20.	"This Whole World"	B. Wilson	Sunflower	1:57
21.	"Add Some Music to Your Day"	B. Wilson, Love, Joe Knott	Sunflower	3:33
22.	"Forever"	D. Wilson, Jakobson	Sunflower	2:41
23.	"Our Sweet Love"	B. Wilson, C. Wilson, Jardine	Sunflower	2:38
24.	"H.E.L.P. Is On the Way"	B. Wilson	Previously unreleased, intended for Adult/Child	2:30
25.	"4th of July"	D. Wilson, Jack Rieley	Previously unreleased	2:44
26.	"Long Promised Road"	C. Wilson, Rieley	Surf's Up	3:27
27.	"Disney Girls (1957)"	Bruce Johnston	Surf's Up	4:08
28.	"Surf's Up"	B. Wilson, Parks	Surf's Up	4:13
29.	"Til I Die"	B. Wilson	Surf's Up	2:30

Disc four
No.	Title	Writer(s)	Original release	Length
1.	"Sail On, Sailor"	B. Wilson, Parks, Tandyn Almer, Ray Kennedy, Rieley	Holland	3:19
2.	"California"	Jardine	Holland	3:20
3.	"The Trader"	C. Wilson, Rieley	Holland	5:04
4.	"Funky Pretty"	B. Wilson, Love, Rieley	Holland	4:10
5.	"Fairy Tale Music"	B. Wilson	Previously unreleased	4:05
6.	"You Need a Mess of Help to Stand Alone"	B. Wilson, Rieley	Carl and the Passions – "So Tough"	3:26
7.	"Marcella"	B. Wilson, Rieley	Carl and the Passions – "So Tough"	3:52
8.	"All This Is That"	C. Wilson, Love, Jardine	Carl and the Passions – "So Tough"	3:59
9.	"Rock and Roll Music"	Berry	15 Big Ones	2:28
10.	"It's O.K."		15 Big Ones	2:11
11.	"Had to Phone Ya"	B. Wilson, Love, Diane Rovell	15 Big Ones	1:44
12.	"That Same Song"		15 Big Ones	2:15
13.	"It's Over Now"	B. Wilson	Previously unreleased, intended for Adult/Child	2:50
14.	"Still I Dream of It"	B. Wilson	Previously unreleased, intended for Adult/Child	3:26
15.	"Let Us Go On This Way"		The Beach Boys Love You	1:59
16.	"The Night Was So Young"	B. Wilson	The Beach Boys Love You	2:15
17.	"I'll Bet He's Nice"	B. Wilson	The Beach Boys Love You	2:35
18.	"Airplane"	B. Wilson	The Beach Boys Love You	3:04
19.	"Come Go with Me"	C.E. Quick	M.I.U. Album	2:03
20.	"Our Team"	B. Wilson, D. Wilson, C. Wilson, Love, Jardine	Previously unreleased	2:33
21.	"Baby Blue"	D. Wilson, Jakobson, Karen Lamm	L.A. (Light Album)	3:18
22.	"Good Timin'"	B. Wilson, C. Wilson	L.A. (Light Album)	2:11
23.	"Goin' On"		Keepin' the Summer Alive	3:03
24.	"Getcha Back"	Love, Terry Melcher	The Beach Boys	3:02
25.	"Kokomo"	Love, Scott McKenzie, John Phillips, Terry Melcher	Still Cruisin'	3:37

Disc five: Sessions (all tracks previously unreleased)
No.	Title	Writer(s)	Length
1.	"In My Room" (demo, 1963)	B. Wilson, Usher	2:33
2.	"Radio Spot #1"		0:09
3.	"I Get Around" (track only, 1964)		2:19
4.	"Radio Spot #2"		0:15
5.	"Dance, Dance, Dance" (tracking session, 1964)	B. Wilson, C. Wilson, Love	2:12
6.	"Hang On to Your Ego" (sessions)	B. Wilson, Asher	6:40
7.	"God Only Knows" (tracking session)	B. Wilson, Asher	9:14
8.	"Good Vibrations" (sessions)		15:18
9.	"Heroes and Villains" (track only)	B. Wilson, Parks	0:47
10.	"Cabinessence" (track only)	B. Wilson, Parks	3:59
11.	"Surf's Up" (track only)	B. Wilson, Parks	1:40
12.	"Radio Spot #3"		0:06
13.	"All Summer Long" (vocals)		2:12
14.	"Wendy" (vocals)		2:27
15.	"Hushabye" (vocals)	Doc Pomus, Mort Shuman	2:42
16.	"When I Grow Up" (vocals)		2:19
17.	"Wouldn't It Be Nice" (vocals)	B. Wilson, Asher	2:43
18.	"California Girls" (vocals only)		2:34
19.	"Radio Spot #4"		0:11
20.	"Concert Intro/Surfin' USA" (live 1964)		3:15
21.	"Surfer Girl" (live 1964)	B. Wilson	2:52
22.	"Be True to Your School" (live 1964)		2:29
23.	"Good Vibrations" (live 1966)		5:14
24.	"Surfer Girl" (live in Hawaii rehearsals 1967)	B. Wilson	2:18

Special Bonus CD (European edition only)
No.	Title	Writer(s)	Original release	Length
1.	"Bluebirds Over the Mountain"	Ersel Hickey	20/20	2:53
2.	"Tears in the Morning"	Bruce Johnston	Sunflower	4:09
3.	"Here Comes the Night" (12" version)		L.A. (Light Album)	10:45
4.	"Lady Lynda"	Johann Sebastian Bach, Jardine, Ron Altbach	L.A. (Light Album)	4:00
5.	"Sumahama"	Love	L.A. (Light Album)	4:09
