= A Day in the Life of a Tree =

Song written by Brian Wilson and Jack Rieley for US band The Beach Boys

Song by the Beach Boys

from the album Surf's Up
- Released: August 30, 1971
- Recorded: April – July 1971
- Studio: Beach Boys, Los Angeles
- Genre: Tone poem
- Length: 3:07
- Label: Brother/Reprise
- Songwriters: Brian Wilson; Jack Rieley
- Producer: The Beach Boys

Licensed audio
- "A Day in the Life of a Tree" on YouTube

Audio sample
- file; help

"A Day in the Life of a Tree" is a song by American rock band the Beach Boys from their 1971 album Surf's Up. It was written by Brian Wilson and the group's manager Jack Rieley, who also performed lead vocal. The lyrics were inspired by Wilson's feelings toward environmental pollution.

== Background and inspiration ==
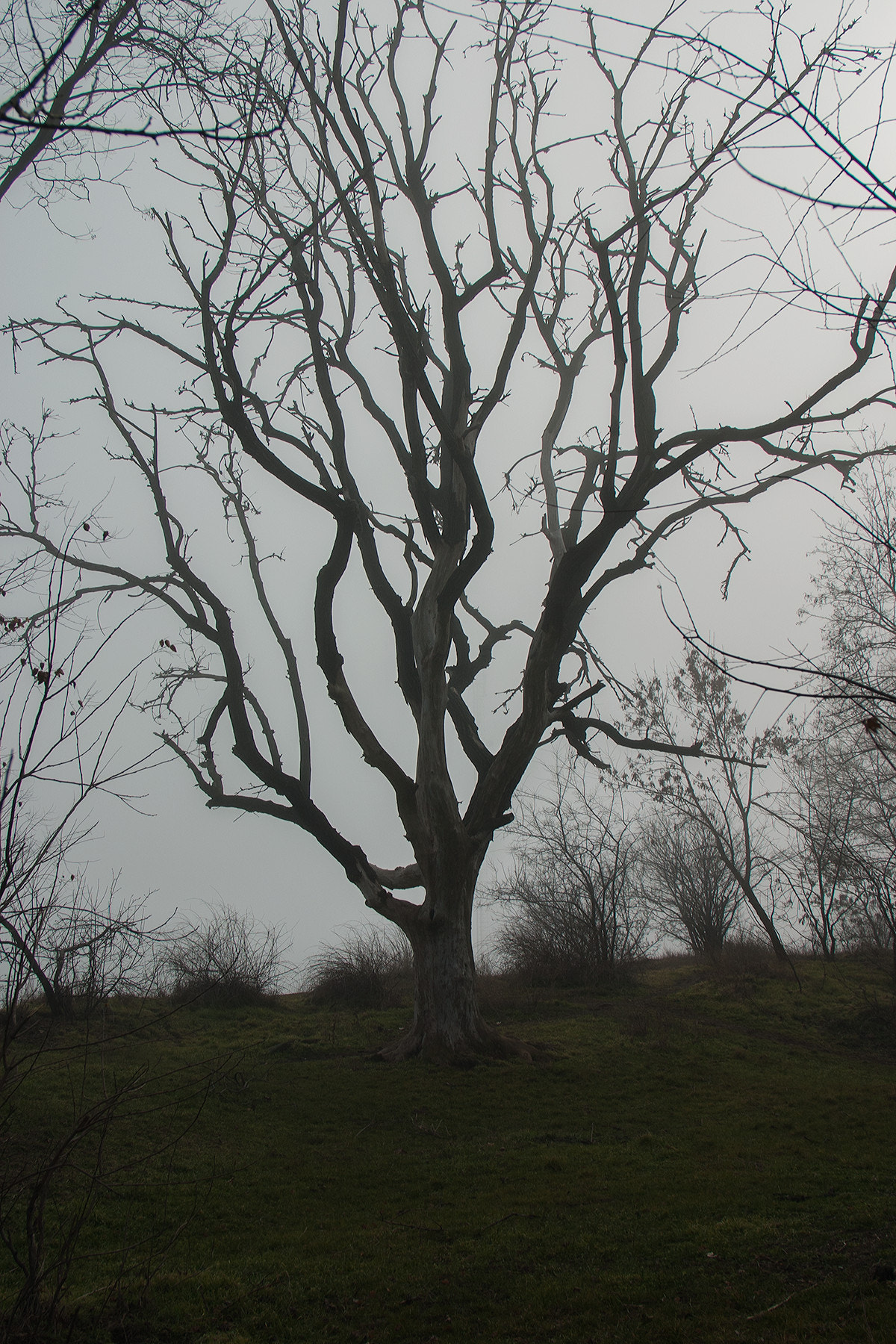
"A Day in the Life of a Tree" was written from the perspective of a dying tree.

Wilson's 2016 memoir, I Am Brian Wilson, states of "A Day in the Life of a Tree"

[It was] about the environment ... a tree thinking out loud (or thinking silently but singing out loud) about all the bad things that were happening to it. In the back of my mind, I might have been thinking of the tree in Rosemary Clooney's "Tenderly." Jack Rieley and I talked about the idea of the song and then he wrote lyrics. ... [It's] a big song because it's about how people treat the earth, but it's also a small song because it's about how one living thing can feel stripped down and wrong for the world. In a way it's not so different from "I Just Wasn't Made for These Times."

According to Rieley,

Brian Wilson and I had been talking a lot about the sorry state of the planet back then. He was filled with questions and we went on for hours about it. Forests were dying, the air had turned brown, the earth's future was beginning to appear hazardous to health. When Brian first played the chords and sang the tentative melody for me, he asked what the song should be about and I suggested a single tree as metaphor for the earth; that single tree as metaphor for more than ecology. I fell in love with the chords at once and loved the swelling tension of that droned bass line; the song seemed to lend itself to the lyrical concept. He went nuts for the lyrics when I showed them to him. Loved 'em, memorized the first verse and was singing around the house. Carl and I were positive that Brian had to sing A Day in the Life of a Tree.

AllMusic interpreted the song's subject to be autobiographical, calling it "one of Brian's most deeply touching and bizarre compositions...lamenting his long life amid the pollution and grime of a city park while the somber tones of a pipe organ build atmosphere." In his book The Beach Boys and the California Myth, David Leaf quoted an anonymous friend of Brian's saying that Brian was "choked up" after hearing Rieley's vocal performance of the song, because "he [Brian] really related to the song. It was about him."

== Recording ==
The instrumental track was made in a few days. According to engineer Stephen Desper, the bird sounds were captured from Wilson's backyard at dawn. In 2015, Desper wrote of the song,

I recall the day Brian came to me to discuss a song he was working on (with Jack) about the health and welfare of trees. We went for a walk in Brian's back yard, he was reflecting on some of the trees growing there...some young, some old....strong oaks and one that was dead from a lightning strike. We were discussing how to get the message of the song to come across in a sound picture (or tone poem) and not just a melody with a story attached. Brian would tell me sonic concepts and I'd throw ideas back at him about how to realize the picture from a sound engineering point of view. What is the sound a healthy tree makes? Or a sick and dying tree. How do you tell the story in sonic concept? It wasn’t until I suggested using a pipe organ to represent the majesty of a tree (wood pipes) and a reed organ made of oak, for other sounds that things took off.

Desper recalled that Dennis Wilson was the first to try out the lead vocal. Rieley said that Brian had first attempted singing the lead vocal, but appeared dissatisfied with his performance, and so he enlisted Rieley to "help" by singing an ostensible guide vocal. Rieley performed about 5 takes, after which Wilson declared that Rieley had just done the final lead vocal. Carl said that everybody involved had agreed Rieley was fit to sing the lead vocal, and had worked out a plan to trick him into singing it. In a 2010 interview, Andrew VanWyngarden stated that Al Jardine had told him that "no one would sing [the song] because it was too depressing, so the manager guy, Jack Rieley, sang it."

Warner Bros. Records staff arranger Van Dyke Parks sang background vocals on the track. He elaborated to Rolling Stone in 1971:

I went up there to congratulate them on acting like grown-ups. On continuing to push. Then they had me doing a vocal. I liked that song about the tree just fine. I was just called in to do some singing on one line. It worked out well. Of course I had to stumble out of the studio in pitch darkness. Brian turned out all the lights. Had to crawl out of there on the floor, clutching my wife. Most humiliating thing I've ever ... Oh it's a power trip all right. But I can get behind that. I can get behind the way Brian does it. It's funny to watch him when he can't find something he owns. It's cute when he ignores someone else's needs, because he can always plead insanity.

== Live performance ==
It was performed live only once by the Beach Boys, at the Long Beach Arena in Long Beach, CA on December 3, 1971. The bandmembers reportedly coaxed Brian out from the side of the stage to play organ while Rieley sang it. Rieley commented in a 2013 interview,

The Beach Boys played a big auditorium in Long Beach and I wanted Brian to be there. I went to his house on Bellagio Drive and told Brian, “There’s no talking about it, you’re coming with me!” And he turned it into a fun thing. We rode down to Long Beach and got to the auditorium. Brian was ready to ascend the steps to the stage. Carl said to the audience, “My brother Brian is here,” and the place went bananas; it was so cool! Then Carl said, “Come on Brian, come up on to the stage and sing a song or two.” Brian got onstage and – he’s such a trickster – said, “Thank you very much. Now I want to introduce my good friend Jack Rieley to sing A Day In The Life Of A Tree.” I had no knowledge he was planning to do this and didn’t know many of the lyrics! I’m told there’s a recording on YouTube and you can tell that after a point I wasn’t sure what to sing!

== Recognition ==
Neil Young has briefly referred to "A Day in the Life of a Tree", saying "Brian's a genius...[It's a] great song, man." Music journalist Ian MacDonald referred to the song as "so radically at odds with pop's now ubiquitous irony that you either laugh or become humbled by its pained candour."

== Personnel ==
Credits from Craig Slowinski

The Beach Boys

- Al Jardine - lead (coda) and backing vocals
- Bruce Johnston - backing vocals
- Mike Love - backing vocals
- Brian Wilson - backing vocals, harmonium, Moog synthesizer, temple blocks
- Carl Wilson - backing vocals, acoustic guitars

Additional musicians

- Daryl Dragon - pipe organs
- Stephen W. Desper - bird sfx, Moog programming
- Van Dyke Parks - lead vocals (coda)
- Jack Rieley - lead vocals

== Cover versions ==
- 1996 – Matthew Sweet, Honor: A Benefit for the Honor the Earth Campaign
- 2006 – Suzzy & Maggie Roche, Why The Long Face?
- 2013 – Yo La Tengo, Fade (Deluxe Edition)
- 2024 – Alexis Taylor with Rachel Kitchlew & Alice Boyd (for the UN Live "Sounds Right" initiative)
