= H.E.L.P. Is On the Way =

Song by the Beach Boys

from the album Good Vibrations: Thirty Years of the Beach Boys
- Released: July 29, 1993
- Recorded: August 17, 1970
- Studio: Beach Boys, Bel Air
- Genre: Pop
- Length: 2:30
- Label: Capitol
- Songwriters: Brian Wilson; Mike Love

Licensed audio
- "H.E.L.P. Is On the Way" on YouTube

"H.E.L.P. Is On the Way" is a song by American rock band the Beach Boys that was recorded during the making of their 1971 album Surf's Up. It was written by Brian Wilson and Mike Love about H.E.L.P., a Los Angeles restaurant that the band had frequented. The song also references Wilson's health food shop, the Radiant Radish.

== Recording and release ==
"H.E.L.P. Is On the Way" was recorded at the Beach Boys' private studio on August 17, 1970 and was briefly projected for release on the album that became Surf's Up (1971). It was later considered for inclusion on the 1977 album Adult/Child, which was kept unreleased. The track was ultimately released on the 1993 box set Good Vibrations: Thirty Years of the Beach Boys.

An alternate version with rewritten lyrics, titled "Santa's On His Way", was recorded for the band's aborted 1977 album, Merry Christmas from the Beach Boys. This version, along with the album, remains unreleased.

== Critical reception ==
In his review of Good Vibrations, J. S. Considine of The Baltimore Sun wrote that the lyrical content of "H.E.L.P. Is On the Way" too closely reflected Wilson's decline in the early 1970s. "Who could possibly hear the previously unreleased 'H.E.L.P. Is on the Way' and not wince at the way he describes his self-image and eating problems?" Ethnomusicologist David Toop wrote in 1982 that it may be "the only pop song in history to mention enemas".

== Personnel ==
Credits from Craig Slowinski.

The Beach Boys

- Al Jardine – backing vocals, banjo
- Mike Love – lead and backing vocals
- Brian Wilson – backing vocals, Hammond organ, bass guitar, bass drum, tambourine, handclaps
- Carl Wilson – backing vocals, electric guitar

Additional musician

- Daryl Dragon – tack piano

== See also ==
- List of unreleased songs recorded by the Beach Boys
