= Surf's Up (album) =

Studio album by the Beach Boys
- Released: August 30, 1971
- Recorded: November 1966 – July 1971
- Studios: Beach Boys (Los Angeles); Sunset Sound; Western; Columbia (Hollywood)
- Genres: Progressive pop; psychedelic pop
- Length: 33:49
- Labels: Brother; Reprise; Warner Bros.
- Producer: The Beach Boys

The Beach Boys chronology
Sunflower (1970)	Surf's Up (1971)	Carl and the Passions – "So Tough" (1972)

Singles from Surf's Up
- 1. "Long Promised Road" Released: May 24, 1971; 2. "Long Promised Road" / "'Til I Die" Released: October 11, 1971; 3. "Surf's Up" Released: November 29, 1971

Surf's Up is the seventeenth studio album by the American rock band the Beach Boys, released on August 30, 1971, on Brother/Reprise/Warner Bros. It received largely favorable reviews and reached number 29 on the U.S. record charts, becoming their highest-charting LP of new music in the country since 1967. In the UK, Surf's Up peaked at number 15, continuing a string of top-40 records that began in 1965.

The album's title and cover artwork (a painting based on the early 20th-century sculpture "End of the Trail") are a tongue-in-cheek, self-aware nod to the band's early surfing image. Originally titled Landlocked, the album took its name from the closing track "Surf's Up", originally intended for the unfinished album Smile. Most of Surf's Up was recorded from January to July 1971. In contrast to the previous LP Sunflower, Brian Wilson was not especially active in the production, which resulted in thinner vocal arrangements.

Lyrically, Surf's Up addresses environmental, social, and health concerns more than the group's previous releases. This was at the behest of newly recruited co-manager Jack Rieley, who strove to revamp the group's image and restore their public reputation following the negative reception to their recent albums and tours. His initiatives included a promotional campaign with the tagline "it's now safe to listen to the Beach Boys" and the appointment of Carl Wilson as the band's official leader. The record also included Carl's first major song contributions, "Long Promised Road" and "Feel Flows".

Two singles were issued in the U.S.: "Long Promised Road" and "Surf's Up". Only the former charted, when it was reissued with the B-side "'Til I Die" later in the year, peaking at number 89. In 1993, Surf's Up was ranked number 46 in NME's list of the "Top 100 Albums" in history. In 2000, it ranked number 230 in Colin Larkin's All Time Top 1000 Albums. Session highlights, outtakes, and alternate mixes from the album were collected for the 2021 compilation Feel Flows.

== Background ==
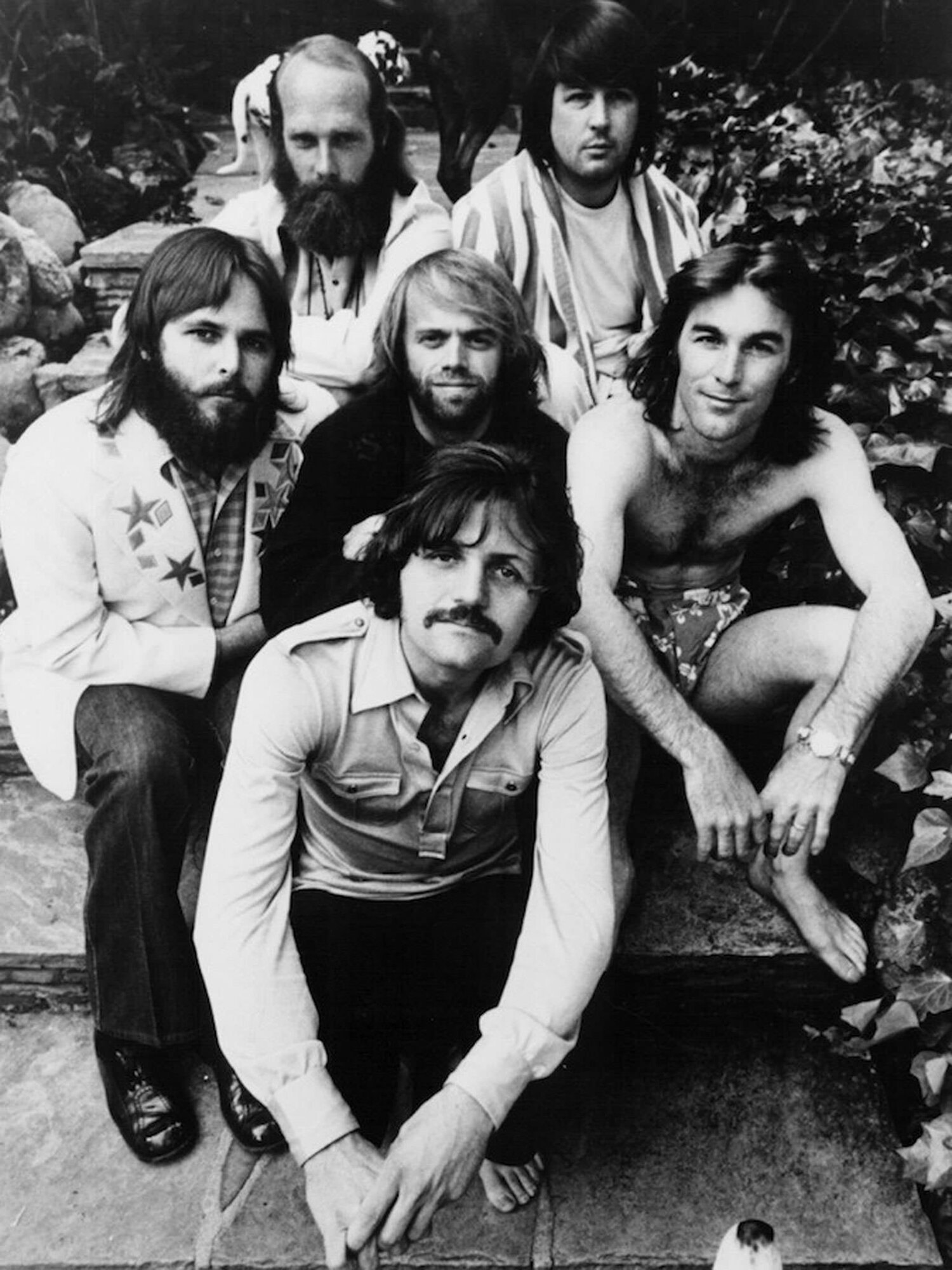
The Beach Boys in 1971. Left to right, starting from back row: Mike Love, Brian Wilson, Carl Wilson, Al Jardine, Dennis Wilson, Bruce Johnston.

On the evening of July 29, 1970, Brian Wilson, accompanied by bandmates Mike Love and Bruce Johnston, granted his first-ever full-length radio interview to KPFK DJ John Frank, also known as Jack Rieley. In the interview, Wilson stated that although he was "proud of the group and the name", he felt that "the clean American thing has hurt us. And we're really not getting any kind of airplay today." Among other topics, Wilson stated that the group was not "putting enough spunk in our production and I don't know who to blame. ... Another thing is that we haven't done enough to change our image, though. ... we sort of operate a democracy thing in our productions. Maybe that's the problem. I don't know." The subject eventually turned to "Surf's Up", an unreleased song from the band's unfinished album Smile. Wilson said he did not want to release the song because it was "too long".

On August 8, Rieley sent the band a six-page memo with advice on how to stimulate "increased record sales and popularity" for the Beach Boys. At the end of August, the group's latest record Sunflower was released as their first album on Reprise Records. It became the worst-selling album in the group's history. Band promoter and co-manager Fred Vail remembered one meeting with the band in which "we were talking about ... Sunflower not charting, and they were wondering why. I said to them, 'Listen, this is a phase right now. If you stay the course, your real audience won't forget you. They won't desert you.' But the Beach Boys really didn't believe in themselves." Vail was soon replaced by Rieley, primarily at the instigation of Love and Johnston. (Note: Nick Grillo remained the band's business manager until December 1971.)

It sounds silly, but people in America at this time were afraid to listen to the Beach Boys. 20/20 and Sunflower were real disasters sales-wise. But Sunflower was one of the finest recordings I have ever heard by anybody. So, I changed the group.

— Band manager Jack Rieley, 1974

Some of Rieley's earliest initiatives were to end the group's longstanding practice of wearing matching stage uniforms and to appoint Carl Wilson as the band's official leader. The group spent the majority of September and October rehearsing for upcoming concerts. On October 3, at the invitation of Van Dyke Parks, the band performed two sets at the eighth annual Big Sur Folk Festival in California to an audience of 6,000. According to music historian Keith Badman, the performances "help[ed] to establish the group's image in the eyes of the rock hierarchy, and they were subsequently 'rediscovered' as an important live act." (Note: From August 13 to late October, Dennis shot his parts for the Universal Pictures road movie Two-Lane Blacktop. Due to these commitments, he did not attend the rehearsals or the concerts, and was replaced by Mike Kowalski.) Biographer David Leaf wrote that the concert inspired an apologetic review from Rolling Stone co-founder Jann Wenner, who had previously criticized the band for pulling out of the 1967 Monterey International Pop Festival. A rumor circulated among news outlets that Brian Wilson was writing music with Parks for an upcoming Beach Boys television special, H-2-0.

In early November, Brian temporarily rejoined the touring band to play four dates at the Whisky a Go Go in West Hollywood. The group had not played a concert in Los Angeles since 1966, and Brian had not performed with the touring group since early 1970, when he briefly filled in for Love. (Note: Brian only played the first two nights, as he experienced a panic attack on the second.). Guitarist Ed Carter and keyboardist Daryl Dragon accompanied the band on this tour, along with supporting act the Flame. (Note: Rieley later told a radio interview, "From an artistic stance, it was a disastrous tour" due to the Beach Boys' dissatisfactory performances.) Reports from this period suggested that the group was planning to move from Los Angeles to Britain once their recording commitments were finished. (Note: In one report, Rieley said they were "definitely leaving Los Angeles because of the smog.") From January to early April 1971, they worked intermittently on their second album for Reprise.

== Production and style ==
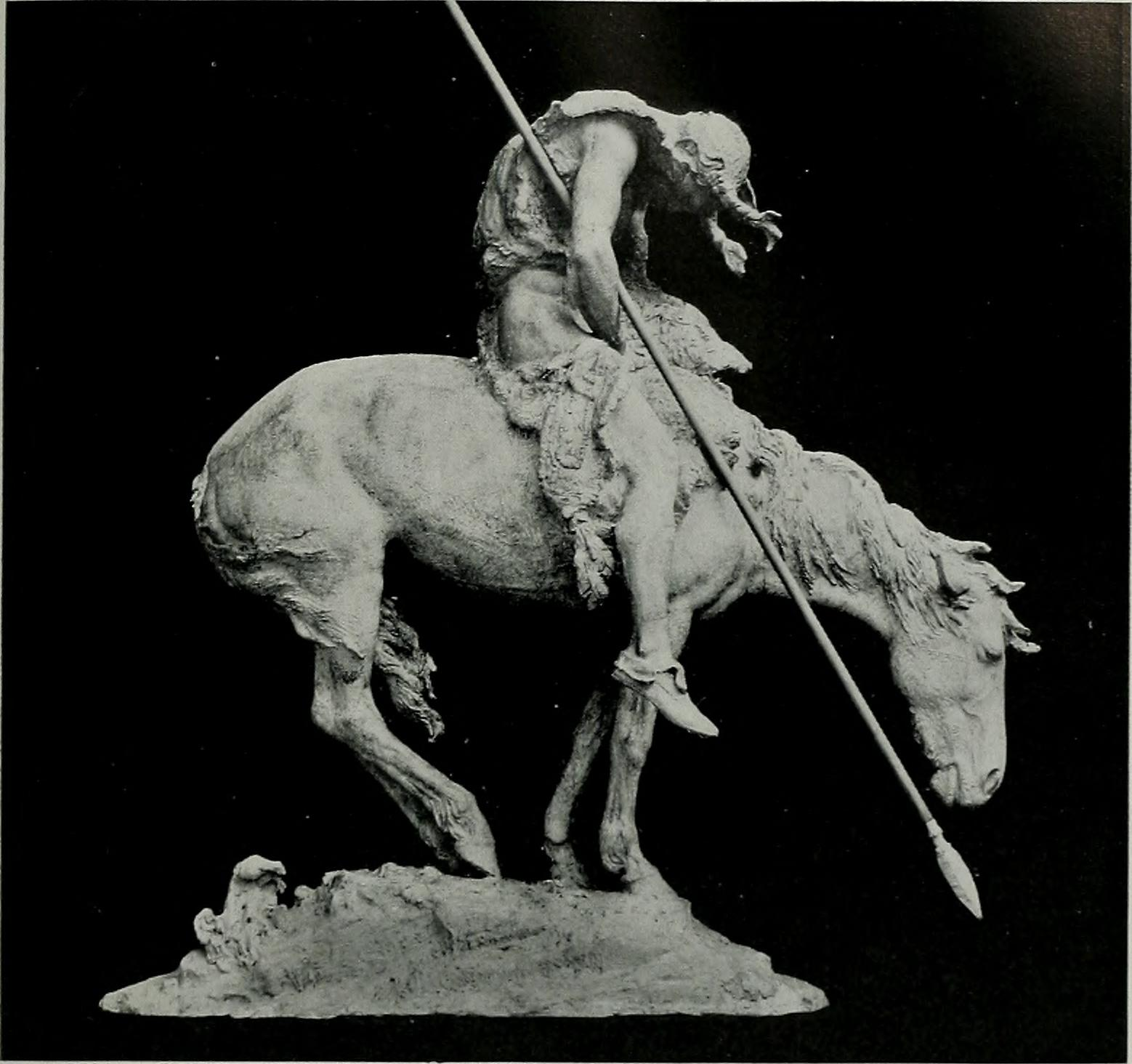
The artwork of Surf's Up is based on the sculpture "End of the Trail" by James Earle Fraser.

Surf's Up was recorded between January and July 1971, excluding a few tracks. (Note: "Surf's Up" (portions recorded in 1966), "Take a Load Off Your Feet" (portions recorded in January 1970), "'Til I Die" (portions recorded in August 1970), and "Student Demonstration Time" (portions recorded in November 1970).) After the release of Sunflower, band engineer Stephen Desper assembled a collection of songs consisting mostly of outtakes deemed suitable for a follow-up LP, which he labelled "Second Brother Album". (Note: These songs were "Loop de Loop", "Susie Cincinnati", "San Miguel", "H.E.L.P. Is On the Way", "Take a Load Off Your Feet", "Carnival", "I Just Got My Pay", "Good Time", "Big Sur", "Lady", "When Girls Get Together", "Lookin' at Tomorrow", and "'Til I Die".) Rieley later called these selections "forgettable" and said that he was "totally perplexed ... I met with [Warner executive] Mo Ostin, a true Brian Wilson fan, at Warner Bros., who listened to the songs, and he declared: 'No way.'"

Rieley encouraged the band to write songs with more socially conscious and topical lyrics, although he stated in a 2013 interview that they "never had any 'What are we gonna write about?' meeting. Never once did anything like that ever occur." He assigned the project the working title of Landlocked to represent "a demarcation line, separating striped-shirted bullshit that had become irrelevant, an object of public scorn, from artistry, creativity and great new songs." An album cover was designed with this title, featuring white sans-serif letters printed atop a photograph of a dark field. (Note: It was long thought that Landlocked was a complete album that was scrapped by the Beach Boys in between Sunflower and Surf's Up, but this was not true. Writing in The Beach Boys: The Definitive Diary, Keith Badman states that Landlocked was nothing more than a provisional title for Surf's Up, and in a February 1970 interview, the group referred to the Second Brother Album acetate as tracks that "might be on an album, but it's not a new album".)

The Landlocked cover was ultimately discarded in favor of a different design. Rieley said that the final cover "was something that caught my eye at an antique record shop near Silver Lake. It was a painting and I bought it. It reminded me a bit of the Brother Records logo, but it was different." Conversely, Desper recalled that a print of a painting of End of the Trail, "use[d] to hang in Murry Wilson's office behind his desk, as Brian recalls from his childhood. Brian always like[d] the painting as it was part of Denny's, Carl's and his youth." Surf's Up was the first album for which the group printed the lyrics of each song on the record sleeve.

In 1974, Rieley stated that his growing involvement with the songwriting process attracted the ire of Love, Johnston, and Al Jardine, who "tried to force me to march into Mo Ostin's and sell him on their 1969 track 'Loop De Loop'. I refused and Brian, Dennis, and Carl backed me up." Due to Brian's reduced involvement, the vocal arrangements were not as dense as those for Sunflower. Johnston recalled, "It was strange to be doing vocal arrangements to make it sound like the Beach Boys when we were the Beach Boys. That's a little weird to me."

== Songs ==
"Feel Flows"
"Feel Flows" was written by Carl Wilson with Jack Rieley. Carl's lead vocals were mixed with backwards reverb.

"Long Promised Road" and "Feel Flows" were Carl Wilson's first significant solo compositions and were recorded almost entirely by himself. "Student Demonstration Time" (a topical reworking of Jerry Leiber and Mike Stoller's "Riot in Cell Block Number 9") and the environmentalist anthem "Don't Go Near the Water" found Love and Jardine embracing the group's new socially conscious direction.

"'Til I Die" was a song Brian Wilson had been working on since mid-1970. It was written while he was suffering from an existential crisis, and he took weeks to refine the arrangement, using a drum machine and crafting a harmony-driven, vibraphone and organ-laden background. "A Day in the Life of a Tree", written by Brian and Rieley, is about a tree succumbing to the effects of environmental pollution; the accompaniment includes an antique pump organ and a smaller pipe organ.

Johnston said that he wrote "Disney Girls (1957)" "because I saw so many kids in our audiences being wiped out on drugs," and wanted to capture the feeling of an era in which people were "a little naive but a little healthier." Jardine contributed "Take a Load Off Your Feet", a Sunflower outtake, and "Lookin' at Tomorrow (A Welfare Song)", both co-written with longtime friend Gary Winfrey. Biographer Timothy White wrote that the latter song was "a poignant mini-soliloquy from a jobless rounder, seems like a coda to 'Long Promised Road,' the pioneer busted in his starry-eyed ambitions but still 'looking at tomorrow' for fresh potential." Jardine said that it was "actually an old folk song" to which he "rewrote the lyrics to reflect the times".

Rieley had asked Brian about including "Surf's Up" on Landlocked, and in early June, Brian suddenly allowed Carl and Rieley to finish the song. Carl overdubbed a new vocal track in the song's first part, the original backing track dating from November 1966. The second movement consisted of a December 1966 solo piano demo recorded by Brian, augmented with vocal and Moog synthesizer overdubs. Johnston recalled, "We ended up doing vocals to sort of emulate ourselves without Brian Wilson, which was kind of silly." With the song completed, Landlocked was given the new title of Surf's Up.

== Leftover material ==
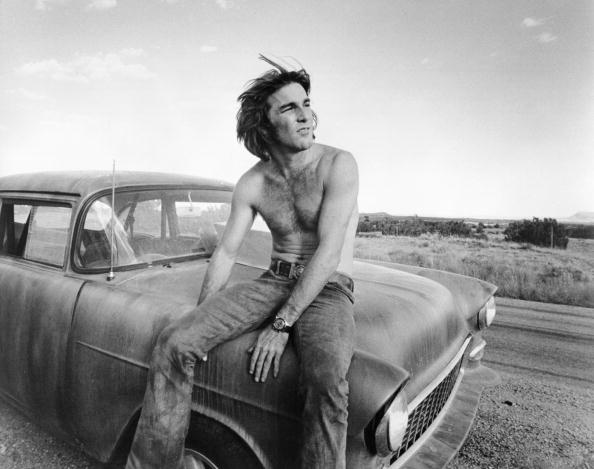
Dennis Wilson while filming Two-Lane Blacktop in 1970. His songs were left off Surf's Up to preserve harmony within the group.

The Dennis Wilson compositions "4th of July" and "(Wouldn't It Be Nice to) Live Again" were recorded in early 1971 but left off the record. In a September 1971 interview, Dennis stated, "I have a belief in my music. And it sounds nothing like it should on the album – it should have a flow from one song to another ... It didn't sound like The Beach Boys. They thought it did. I said ‘Bullshit’ and pulled my songs off." According to Rieley, the absence of any these songs on Surf's Up was for two reasons: to quell political infighting within the group concerning the album's share of Wilson-brother songs, and because Dennis wanted to save material for a solo album, projected for release in 1971. (Note: In December 1970, Dennis released the single "Sound of Free" (credited to "Dennis Wilson & Rumbo"), but the album project was ultimately shelved.)

In 1993, "4th of July" was included on the box set Good Vibrations: Thirty Years of The Beach Boys. "(Wouldn't It Be Nice to) Live Again" was written with Stanley Shapiro. According to Beach Boys biographer Jon Stebbins, Dennis had wanted the song to close the record, following "'Til I Die", but Carl objected. In 2013, it was released on the box set Made in California, along with a 1974 recording of "Barnyard Blues", a song that Dennis had composed during the Surf's Up sessions. Dennis also recorded "Barbara", a piano demo named after his then-girlfriend, and a track called "Old Movie". "Barbara" was released in 1998 for the Endless Harmony Soundtrack, while "Old Movie" would be released on the 2021 box set Feel Flows.

Other outtakes include Brian's "My Solution" and "H.E.L.P. Is On the Way". "H.E.L.P. Is On the Way" would later be reused for the unreleased 1977 album Adult/Child and saw release on the 1993 box set Good Vibrations: Thirty Years of The Beach Boys. According to singer Terry Jacks, the group asked him to be their producer for a session. On July 31, 1970, they attempted a rendition of the Jacques Brel/Rod McKuen song "Seasons in the Sun", but the session went badly, and the track was never finished. Jacks later had a hit with his own version of the song in 1974. Afterward, Mike Love told an interviewer: "We did record a version [of 'Seasons'] but it was so wimpy we had to throw it out. ... It was just the wrong song for us. I'm glad Terry had a hit with it." Love's "Big Sur", recorded in August 1970, was later remade in a different time signature for the 1973 album Holland. In March 1971, Carl recorded a Moog synthesizer sound collage titled "Telephone Backgrounds (On a Clear Day)". "My Solution", "Seasons in the Sun", and the original version of "Big Sur" were released on the 2021 box set Feel Flows.

== Release ==
Rieley arranged for the group to appear in a series of commercials with the tagline "It's now safe to listen to the Beach Boys." He also arranged a guest appearance at a Grateful Dead concert at promoter Bill Graham's Fillmore East in Manhattan in April 1971 to foreground the band's transition into the counterculture. For their performances this year, the Beach Boys enlisted a full horn section and additional percussionists. A journalist who attended the show later reported that Bob Dylan, who was watching from the sound booth, remarked: "You know, they're pretty fucking good." (Note: Biographer Steven Gaines wrote that the bootlegged tape of this concert "became legendary in the rock-and-roll business.") Contrary to what would later be written of the show, the Grateful Dead's audience disliked the Beach Boys' appearance. On May 1, the band performed at The Peace Treaty Celebration Rock Show, an anti-war rally concert at Syracuse University organized by the Mayday Collective, with approximately 500,000 people in attendance. Footage of the band performing "Student Demonstration Time" later appeared in the 1985 documentary An American Band. (Note: The Beach Boys were the only major group to appear at the rally. David Leaf wrote: "People were shaking their heads in disdain when it was announced that the Beach Boys were going to play ... All of a sudden", following the concert, "the Beach Boys were relevant." According to Keith Badman, the group's status "as a notable live act" was restored with this concert, and it was held just two days after performing to one of their smallest ever crowds, in Maryland, for an audience of 200.)

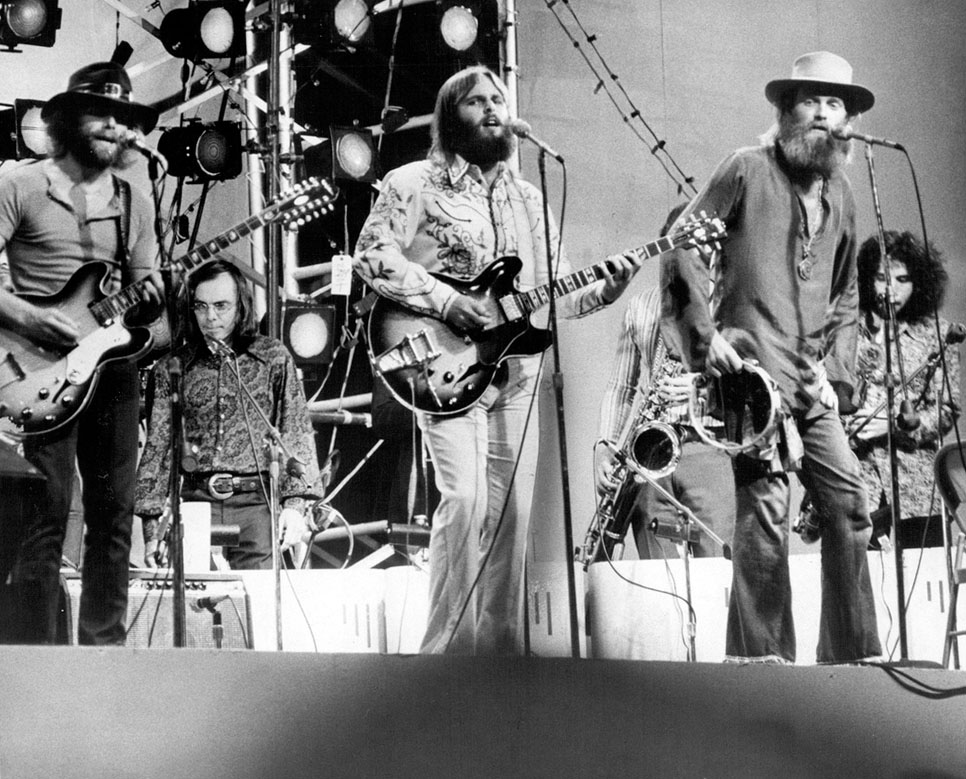
The Beach Boys performing at Central Park in July 1971. The concert was broadcast as part of an ABC-TV special on August 19.

On May 24, "Long Promised Road"/"Deirdre" was issued as the lead single from Surf's Up, becoming their sixth consecutive U.S. single that failed to chart. In July, the American music press rated the Beach Boys "the hottest grossing act" in the country, alongside Grand Funk Railroad. On July 7, the film Two-Lane Blacktop, co-starring Dennis Wilson, made its worldwide premiere in New York City. Despite critical acclaim, the film was largely unnoticed by cinema-goers.

Surf's Up was released on August 30 to more public anticipation than the Beach Boys had had for several years. Aided by some FM radio exposure, it outperformed Sunflower commercially and was their best selling album in years. On September 6, Time reported that the album was "doing well enough. Barely out, it is fast approaching $250,000 in sales." From September 22 to October 2, the band toured the eastern US, but the performances received mixed reviews. Their setlists included every song from the album except "'Til I Die" and "A Day in the Life of a Tree". Dennis also played solo piano renditions of his unreleased songs "Barbara" and "I've Got a Friend".

On October 28, the Beach Boys were the featured cover story on that date's issue of Rolling Stone. It included the first part of a lengthy two-part interview, titled "The Beach Boys: A California Saga", conducted by journalists Tom Nolan and David Felton. (Note: The second part was published for the issue dated November 11.) Unusually, the story devoted minimal attention to the group's music, and instead focused on the band's internal dynamics and history, particularly around the period when they fell out of step with the counterculture. (Note: According to journalist David Hepworth, the style was unprecedented in the field of music writing, and the "story within was destined to become a classic piece from that brief interlude when pop writing collided with New Journalism ... It combined admiration for the group's achievements with distaste for their strange, inner world in a way that hadn't been done before".) At the end of the month, Surf's Up peaked on the U.S. charts at number 29, becoming their highest-charting album there since Wild Honey (1967).

In the UK, Surf's Up was released by EMI's Stateside label in October and peaked at number 15. Rieley was unhappy with the delay, remarking that the album "sold more import copies than they sold of British pressings." The UK singles, "Long Promised Road" (B-side "Deirdre") and "Don't Go Near the Water" (B-side "Student Demonstration Time"), failed to chart. In November, "Surf's Up" (B-side "Don't Go Near the Water") was released as the last U.S. single and failed to chart.

== Contemporary reviews ==
Surf's Up received generally favorable reviews. Time's reviewer described it as "one of the most imaginatively produced LPs since last fall's All Things Must Pass by George Harrison and Phil Spector". A Rolling Stone writer stated: "the Beach Boys stage a remarkable comeback ... an LP that weds their choral harmonies to progressive pop and which shows youngest Wilson brother Carl stepping into the fore of the venerable outfit." In his review for the magazine, Arthur Schmidt was effused with the record, highlighting "Surf's Up" and "Disney Girls" as his favorite songs, and wrote: "This is a good album, probably as good as Sunflower, which is terrific ... It is certainly the most original in that it has contributed something purely its own." Richard Williams of The Times called the record "mostly very good" in his review;" in another review of the album from 1972, he wrote that it "won't disappoint anyone at all ... they've produced an album which fully backs up all that's recently been written and said about them." NME's Richard Green called it a "very good album, very different from anything they've done before."

Robert Christgau of The Village Voice was less impressed. While highlighting "Take a Load Off Your Feet" and "Disney Girls (1957)", he found most of the other songs forgettable and deemed the album the group's worst since 1968's Friends, writing that "Van Dyke Parks's wacked-out lyricist meandering is matched by the sophomoric spiritual quest of Jack Rieley, and the music drags hither and yon." In The Rag, Metal Mike Saunders deemed the press furor over the Beach Boys' reputed comeback "rubbish" and opined that Surf's Up suffered from the same issues as Sunflower, namely "horrendous production and engineering" and a lack of "focus". He wrote, "At any rate, the Brian Wilson Enigma remains unanswered, and the Beach Boys without him are just another rock group." The Guardian's Geoffrey Cannon felt that the album was inconsistent.

In a 1971 interview, Paul McCartney praised the album: "Have you got the new Beach Boys album, Surf’s Up? That's good, too."

Bruce Johnston later criticized the record: "To me, Surf's Up is, and always has been, one hyped up lie! It was a false reflection of The Beach Boys and one which Jack [Rieley] engineered right from the start. ... It made it look like Brian Wilson was more than just a visitor at those sessions. Jack made it appear as though Brian was really there all the time." (Note: From a performance standpoint, he cited 1971 as his favorite year of the group musically because their set lists focused on newer songs.) In another interview, Johnston said: "All I can say is that at the beginning, I thought that what he was trying to do was absolutely right on the money. He helped the band become aware of what our niche was in pop music."

== Retrospective assessments ==
Professional ratings
Review scores
Source	Rating
AllMusic	4/5 stars
Christgau's Record Guide	B−
Encyclopedia of Popular Music	5/5 stars
MusicHound Rock	4/5
Pitchfork (Sunflower/Surf's Up reissue)	8.9/10
The Rolling Stone Album Guide	3/5 stars
Uncut	4/5 stars

Music critic John Bush wrote "[Most of the] songs are enjoyable enough, but the last three tracks are what make Surf's Up such a masterpiece." Mojo critic Ross Bennett regarded Surf's Up as "the definitive version" of the Smile recordings, "with those crystalline vocals imbuing Parks' cryptic verses with a grace and simplicity missing from the 2004 reboot". Keith Phipps from The A.V. Club called it "the darkest album of the group's career, a record that also spotlighted a growing social conscience".

In 1974, the staff of NME ranked Surf's Up number 96 in its list of the Top 100 Albums of All Time. When the magazine surveyed its writers again in 1993, the album's position rose to number 46. In 2000, the record was voted number 230 in the third edition of Colin Larkin's All Time Top 1000 Albums. The record is also listed in the musical reference book 1001 Albums You Must Hear Before You Die. In 2004, Surf's Up was ranked number 61 on Pitchfork's list of "The Top 100 Albums of the 1970s". Contributor Dominique Leone wrote:

Surf's Up practically defines flawed greatness, via Carl Wilson's introspective, exotic folk-pop, manager Jack Rieley's devastating vocal on Brian's "A Day in the Life of a Tree," and Brian's own gorgeous "'Til I Die"—which might very well go down as his last truly great production. Today the eclectic, relaxed sound of this album is reflected in the work of Super Furry Animals, Stereolab, and Sufjan Stevens, but its power comes from the shy passion and sincere, spiritual convictions of its creators.

Conversely, Scott Schinder wrote in Icons of Rock (2006) that Surf's Up "lacked the solid group dynamic that had elevated Sunflower" despite two "impressive songwriting contributions from Carl". James E. Perone, writing in The 100 Greatest Bands of All Time (2015), opined that "the album's lyrical themes are so wide ranging that the social commentary tended to get somewhat lost, and the year 1971 was late enough in the counterculture era that 'Student Demonstration Time' and 'A Day in the Life of a Tree' seem like a case of too little, too late." Stebbins opined that the album suffered from a lack of Dennis songs and was not as strong as Sunflower. Record Collector's Jamie Atkins said that the lack of Dennis songs was balanced by the strong offerings from Carl, although Rieley's "awkward wordplay ... was rather less clever than he had perhaps intended. Happily, they did not detract from the quality of the songs:"

John Wetton named Surf's Up his favorite progressive rock album of all time, elaborating: "The summer of '71 had so many musical milestones ... but Surf's Up was a revelation. I was in Family, a major player in the first wave of British progressive bands, but this collection from the iconic California surf-pop band shifted my parameters, blurring all the boundaries of my musical vocabulary."

== Feel Flows ==
In 2021, expanded editions of Sunflower and Surf's Up were packaged within Feel Flows, a box set that includes session highlights, outtakes, and alternate mixes drawn from the two albums. The set also includes the first ever releases of the Surf's Up-era outtakes "Big Sur" (1970 version), "Sweet and Bitter", "My Solution", "Seasons in the Sun", "Baby Baby", "Awake", and "It's a New Day".

== Track listing ==
Side one
No.	Title	Writer(s)	Lead vocal(s)	Length
1.	"Don't Go Near the Water"	Mike Love, Al Jardine	Mike Love, Al Jardine, Brian Wilson	2:39
2.	"Long Promised Road"	Carl Wilson, Jack Rieley	Carl Wilson	3:30
3.	"Take a Load Off Your Feet"	Jardine, Brian Wilson, Gary Winfrey	B. Wilson, Jardine	2:29
4.	"Disney Girls (1957)"	Bruce Johnston	Bruce Johnston	4:07
5.	"Student Demonstration Time"	Jerry Leiber, Mike Stoller, Love	Love	3:58

Side two
No.	Title	Writer(s)	Lead vocal(s)	Length
1.	"Feel Flows"	C. Wilson, Rieley	C. Wilson	4:44
2.	"Lookin' at Tomorrow (A Welfare Song)"	Jardine, Winfrey	Jardine	1:55
3.	"A Day in the Life of a Tree"	B. Wilson, Rieley	Jack Rieley, Van Dyke Parks, Jardine	3:07
4.	"'Til I Die"	B. Wilson	C. Wilson, B. Wilson, Love	2:31
5.	"Surf's Up"	B. Wilson, Van Dyke Parks	C. Wilson, B. Wilson, Jardine	4:12
Total length:				33:49

== Personnel ==
Credits per Craig Slowinski.

The Beach Boys

- Al Jardine – lead (1, 3, 7, 8, 10) and backing vocals (1–5, 7–10); electric guitars (1); acoustic guitars (3, 7); banjos (1); piano (1); bass guitar (7)
- Bruce Johnston – lead (4) and backing vocals (1, 2, 4–10); pianos (4); Hammond organ (4, 7?, 9); Moog synthesizer (4); mandolins (4)
- Mike Love – lead (1, 5, 9) and backing vocals (1, 2, 4, 5, 8–10); tambourine (5)
- Brian Wilson – lead (3, 9, 10) and backing vocals (1–4, 6, 8–10); Baldwin organ (1?, 3); Hammond organ (9); harmonium (1?, 8); Moog synthesizer (8, 10?); Rocksichord (9); piano (10); harmonica (1?); bass guitar (3); snare drum (9); percussion (3, 9); Rolls-Royce Phantom V (3)
- Carl Wilson – lead (2, 6, 9, 10) and backing vocals (all tracks); electric guitars (1, 2, 5, 6); acoustic guitars (2, 8, 9); pianos (2, 6); pianos w/ taped strings (6); Wurlitzer electric pianos (2); Baldwin organ (6); Hammond organ (2, 10); Moog synthesizer (2, 6, 10?); bass guitar (6); drums (2, 7?); percussion (1, 2, 6, 10)
- Dennis Wilson – backing vocals (5, 10); drums (5)

Additional members from the touring band

- Ed Carter – electric and acoustic guitars (4)
- Daryl Dragon – Moog synthesizer (1, 5?); pipe organs (8); piano (1, 5); electric guitar (1); bass guitar (1, 9); vibraphone (9)
- Dennis Dragon – drums (4)
- Mike Kowalski – drums and percussion (1)

Guests

- Blondie Chaplin – bass guitar (5)
- Bill DeSimone – backing vocals (10)
- Kathy Dragon – flutes (4)
- Van Dyke Parks – vocals on "A Day in the Life of a Tree"
- Jack Rieley – lead vocals on "A Day in the Life of a Tree" and backing vocals in "Surf's Up" tag, breathing effects on “Feel Flows”
- Diane Rovell – backing vocals (2, 6)
- Marilyn Wilson – backing vocals (2, 6)
- Gary Winfrey – backing vocals (3)

Additional session musicians

- Arthur Brieglab – French horn (10)
- Jimmy Bond – double bass (10)
- Frank Capp – car keys (10); hi-hat (10)
- Al Casey – electric guitar (10)
- Roy Caton – trumpet (10)
- Al De Lory – pianos (10)
- David Duke – French horn (10); Wagner tuba (10)
- Glenn Ferris – trombone (5)
- Sam Freed – violin (3)
- David Frisina – violin (3)
- George Hyde – French horn (10)
- Anatol Kaminsky – violin (3)
- Nathan Kaproff – violin (3)
- George Kast – violin (3)
- Carol Kaye – bass guitar (10)
- Charles Lloyd – tenor saxophone (6); flute (6)
- Sal Marquez – trumpet (5)
- Roger Neumann – tenor saxophone (5)
- Nick Pellico – glockenspiel (10)
- Joel Peskin – tenor saxophone (5)
- Mike Price – trumpet (5)
- Claude Sherry – French horn (10)
- Woody Theus – bass drum (6); jingle sticks (6)

Additional musicians and production staff

- The Beach Boys – producer
- Stephen Desper – chief engineer and mixer; Moog synthesizer (6, 8–10); bird sfx (8)
- Ed Thrasher – original art direction

== Charts ==
Chart (1971)	Peak position
Australia (Go-Set)	32
Canadian RPM 100 Albums	22
UK Top 40 Albums	15
U.S. Billboard Top LPs & Tape	29

== Bibliography ==
- Badman, Keith (2004). The Beach Boys: The Definitive Diary of America's Greatest Band, on Stage and in the Studio. Backbeat Books. ISBN 978-0-87930-818-6.
- Bush, John (2002). "Surf's Up". In Bogdanov, Vladimir; Woodstra, Chris; Erlewine, Stephen Thomas (eds.). All Music Guide to Rock: The Definitive Guide to Rock, Pop, and Soul. Backbeat Books. ISBN 978-0-87930-653-3.
- Carlin, Peter Ames (2006). Catch a Wave: The Rise, Fall, and Redemption of the Beach Boys' Brian Wilson. Rodale. ISBN 978-1-59486-320-2.
- Doe, Andrew; Tobler, John (2004). Brian Wilson and the Beach Boys: The Complete Guide to Their Music. Omnibus. ISBN 9781844494262.
- Gaines, Steven (1986). Heroes and Villains: The True Story of The Beach Boys. New York: Da Capo Press. ISBN 0306806479.
- Leaf, David (1978). The Beach Boys and the California Myth. New York: Grosset & Dunlap. ISBN 978-0-448-14626-3.
- Stebbins, Jon (2011). The Beach Boys FAQ: All That's Left to Know About America's Band. Backbeat. ISBN 978-1-4584-2918-6.
