= 'Til I Die =

Single by the Beach Boys

from the album Surf's Up
- A-side: "Long Promised Road"
- Released: October 11, 1971
- Recorded: August 15, 1970 – July 30, 1971
- Studio: Beach Boys, Los Angeles
- Genre: Progressive pop
- Length: 2:29
- Label: Brother/Reprise
- Songwriter: Brian Wilson
- Producer: The Beach Boys

The Beach Boys singles chronology
"Long Promised Road" / "Deirdre" (1971)	"Long Promised Road" / "'Til I Die" (1971)	"Student Demonstration Time" / "Don't Go Near the Water" (1971)

"'Til I Die" is a song by American rock band the Beach Boys from their 1971 album Surf's Up, subsequently issued as the B-side of the single "Long Promised Road". With autobiographical lyrics about death and hopelessness, it is one of the few songs in which both the words and music were written solely by Brian Wilson. An extended mix of the original recording, created by engineer Stephen Desper, was included on the 1998 compilation Endless Harmony Soundtrack.

== Background and composition ==
"Till I Die"

Brian Wilson reportedly wrote "'Til I Die" while suffering from an existential crisis, having recently threatened to drive his car off the Santa Monica Pier and ordered his gardener to dig a grave in his backyard. According to biographer David Leaf, these episodes were treated as jokes by Wilson's family and friends. In a November 1970 interview, Wilson discussed his daily routine of "go[ing] to bed in the early hours of the morning and sleep[ing] until the early afternoon". He added: "I'm not unhappy with life; in fact I'm quite happy living at home." According to Wilson's (since-discredited) 1991 autobiography Wouldn't It Be Nice: My Own Story, the song was inspired by a late night trip to the beach:

Lately, I'd been depressed and preoccupied with death...Looking out toward the ocean, my mind, as it did almost every hour of every day, worked to explain the inconsistencies that dominated my life; the pain, torment, and confusion and the beautiful music I was able to make. Was there an answer? Did I have no control? Had I ever? Feeling shipwrecked on an existential island, I lost myself in the balance of darkness that stretched beyond the breaking waves to the other side of the earth. The ocean was so incredibly vast, the universe was so large, and suddenly I saw myself in proportion to that, a little pebble of sand, a jellyfish floating on top of the water; traveling with the current I felt dwarfed, temporary. The next day I began writing "Til I Die", perhaps the most personal song I ever wrote for The Beach Boys...In doing so, I wanted to re-create the swell of emotions that I'd felt at the beach the previous night.

The song was written over the course of several weeks as Wilson tried to express the feelings he had experienced that night at the beach. He explained: "I struggled at the piano, experimenting with rhythms and chord changes, trying to emulate in sound the ocean's shifting tides and moods as well as its sheer enormity. I wanted the music to reflect the loneliness of floating a raft in the middle of the Pacific. I wanted each note to sound as if it was disappearing into the hugeness of the universe."

Explaining how Wilson came up with the chords, Don Was recalled, "he told me that he was sitting at a piano, creating geometric patterns with his fingers, trying not to move the fingers on the outside of the patterns, but limiting changes to internal movements. When he landed on a shape that both looked cool and sounded good, he wrote it down. So, essentially he created this masterpiece by contorting his fingers into really groovy shapes." However, Was admitted to having "no idea whether this story has any basis in truth or whether he was just making it up on the spot to entertain me."

Asked how he came up with the song in a 2007 interview, Wilson answered, "Well, I put a b note in g major 7th chord and it was a 3rd in the chord, and the note in the key of g resonates pretty well. Lyrically, I tried to put nature in there. Earth, water, rocks and leaves. [sic]" He stated that the line "I'm a cork on the ocean" was the first lyric that came to him. Across three short verses, Wilson compares himself to a cork on the ocean, a rock in a landslide, and a leaf on a windy day—seeing himself as a small, helpless object, being moved inconceivable distances by forces beyond his comprehension. "How deep is the ocean? How long will the wind blow?" The hopeless conclusion is given in the song's title, which is repeated in the song's ending tag.

== Recording ==
Wilson recorded a solo piano demo of the song on November 4, 1969. According to some sources, when he presented the song to the band, one member initially voiced criticisms. Bruce Johnston remembered Brian "playing it for the band and one member of the band didn't understand it and put it down, and Brian just decided not to show it to us for a few months. He just put it away. I mean, he was absolutely crushed. This other person just didn't like it." Various sources state that Mike Love had called the song a "downer". Engineer Stephen Desper wrote that "the guys often thought the original lyrics to ['Til I Die] were drug derived." At one stage, to address the criticism, Wilson changed the lyrics from "It kills my soul" to "It holds me up" or "It fills my soul" and "I lost my way" to "I found my way". Ultimately, the rest of the group insisted that the original lyrics be kept, as the new lyrics contradicted the lyrics in the verses. A recording of the song with these alternate lyrics was released on the 2021 compilation Feel Flows.

The first dated session for the song was at Beach Boys Studio on August 15, 1970. Brian recorded five takes of the song although the song would be left only partially completed. Dennis Wilson was not present during this session due to filming dates for Two-Lane Blacktop, which resulted in a Maestro Rhythm King drum machine being used on the basic track. On August 26, the partially completed track was mixed although very little work was done on the recording until later the following year. The last dated session occurred on July 30, 1971. In Desper's recollection, Wilson played Hammond B3 organ while touring musician Daryl Dragon played vibraphone.

"Til I Die" was more or less an achievement in sound. ... After it was done I took a certain part of where I was singing and I made a mono tape loop and put my voice on the tape loop. I sent the loop into an echo chamber. I went into the echo chamber and listened to my voice in a circle and walked out of there in another world.

— Brian Wilson

Al Jardine said of the song, "it's really a good vocal sound, I think Desper deserves all the credit on that one, I mean we just had the best microphones, the best microphone technique and engineering on that particular piece and that particular time." Johnston stated that "the track is very simple...and the great, great vocal arrangement that [Brian Wilson] wrote. Really, a great piece of work."

An extended mix of the original recording, created by Desper, was included on the 1998 compilation album Endless Harmony Soundtrack. It is notable for having each instrumental layer come in after the other as an introduction and features more prominent vibraphone and organ throughout. The mix was reportedly done only for the engineer's self-interest. As Desper explains, the band "went out for lunch or something like that and since the song was already mounted and a mix up, I put together what I thought was a structure that better showcased the harmonic beauty of Brian's writing. Somewhere thereafter I did play the track for Carl, but only in the interest of disclosure, not to sway him to change the structure that Brian intended."

== Release ==
The song was first released on the band's album Surf's Up on August 30, 1971. On October 11, 1971, the song was released in the United States as the flip-side of the "Long Promised Road" single, which had also been released earlier that year in May with a different B-side. The single entered the Billboard charts on October 30 at No. 93 and peaked three weeks later at No. 89, where it remained for one more week until the single dropped off the chart. It was the first single by the group in 19 months to chart, but their lowest charting single to date; it remained so for a further eighteen years.

== Legacy and recognition ==
Bruce Johnston would later praise "'Til I Die" as the last great Brian Wilson song and Wilson's "heaviest song." Johnston has also stated that "the words absolutely fit his mindset". Wilson concurred that "the song summed up everything I had to say at the time." In 2015, Mike Love named the lyrics of "'Til I Die" his favorite of any written solely by Wilson, although he admitted, "I don't like the line 'it kills my soul' but I understand what he's saying." Beach Boys biographer Jon Stebbins wrote that the song "proves that Brian could not only write beautiful music, but that he had the ability to communicate honestly and artfully with his lyrics as well. The track is decorated with a haunting vibraphone and organ bed, which frames the strong harmony vocal arrangement perfectly."

Wilson recorded a new version of the song – along with an accompanying video – for inclusion in the 1995 documentary Brian Wilson: I Just Wasn't Made for These Times and its soundtrack album. This version, co-produced by Wilson and Don Was, is much more sparse than the original. Brian's re-recording of the song was released as the second track on a relatively rare UK single in 1995. However, the single failed to make any impact on the charts. On April 7 and 8, 2000, Wilson and his band recorded a live version of the song—based on Desper's extended mix—for inclusion on Brian's 2000 live album Live at the Roxy Theatre.

A sample of the song appears as part of the soundtrack to the 2014 film Love & Mercy in the cue "The Bed Montage", composed by Atticus Ross.

== Personnel ==
Credits from Craig Slowinski

The Beach Boys

- Al Jardine - backing vocals
- Bruce Johnston - backing vocals, Hammond organ
- Mike Love - lead and backing vocals
- Brian Wilson - lead and backing vocals, Hammond organ, Rocksichord, snare drum, Maestro Rhythm King MRK-2 drum machine
- Carl Wilson - lead and backing vocals, acoustic guitar
- Dennis Wilson - backing vocals

Additional musicians

- Daryl Dragon - bass guitar, vibraphone
- Stephen W. Desper - Moog synthesizer

== Cover versions ==
- 1992 – Downy Mildew, "Elevator" EP
- 1993 – Medicine, "Never Click" single
- 1996 – The Josephine Wiggs Experience, Bon Bon Lifestyle
- 1997 – The Wilsons, The Wilsons (co-produced by Brian)
- 1997 – The Elements, Wouldn't It Be Nice: A Jazz Portrait of Brian Wilson
- 1997 – Clark Burroughs Group, Wouldn't It Be Nice: A Jazz Portrait of Brian Wilson
- 2000 – Christy McWilson, The Lucky One.
- 2002 – Doug Powell, Making God Smile: An Artists' Tribute to the Songs of Beach Boy Brian Wilson.
- 2005 – Barenaked Ladies, performing an acoustic version of the song at a MusiCares concert honoring Brian Wilson. This performance was later released on DVD.
- 2006 – Marty Rudnick, More Songs About Cars and Girls.
- 2010 – Lightspeed Champion, Bye Bye EP
- 2013 – Chris Schlarb, Psychic Temple II (features Sufjan Stevens and Ikey Owens)
