= Like a Brother =

Studio album by Beckley-Lamm-Wilson
- Released: 2000
- Recorded: 1992–1998
- Genre: Adult contemporary
- Length: 41:56
- Label: Transparent Music
- Producers: Phil Galdston, Gerry Beckley, Robert Lamm, Carl Wilson, Steve Levine

Gerry Beckley chronology
Go Man Go (2000)	Like a Brother (2000)	Horizontal Fall (2006)

Robert Lamm chronology
In My Head (1999)	Like A Brother (2000)	Subtlety & Passion (2003)

Carl Wilson chronology
Youngblood (1983)	Like a Brother (2000)

Professional ratings
Review scores
Source	Rating
AllMusic	4.5/5 stars

Like a Brother is the only collaborative album by America's Gerry Beckley, Chicago's Robert Lamm, and the Beach Boys' Carl Wilson. It was also the final studio album by Wilson. It was released in 2000, two years after Wilson had died from lung cancer, and it was the last album he recorded before his death. The trio first appeared together on a rendition of "Without Her" from the 1995 Harry Nilsson tribute album For the Love of Harry: Everybody Sings Nilsson, followed by "Watching The Time Go By" from Lamm's 1999 solo album In My Head.

== Track listing ==
No.	Title	Writer(s)	Lead vocals	Length
1.	"Today"	John Waite, Phil Galdston	Carl Wilson	4:15
2.	"Feel the Spirit"	Phil Galdston, Robert Lamm, Peter Wolf	Robert Lamm	5:11
3.	"I Wish for You"	Carl Wilson, Robert White Johnson, Galdston	Wilson	3:01
4.	"Run Don't Walk"	Wilson, Galdston	Wilson	3:55
5.	"Watching the Time"	Gerry Beckley	Gerry Beckley with Lamm and Wilson	3:52
6.	"Life in Motion"	Lamm, Gerard McMahon	Lamm	4:30
7.	"Sheltering Sky"	Beckley	Beckley with Lamm and Wilson	3:20
8.	"They're Only Words"	Wilson, Galdston	Wilson	4:40
9.	"Without Her" (from the album For the Love of Harry: Everybody Sings Nilsson)	Harry Nilsson	Beckley	4:29
10.	"Like a Brother"	Wilson, Galdston	Wilson	4:43

2001 Japanese CD bonus tracks
No.	Title	Writer(s)	Lead vocals	Length
11.	"Standing at Your Door"	Lamm, John Van Eps	Lamm	4:25
12.	"Blue After All"	Lamm, Bruce Gaitsch	Lamm	4:22
13.	"In the Dark"	Beckley, Galdston	Beckley	5:27

== Personnel ==
Credits from the original liner notes, as re-published on albumlinernotes.com.

- Gerry Beckley – lead and backing vocals, acoustic guitars, mandolin, producer
- Robert Lamm – lead and backing vocals, keyboards, producer
- Carl Wilson – lead and backing vocals, electric guitars, producer
- Paul Livant – electric guitars
- Steve Tarshis – electric guitars
- Michael Thompson – guitars
- Jason Scheff – bass
- Phil Galdston – keyboards, programming, producer
- John Van Tongeren – keyboards
- Tom Hammer – keyboards
- Sammy Merendino – drums
- Jimmy Hunter – drums
- Michael Fisher – percussion
- Timmy Cappello – saxophone
- Van Dyke Parks – accordion
- Steve Levine – producer ("Watching the Time", "Life in Motion", "Sheltering Sky")
