= Museum for the United Nations - UN Live =

Global institution based in Copenhagen, Denmark

- Established: 2016
- Location: Copenhagen, Denmark
- CEO: Molly Fannon
- Website: http://museumfortheun.org/

The Museum for the United Nations — UN Live is a global institution working out of Copenhagen, with hubs in Nairobi and New Delhi . Its mission is to “unleash the power of culture to inspire local action and drive global change”. UN Live describes itself as an unconventional and borderless museum that seeks to reach and connect people on a global scale to the values and work of the United Nations. While formally stewarding the brand of the United Nations, UN Live is an independent institution.

== History ==
The adoption of the Sustainable Development Goals in 2015 inspired the four cofounders Olafur Eliasson, Jan Mattsson, Emil Rostgaard Schelde, and Henrik Skovby to establish the Museum for the United Nations. One year later, then United Nations Secretary-General Ban Ki-moon formally endorsed the institution. Between 2019 and 2023 UN Live was led by Molly Fannon. In September 2023 Katja Iversen took over as CEO.

== Approach ==
UN Live leverages cultural programmes, in the fields of music, film, art, sports, games, comedy, and beyond, to connect and engage people globally and drive behavior change. This approach stems from empirical findings in the field of behavioural science that suggest that (mass) culture can shift norms and values and change individual behavior patterns. Thereby, mass culture communication can generate profound changes in social and environmental outcomes.

Over the past years, UN Live launched several programmes, including a collaboration with two Bollywood productions thematizing the consequences of climate change and a digital artwork in partnership with Studio Olafur Eliasson and AKQA enhancing children’s voices within the climate agenda.

During Climate Week NYC in 2022, UN Live supported by IKEA Foundation launched the programme ‘Global We for Climate Action’. The aim of the programme is to bring underrepresented voices, such as youth and indigenous people, and diversity into the global climate conversation and by doing so allow young people and communities most affected by climate change to have two-way conversations with world leaders. In collaboration with Shared Studios, a network of portals across 25+ locations is established. Portals are repurposed shipping containers that are equipped with large screens and high-quality audio to create immersive experiences and to enable real-live conversations across countries. During COP27, a portal will be set up in Sharm El-Sheik and connected to portals in various other locations, including Kigali, Rwanda; Erbil, Iraq and Mexico City, Mexico.

== Funding ==
As an independent not-for-profit NGO registered in Copenhagen, Denmark, UN Live is privately funded by Foundation and independent supporters.
