= Don't Go Near the Water (The Beach Boys song) =

- UK single cover

Song by the Beach Boys

from the album Surf's Up
- Released: August 30, 1971
- Recorded: April 3, 1971
- Length: 2:39
- Label: Brother/Reprise
- Songwriters: Mike Love, Al Jardine
- Producer: The Beach Boys

Licensed audio
- "Don't Go Near the Water" on YouTube

"Don't Go Near the Water" is a song by American rock band the Beach Boys from their 1971 album Surf's Up. Written by Mike Love and Al Jardine, the song puts an ironic, ecological spin on the traditional Beach Boys beach- and surf- based songs: instead of enjoying surfing and other fun activities, this time the listener is advised to avoid the water for environmental reasons.

== Background and recording ==
The song was recorded at the same session as "Long Promised Road" and "4th of July", both also recorded for Surf's Up. The lead vocals are by the song's composers, Love and Jardine. According to biographer Peter Ames Carlin, Brian Wilson contributed the dissonant piano part. However, in a 2007 interview, Wilson stated of the song, "Totally Alan’s trip. I was not part of that." Jardine spoke about the song in a 2021 interview:

I love that. I could've done a much better job, but Mike insisted on putting these meditation lyrics in it, whereas I wanted it to be more dramatic. But sometimes you just have to go with the flow, because you're a team. He sang the lead and the lead singer always gets the upper hand. Daryl Dragon helped a lot too. He was the piano assistant and we had those crazy little chords going on there.

Unused lyrics for the song mentioned the narrator's father in reference to the water: "I think it killed my dad".

== Release ==
The song was the B-side of the "Surf's Up" single, released on November 8, 1971. It did not chart. Featured as an A-side in New Zealand, it peaked at #21 there. It was later released on November 2, 1981 as the B-side of the "Come Go with Me" single. The single charted at #18 in the U.S. but never charted in the UK.

== Personnel ==
Credits from Craig Slowinski.

The Beach Boys

- Al Jardine – co-lead and backing vocals, tack piano, electric guitars (fed through a Moog), banjos
- Bruce Johnston – backing vocals
- Mike Love – lead and backing vocals
- Brian Wilson – co-lead and backing vocals, harmonica, harmonium, Baldwin organ
- Carl Wilson – backing vocals, electric lead guitar, tambourine; possible guiro

Session musicians

- Daryl Dragon – grand piano, Moog synthesizer, electric rhythm guitar, bass guitar
- Mike Kowalski – drums; possible guiro
