= Deirdre (song) =

Single by the Beach Boys

from the album Sunflower
- A-side: "Long Promised Road"
- Released: May 24, 1971
- Recorded: February 21 – March 21, 1969
- Studio: Gold Star, Hollywood
- Genre: Pop
- Length: 3:27
- Label: Brother
- Songwriters: Bruce Johnston; Brian Wilson
- Producer: The Beach Boys

The Beach Boys singles chronology
"Wouldn't It Be Nice (Live)" (1971)	"Deirdre" (1971)	"Surf's Up" (1971)

"Deirdre" is a song by the American rock band the Beach Boys from their 1970 album Sunflower. Written primarily by Bruce Johnston, it is a love song named after the sister of one of his ex-girlfriends, and is one of his two song contributions on the album, the other being "Tears in the Morning". Johnston has claimed that co-writer Brian Wilson's contributions were limited to a few lyrics, although music historians Andrew G. Doe and John Tobler wrote in 2004 that "Deirdre" had been "developed from a musical theme first used in 'We're Together Again,'" a 1968 composition credited to Brian Wilson and singer Ron Wilson (no relation).

In 1971, "Deirdre" was issued as the B-side of the "Long Promised Road" single. The single never charted in the US or the UK. In 1977, Johnston rerecorded the song for his solo album Going Public. The song was released by CBS in the UK as a single in 1977 (with "Thank You Baby" – also from the album – on the B-side) but although it got some airplay, it never charted.

== Background ==
"Deirdre" was named after the sister of one of Bruce Johnston's ex-girlfriends (and may also have alluded to Deirdre Shaw, the daughter of Angela Lansbury and a onetime peripheral member of the Manson Family). Biographer Timothy White described the song as "a stroll-tempo devotional to an idealized, red-haired goddess; its stippled use of flutes plus the spacey filtering and compression techniques in the vocal mixes giving the track a celestial grandeur."

In an undated interview with the New Musical Express, Johnston credited Brian with only contributing four lines to the lyrics to "Deirdre". Asked about the song in 2013, Johnston explained:

I wrote all the music for the song and started writing the lyrics with Brian although that's not his strong point, even though we must remember that Brian wrote all the lyrics for songs like "Surfer Girl" and "'Til I Die". So "Deirdre" was kind of my song and I split it 50/50 with him. It's really about 99% my baby.

The song was recorded at Gold Star Studios on February 21 and March 21, 1969. In 2021, the instrumental track was included on the band's box set Feel Flows.

== Reception ==
In their review of Sunflower, a Rolling Stone critic mentioned that the song "could be Beach Boys-influenced anybody". Reviewing the song for AllMusic, Matthew Greenwald wrote, "Taking his cues from 1930s-'40s musicals, this lighthearted pop gem is a great example of Bruce Johnston's musical style and fine overall pop sensibility."

Later in the 1970s, after he had launched a solo career, Johnston said in an interview that he regretted recording the song as a track by the Beach Boys.

== In popular culture ==
- In 1994, "Deirdre" was used as a music sample in the video game EarthBound. A sample of the a capella intro of the song is arranged into the music for the Cave of the Past area near the end of the game.
  - The 2015 video game Undertale features several music tracks made entirely out of samples from EarthBound. One of them, titled "Amalgam" in the game's soundtrack, samples EarthBound's Cave of the Past music and, by extension, the Beach Boys song as well.

== Personnel ==
Sourced from Craig Slowinski and Timothy White.

The Beach Boys

- Al Jardine – harmony and backing vocals
- Bruce Johnston – lead vocals, opening multi-tracked harmonies, harmony and backing vocals, production
- Mike Love – harmony and backing vocals
- Brian Wilson – harmony and backing vocals
- Carl Wilson – harmony and backing vocals

Additional personnel

- Ed Carter – guitar
- Al Casey – guitar
- Joe Osborn – electric bass
- Jimmy Bond – double bass
- Larry Knechtel – piano
- Daryl Dragon — vibraphone
- John Guerin – drums
- Frank Capp – tambourine
- Michel Colombier – string arrangement
- unknown – three flutes, one trumpet, three French horns, three trombones

Production staff

- Stephen Desper – engineer
- Doc Siegel – engineer
