= Feel Flows =

Song by the Beach Boys

from the album Surf's Up
- Released: August 30, 1971
- Recorded: July 29, 1971
- Genre: Progressive pop; jazz-rock; psychedelic rock
- Length: 4:44
- Label: Brother/Reprise
- Songwriters: Carl Wilson, Jack Rieley
- Producer: The Beach Boys

Licensed audio
- "Feel Flows" on YouTube

Audio sample
- file; help

"Feel Flows" is a song recorded by American rock band the Beach Boys from their 1971 album Surf's Up. It was written by guitarist Carl Wilson and band manager Jack Rieley, and was one of Wilson's first songs.

== Background and recording ==
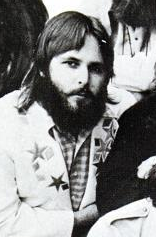
Wilson in 1971

The basic track of "Feel Flows" was recorded before Wilson asked Rieley to pen lyrics for the song. In 1971, Wilson explained to Rolling Stone how he produced the keyboard sound effects:

I played piano first and then I played organ. I played piano twice, overdubbed it, and used a variable speed oscillator to make the track different speeds so that the piano would be a little bit out of tune, sort of a spread sound ... And then I put the organ on and put it through the Moog at the same time, so that one side of the stereo had the direct organ sound and the other side had the return through the Moog synthesizer.

Asked about the song in a 2013 interview, Rieley said:

One of the finest experiences in a studio that I had. Carl put together a raw-bones concept and gave me a tape, I took it home and listened to it over and over. The lyrics started coming out of me: a reflection of the sensitive side of life. I'm so proud of them. Carl's guitar solo might be the best he ever played. There is a point in the song where you hear a synth and then there’s a "swoosh" sound. Carl and I have been told by a number of girls that that was the closest they’d heard to the sound that would go with an orgasm.

Wilson's lead vocals were recorded using reverse echo. The saxophone and flute were both played by jazz musician Charles Lloyd, as Mike Love commented, "It's amazing. It's unlike anything we ever did."

== Reception ==
Biographer Jon Stebbins identified the song as a highlight on Surf's Up. He said that Jack Rieley's lyrics were "nonsensical but fit Carl's airy jazz-rock song perfectly. The trippy phasing and synthesizer elements in 'Feel Flows,' which are tailor-made for a stoner's headphones, undoubtedly delighted more than a few hippies who stumbled upon the Surf's Up LP. ... as modern and progressive as the majority of 'heavy' music in the mainstream rock world of 1971." Conversely, biographer Peter Ames Carlin criticized the lyrics as "impossibly cryptic". Record Collector's Jamie Atkins wrote that, "despite the hamfisted lyrics", the song "remains sonically intriguing, with the lightness of touch and natural feel for arranging that had served Brian so well."

== Almost Famous ==
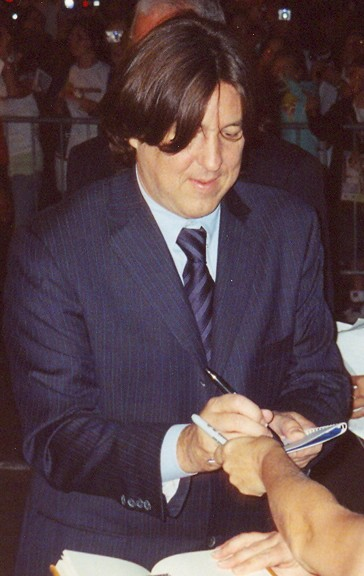
Cameron Crowe is credited with popularizing the song after featuring it in his 2000 film Almost Famous

Director Cameron Crowe used the song twice in his 2000 film Almost Famous. It first plays during a scene in which the protagonist meets a groupie, and reappears in the end credits.

Crowe cited "Feel Flows" as his favorite Beach Boys song and explained that it contains "the happy/sad greatness that defines the group and the timelessness that allows The Beach Boys to tower over any attempt to classify them as simple poster boys for the California experience. It is the essence of the fulfilled promise of The Beach Boys and everything Brian envisioned for their creative journey."

According to biographer Mark Dillon, the song received "new life from exposure in the film and inclusion on its Grammy Award–winning soundtrack."

== Other uses ==
- In 1972, the song was used in the surfing documentary Five Summer Stories.
- In 2005, it appeared on a compilation album of music that has inspired the Welsh indie-psychedelic pop band the Super Furry Animals titled Under the Influence.
- In 2021, the song's title was adopted for Feel Flows, an archival release dedicated to the band's Sunflower and Surf's Up period.

== Personnel ==
Credits from Craig Slowinski and Tom Nolan.

The Beach Boys

- Carl Wilson – lead and backing vocals, vocal noises, electric guitar, bass guitar, pianos, pianos w/ taped strings, Baldwin organ, Moog synthesizer, jingle sticks
- Brian Wilson – backing vocals
- Bruce Johnston – backing vocals

Additional musicians

- Stephen W. Desper - Moog programming
- Charles Lloyd – tenor saxophone, flute
- Diane Rovell - backing vocals
- Jack Rieley - vocal noises
- Woody Theus – bass drum, jingle sticks
- Marilyn Wilson - backing vocals
