= Jack Rieley =

American DJ, record producer, and songwriter (1942–2015)

- Rieley c. 1974

Background information
- Born: John Frank Rieley III; November 24, 1942; Milwaukee, Wisconsin
- Died: April 17, 2015 (aged 72) Berlin, Germany
- Occupations: Musician, songwriter, disc jockey, record producer, entrepreneur
- Instrument: Piano
- Years active: 1960s–2015

John Frank Rieley III (November 24, 1942 – April 17, 2015) was an American businessman, record producer, songwriter, and disc jockey who managed the Beach Boys in the early 1970s. He is credited with guiding them back to popular acclaim and was described by New Statesman as "a radio DJ turned career mentor."

Rieley co-wrote a total of ten songs included on the Beach Boys' albums Surf’s Up (1971), Carl and the Passions – "So Tough" (1972), and Holland (1973). He also sang lead on the Surf's Up track "A Day in the Life of a Tree" and narrated Brian Wilson's fairy tale Mount Vernon and Fairway (1972).

Following his work with The Beach Boys, Rieley made the rock book project Western Justice with Machiel Botman in 1975. He would later go on to collaborate with artists such as Kool & the Gang, Ride, and Jaye Muller (recording as "Count Jaye").

In 1995, Rieley, along with Muller, founded e-fax pioneer J2 Global, Inc., which later became Ziff Davis following its $167 million acquisition of the digital publishing company. He died in 2015 at the age of 72.

== Background ==
Rieley was born in Milwaukee, Wisconsin.

== The Beach Boys ==
The Beach Boys met Rieley while promoting their album Sunflower, and hired him as their manager. He wrote and co-wrote lyrics to several of the Beach Boys songs including "Long Promised Road", "Feel Flows", "Sail On, Sailor", "Funky Pretty" and "The Trader". He sang lead vocal on "A Day in the Life of a Tree". He also narrated the bonus disc for the Holland album: "Mt. Vernon and Fairway (A Fairy Tale)".

Rieley falsely claimed to have been a Peabody Award and Pulitzer Prize-winning journalist for NBC News. Brian Wilson later wrote a song about Rieley's tendency for falsehoods, titling it "Is Jack Rieley Really Superman?". As of 2014, a recording of the song has not surfaced.

Several months after the release of Holland, Rieley disassociated from the Beach Boys. Ricky Fataar stated, "In the middle of all the in fighting that afflicted the group, Jack was the person trying to hold everything together. [...] Eventually, we realised that Rieley was very much into manipulating the arguments, starting stories and telling tales—a divide and conquer mentality. When that came to light, we had to let him go." Alternatively, biographer Mark Holcomb states that Rieley resigned from the position. Rieley gave his side of the story in a 2013 interview,

I chose to stay in Holland after the album was done. First, I was gonna try living there for a couple of months, but then I realised I didn’t like these long flights to LA to deal with, frankly, a lot of madness in the band. Some of the madness centred around the divisions in the group and the petty jealousies and avarice of certain members. It was also about how Brian Wilson was a very funky guy prone to excesses that were sometimes amusing, sometimes idiosyncratic and sometimes really over the top. I just got tired of all that stuff. So the next time I was asked to come out for a meeting, I decided that I was gonna quit. Carl felt it was a betrayal but it wasn’t. I had to move on. I maintained my relationship with Carl and Dennis and we remained very close. I also stayed close with Brian to a lesser extent. There was a period where he felt I was leaving them in the lurch, which was not true.

Biographer Steven Gaines offered, "It was reportedly noticed by members of the group that Jack's young male assistant seemed to be living with him. Whether the relationship was sexual or not was never determined, but in the homophobic enclave of the Beach Boys, enough of a shadow had been cast. ... Carl made the trip back to Holland and fired Rieley."

Although there are many books and articles about the Beach Boys, Rieley was rarely interviewed before November 2007 when he was interviewed by Flasher.com in relation to the documentary Dennis Wilson Forever. The first seems to have been in summer 1982, for the UK fanzine Beach Boys Stomp.

== Other work ==
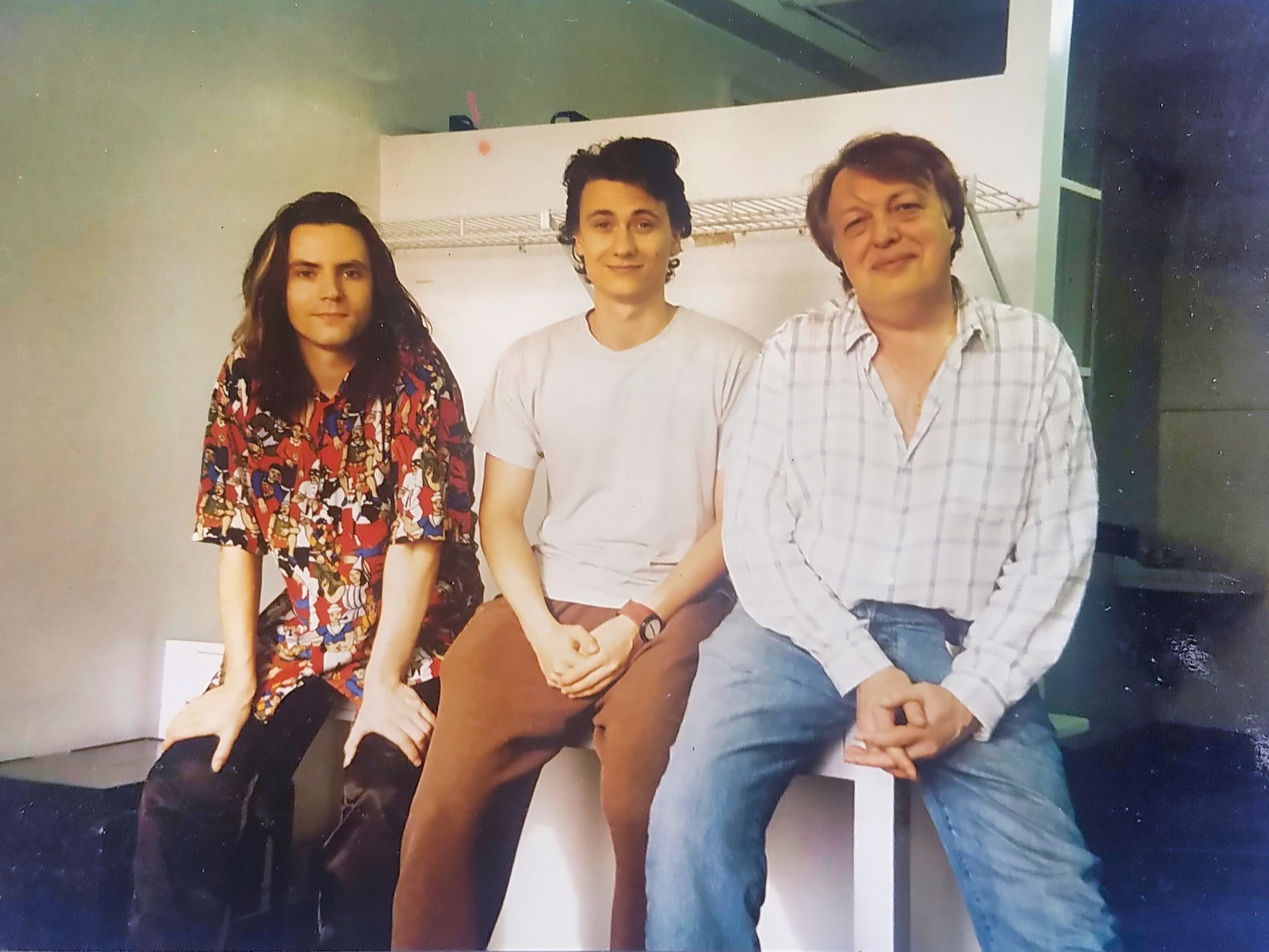
Jack Rieley (right) with JFAX cofounder Jaye Muller (left) in 1996 at their first office

Rieley worked with Kool and the Gang. In 1975, he released a solo album, Western Justice. Recorded in the Netherlands in collaboration with Machiel Botman, it dealt with the treatment of the old world powers by the newly emerging third world in the context of a global weather crisis. Rieley took the lead vocal on three songs, including the title track.

In the 1990s Rieley collaborated with several artists including Mark Gardener of the UK group Ride as well as with Jaye Muller and Ben Patton of the writing/production team Muller and Patton.

In 1995, Rieley and Muller co-founded JFAX Personal Telecom Inc., also known as JFAX.com. The company later rebranded as J2 Global before acquiring and merging with Ziff Davis. (Nasdaq: JCOM) Today, Ziff Davis operates as a technology holding company, its assets including popular gaming and entertainment news website IGN. Along with Muller, Rieley is recognized as the inventor of the electronic fax.

== Death ==
Rieley died on April 17, 2015, while residing in Berlin, Germany. Brian Wilson's social media posted a memorial, attributed to Wilson, which stated, "Sad to hear about Jack Rieley passing away. Jack was our manager in the early 70s and helped us a lot. My thoughts go out to Jack’s family." However, during the filming of the 2021 documentary Brian Wilson: Long Promised Road, Wilson said he had been unaware of Rieley's death, and became visibly upset after being informed of the fact.

== Bibliography ==
- Doggett, Peter (1997). "Hold On Dear Brother: The Beach Boys Without Brian Wilson". In Abbott, Kingsley (ed.). Back to the Beach: A Brian Wilson and the Beach Boys Reader (1st ed.). London: Helter Skelter. pp. 99–103. ISBN 978-1900924023.
- Gaines, Steven (1986). Heroes and Villains: The True Story of The Beach Boys (1st ed.). New York: Da Capo Press. ISBN 0306806479.
- Leaf, David (1978). The Beach Boys and the California Myth. Grosset & Dunlap. ISBN 978-0-448-14626-3.
