= Long Promised Road =

1971 Beach Boys song

Single by the Beach Boys

from the album Surf's Up
- B-side: "Deirdre"
- Released: May 24, 1971
- Recorded: April 3, 1971
- Length: 3:30
- Label: Brother/Reprise
- Songwriters: Carl Wilson, Jack Rieley
- Producer: The Beach Boys

The Beach Boys singles chronology
| "Wouldn't It Be Nice (live)" / "Deirdre" (1971) | "Long Promised Road" / "Deirdre" (1971) | "Long Promised Road" / "'Til I Die" (1971) |

Licensed audio
- "Long Promised Road" on YouTube

"Long Promised Road" is a song by the American rock band the Beach Boys from their 1971 album Surf's Up. It was written by Carl Wilson and Jack Rieley. Aside from a few guitar instrumentals written in the early days of the band and collective co-writing credits, the song is Wilson's first solo composition, and he plays all of the instruments himself.

== Background ==
Asked about the song in a 2013 interview, Jack Rieley said:

That was the first Beach Boys lyric I wrote; Carl asked me to have a hand in it. I felt that I was onto something. Van Dyke Parks wrote ethereal lyrics. Surf’s Up's a masterpiece but it’s also ethereal. I was writing personal lyrics – love songs with a sense of poetry. I was trying to tell the tale of life and love that we go through at different times in life. I adore the English language so much [and it] gave me the opportunity to stretch out. Carl and I were experimenting with chemicals, and it enhanced that song. I wanted to see Carl make something extraordinary. His vocal is so precious on it. There’s that screaming deep guitar which holds the song together and gives it relevancy beyond the first minute and 30 seconds. I worked very hard with him on his performance, which was stellar. Carl was really proud of it.

== Release ==
The song was first released as a single in May 1971, and did not chart. It was then included on Surf's Up, and was re-released as a single, with a different b-side, "'Til I Die", in October of the same year. This time it made it to No. 89 on the Billboard Hot 100.

Brian Wilson, who regularly included the song in his solo concerts, described it as "an incredible tune."

== Personnel ==
Credits from Craig Slowinski.

The Beach Boys

- Al Jardine – backing vocals
- Bruce Johnston – backing vocals
- Mike Love – backing vocals
- Brian Wilson – backing vocals
- Carl Wilson – lead and backing vocals, Wurlitzer electronic pianos, grand piano, upright piano, Hammond organ, Moog synthesizer, electric and acoustic guitars, drums, tambourine, shakers, temple blocks, ride cymbal swell

Guests

- Diane Rovell – backing vocals
- Marilyn Wilson – backing vocals
