= Carl Wilson =

American musician (1946–1998)

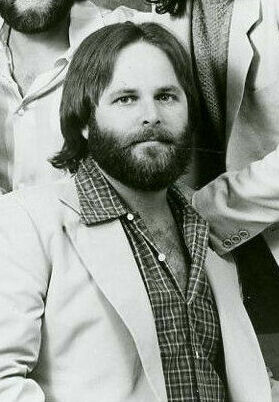
- Wilson in 1979

Background information
- Born: Carl Dean Wilson; December 21, 1946; Hawthorne, California, U.S.
- Died: February 6, 1998 (aged 51) Los Angeles, California, U.S.
- Genres: Rock; pop
- Occupations: Musician; singer; songwriter; record producer
- Instruments: Vocals; guitar
- Years active: 1961–1998
- Labels: Capitol; Brother; Reprise; CBS; Caribou
- Formerly of: The Beach Boys; Kenny & the Cadets; Beckley-Lamm-Wilson
- Website: carlwilsonfoundation.org

Carl Dean Wilson (December 21, 1946 – February 6, 1998) was an American musician, singer, and songwriter who co-founded the Beach Boys. He was their lead guitarist, the youngest sibling of bandmates Brian and Dennis, and the group's de facto leader in the early to mid-1970s. He was also the band's musical director on stage from 1965 until his death.

Influenced by the guitar playing of Chuck Berry and the Ventures, Wilson's initial role in the group was that of lead guitarist and backing singer, but he performed lead vocals on several of their later hits, including "God Only Knows" (1966), "Good Vibrations" (1966), "Darlin'" (1967), "I Can Hear Music" (1969) and "Kokomo" (1988). More often than other members of the band, he frequently played alongside the session musicians employed during the group's critical and commercial peak in the mid-1960s. During the period of Brian's reduced involvement with the group, Carl produced the bulk of their recordings from 20/20 (1969) through Holland (1973). Concurrently, he spent several years challenging his draft status as a conscientious objector.

During the 1980s, Wilson launched a solo career, releasing the albums Carl Wilson (1981) and Youngblood (1983). In the 1990s, he recorded material with Gerry Beckley and Robert Lamm, later released for the posthumous album Like a Brother (2000). He was inducted into the Rock and Roll Hall of Fame as a member of the Beach Boys in 1988. Wilson was also a member of the Movement of Spiritual Inner Awareness, a religious corporation. He died on February 6, 1998, at the age of 51, of lung cancer.

== Biography ==
=== Early years and success ===
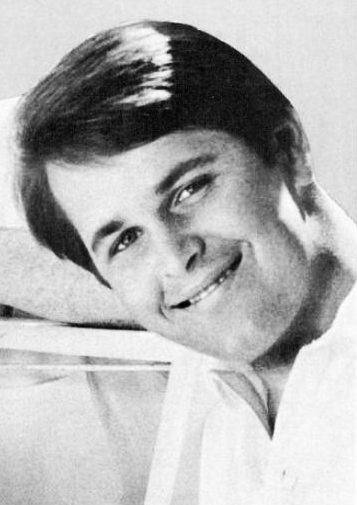
Wilson in 1965

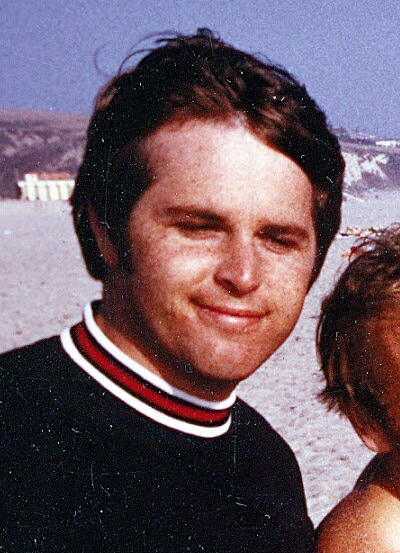
Wilson in 1967

Carl Dean Wilson was born the youngest of the three Wilson boys in Hawthorne, California, the youngest son of Audree Neva (née Korthof) and Murry Gage Wilson. From his pre-teens he practiced harmony vocals under the guidance of his brother Brian, who often sang in the family music room with his mother and brothers. Inspired by country star Spade Cooley, at the age of 12, Carl asked his parents to buy him a guitar, for which he took some lessons. In 1982, Carl remembered from this time: "The kid across the street, David Marks, was taking guitar lessons from John Maus, so I started, too. David and I were about 12 and John was only three years older, but we thought he was a shit-hot guitarist. John and his sister Judy did fraternity gigs together as a duo. Later John moved to England and became one of the Walker Brothers. ... He showed me some fingerpicking techniques and strumming stuff that I still use. When I play a solo, he's still there." While Brian perfected the band's vocal style and keyboard base, Carl's Chuck Berry-esque guitar became an early Beach Boys trademark. While in high school, Carl also studied saxophone.

Turning 15 as the group's first hit, "Surfin'", broke locally in Los Angeles, Carl's father and manager, Murry (who had sold his business to support his sons' band), bought him a Fender Jaguar guitar. Carl developed as a musician and singer through the band's early recordings, and the early "surf lick" sound heard in "Fun, Fun, Fun" was recorded in 1964 when Carl was 17. Also in 1964, Carl contributed his first co-writing credit on a Beach Boys single with the guitar riff and solo in "Dance, Dance, Dance" co-written with Mike Love and Brian Wilson. By the end of 1964, he was diversifying, favoring the 12-string Rickenbacker that was also notably used by Roger McGuinn in establishing the sound of the Byrds and by George Harrison of The Beatles during this era. Dave Marsh, in The Rolling Stone Illustrated History of Rock & Roll (1976), stated that Pete Townshend of The Who expanded on both R&B and rock "influenced heavily by Beach Boy Carl Wilson".

Carl's lead vocals in the band's first three years were infrequent. Although all members of the band played on their early recordings, Brian began to employ experienced session musicians to play on the group's instrumental tracks by 1965 to assist with the complex material, but the band was not eliminated from recording the instrumental tracks and still continued to play on certain songs on each album. Unlike the other members of the band, Carl often played alongside session musicians and also recorded his individual guitar leads during the Beach Boys' vocal sessions, with his guitar plugged directly into the soundboard. His playing can be heard on the introduction to "California Girls", throughout the 1965 album The Beach Boys Today! and on "That's Not Me" from Pet Sounds.

After Brian's retirement from touring in 1965, Carl became the musical director of the band onstage. Contracts at that time stipulated that promoters hire "Carl Wilson plus four other musicians". Following his lead vocal performance on "God Only Knows" in 1966, Carl was increasingly lead vocalist for the band, a role previously dominated by Mike Love and Brian. He sang leads on the singles "Good Vibrations", "Darlin'", and "Wild Honey". Starting with the album Wild Honey, Brian requested that Carl become more involved in the Beach Boys' records.

=== Production efforts ===
"Feel Flows" from Surf's Up (1971)
"Feel Flows" was written by Carl Wilson with band manager Jack Rieley.

In 1969, the Beach Boys' rendition of "I Can Hear Music" was the first track produced solely by Carl Wilson. By then, he had effectively become the band's in-studio leader, producing the bulk of the albums during the early 1970s. Though Carl had written surf instrumentals for the band in the early days, he was not featured as a songwriter until the 1971 album Surf's Up, for which he composed "Long Promised Road" and "Feel Flows", with lyrics by the band's then-manager Jack Rieley. Carl considered "Long Promised Road" his first real song. After producing the majority of Carl and the Passions – "So Tough" (1972) and Holland (1973), Carl's leadership role diminished somewhat, due to Brian's brief public reemergence and because of Carl's own substance abuse problems.

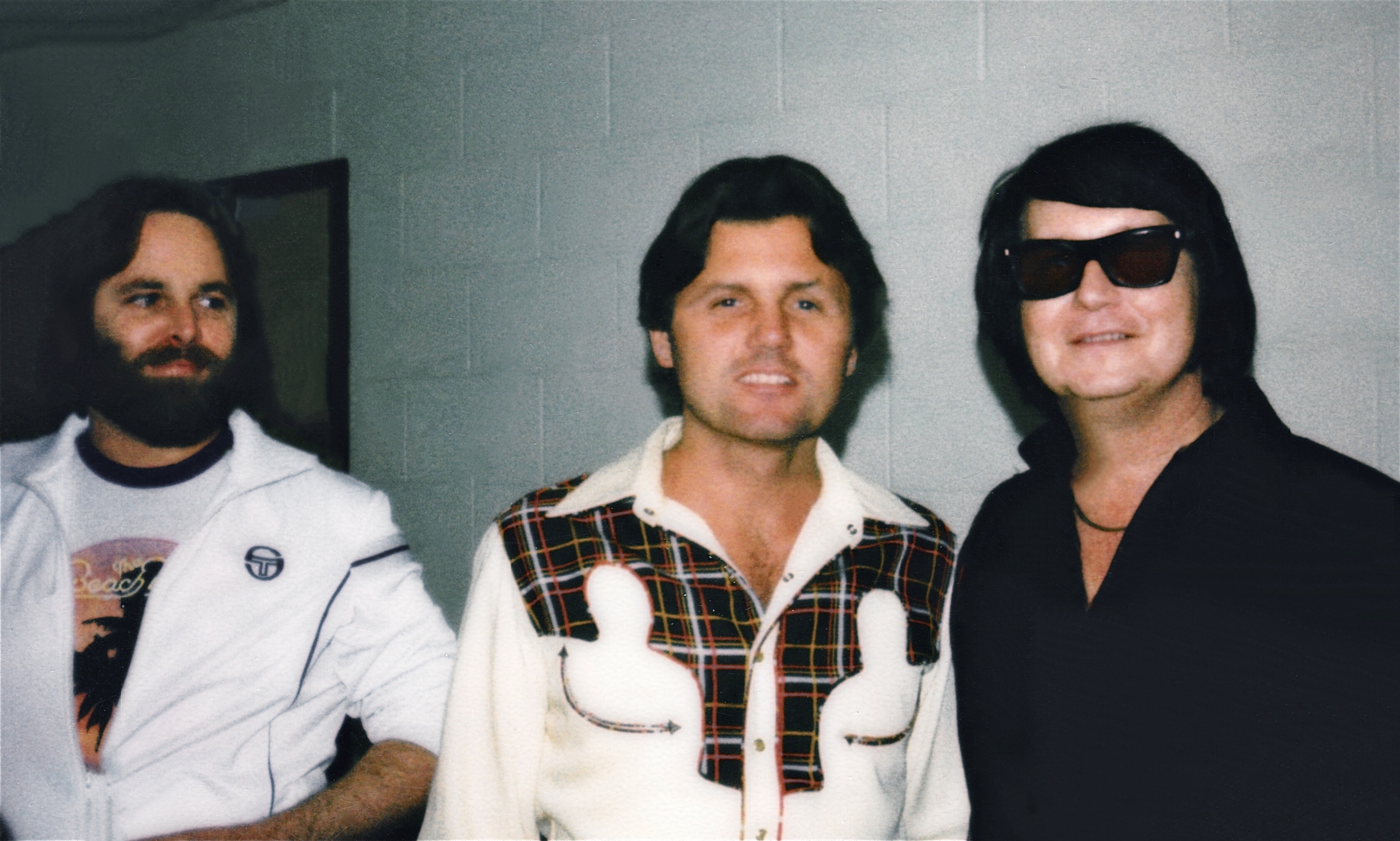
Wilson (left) with Bruce Johnston and Roy Orbison in 1979

For L.A. (Light Album) (1979), Carl contributed four songs, among them "Good Timin'", co-written with Brian five years earlier, which became a Top 40 American hit. Carl's main writing partner in the late 1970s was Geoffrey Cushing-Murray, but for Keepin' the Summer Alive (1980) he wrote with Randy Bachman of the band Bachman-Turner Overdrive. Carl told Michael Feeney Callan, writer-director of the RTÉ 1993 documentary The Beach Boys Today (a celebration of the Beach Boys' 30th anniversary), that Bachman was his favorite writing partner, accordingly: "Basically because he rocked, and I love to rock".

As a producer and vocalist, Carl's work was not confined to the Beach Boys. During the 1970s, he also produced records for other artists, such as Ricci Martin (son of Dean Martin) and South African group the Flames, two members of which later temporarily joined the Beach Boys' line-up. He lent backing vocals to many works, including Chicago's hits "Baby, What a Big Surprise" and "Wishing You Were Here" (with Al Jardine and brother Dennis), Elton John's "Don't Let the Sun Go Down on Me" (with Bruce Johnston), David Lee Roth's hit cover of "California Girls", Warren Zevon's "Desperados Under the Eaves", and the Carnie/Wendy Wilson holiday track "Hey Santa!" Carl also recorded a duet with Olivia Newton-John, titled "You Were Great, How Was I?", for her studio album, "Soul Kiss" (1985). It was not released as a single.

=== Solo career ===
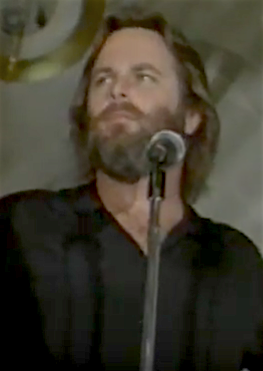
Wilson in 1983

By the early 1980s, the Beach Boys were in disarray; the band had split into camps. Frustrated with the band's sluggishness to record new material and reluctance to rehearse, Wilson took a leave of absence in 1981. He quickly recorded and released a solo album, Carl Wilson, composed largely of rock n' roll songs co-written with Myrna Smith-Schilling, a former backing vocalist for Elvis Presley and Aretha Franklin, and wife of Wilson's then-manager Jerry Schilling. The album briefly charted, and its second single, "Heaven", reached the top 20 on Billboard's Adult Contemporary chart. Wilson also undertook a solo tour to promote the album, becoming the first member of the Beach Boys to break ranks. Initially, Wilson and his band played clubs such as The Bottom Line in New York City and the Roxy in Los Angeles. Thereafter, he joined the Doobie Brothers as the opening act for their 1981 summer tour.

Wilson recorded a second solo album, Youngblood, in a similar vein, but by the time of its release in 1983 he had rejoined the Beach Boys. Although Youngblood did not chart, a single, the John Hall-penned "What You Do To Me", peaked at number 72, making Wilson the second Beach Boy to land a solo single on the Billboard Hot 100. Additionally, the song cracked the top 20 on Billboard's Adult Contemporary chart. Wilson frequently performed that song and "Rockin' All Over the World" (from the same album), as well as "Heaven" from the 1981 album, at Beach Boys' concerts in the 1980s. "Heaven" was always announced as a tribute to brother Dennis, who drowned in December 1983.

=== Later years ===
The Beach Boys' 1985 eponymous album prominently featured Wilson's lead vocals and songwriting, including on recordings such as "It's Gettin' Late" and "Where I Belong". In 1988, the Beach Boys scored their biggest chart success in more than 20 years with the US Number 1 song "Kokomo", co-written by Mike Love, John Phillips, Scott McKenzie, and Terry Melcher, on which Carl sang part of the lead. After this, Love increasingly dominated the band's recorded output and became the driving force behind the album Summer in Paradise (1992), the first and only Beach Boys album with no input from Brian in any form. In 1992, Carl told Michael Feeney Callan his hope was to record new material by Brian. "Speaking for myself", he told Callan, "I only want to record inspired music".

Carl continued recording through the 1990s and participated in the Don Was-led recordings of Brian's "Soul Searchin'" and "You're Still a Mystery", songs conceived as the basis of a canceled Brian Wilson/Beach Boys album. He also recorded the album Like a Brother with Robert Lamm and Gerry Beckley, while continuing to tour with the Beach Boys until the last months of his life.

== Personal life and beliefs ==
After being ordered to report for induction in 1966, Wilson declared himself a conscientious objector and refused the draft to join the American military during the Vietnam War. He was initially acquitted due to draft board irregularities and agreed to do alternative service. Later, he was convicted of draft evasion in 1970 when he failed to do alternative service, and his conviction was upheld on appeal, in part due to the fact that his proposals for alternative service were too vague. By 1988, Wilson had become an ordained minister in the Movement of Spiritual Inner Awareness.

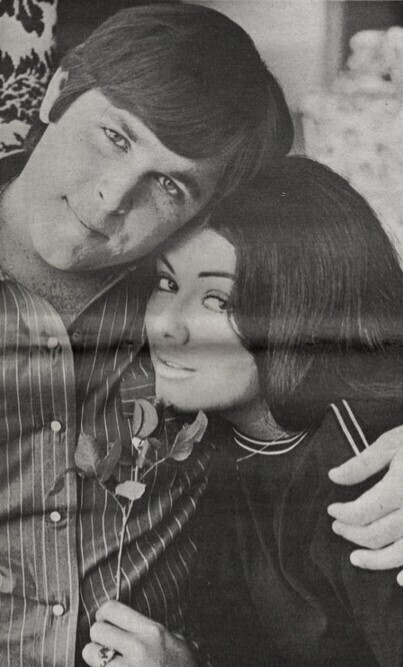
Wilson with first wife Annie Hinsche in 1966.

Wilson was married twice: first to Annie Hinsche, sister of frequent Beach Boys sideman Billy Hinsche, then in 1987 to Dean Martin's daughter Gina (born December 20, 1956). With Annie, he had two sons. It was during the breakup of his and Annie's marriage that Carl wrote "Angel Come Home", which, according to co-writer Geoffrey Cushing-Murray, was about Wilson's grief over separating from his wife due to the Beach Boys' incessant touring. Gina accompanied him during all subsequent tours and the marriage lasted until his death.

Wilson had a Samoyed named Shannon, whose death inspired the emotional 1976 hit song "Shannon" by Henry Gross.

== Death and posthumous releases ==
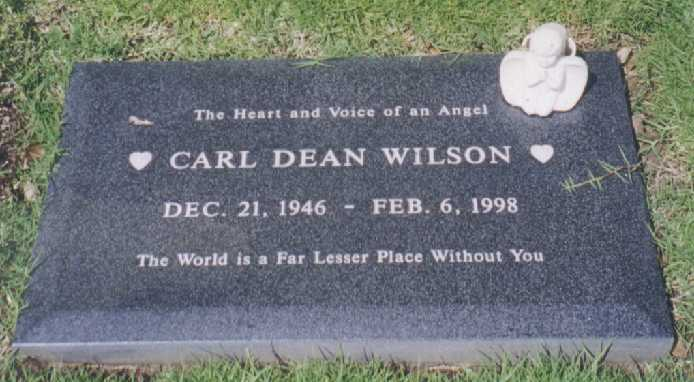
Wilson's headstone over his grave

Wilson became ill at his vacation home in Hawaii in early 1997. He was diagnosed with lung cancer, and was started on chemotherapy. He had been smoking cigarettes since his early teens. Despite his illness and treatments, he continued to play and sing with the Beach Boys throughout their entire summer tour until its completion in the autumn of 1997.

Wilson died of lung cancer in Los Angeles, surrounded by his family, on February 6, 1998. His death occurred just two months after the death of his mother, Audree Wilson. He was interred at Westwood Village Memorial Park Cemetery in Los Angeles.

The Beckley–Lamm–Wilson album, Like a Brother, was released after Wilson's death in 2000. Brian's album Gettin' in Over My Head (2004) features Carl's vocal from the unreleased Beach Boys song "Soul Searchin'", with new backing vocals recorded by Brian. The original Beach Boys version, sourced from a canceled attempt at a new Beach Boys album in late 1995, was eventually released in the Made in California (2013) box set, along with another 1995 track titled "You're Still a Mystery", which features Carl in the vocal blend. In 2010, bandmate Al Jardine released his first solo album, A Postcard From California, which includes a similarly reconstructed track, "Don't Fight The Sea". Carl can also be heard on the continual stream of Beach Boys archival releases, most notably as a central voice in the November 2011 release of The Smile Sessions.

It was announced that Wilson's voice would be on a track from the reunited Beach Boys, on the album That's Why God Made the Radio (2012), but this never materialized. Instead, the scheduled song, "Waves of Love", featured on the 2012 re-release of Jardine's A Postcard from California. During The Beach Boys 50th Anniversary Reunion Tour, a segment of the show was dedicated to the memories of Dennis and Carl. The band harmonized with isolated vocal tracks of Carl performing "God Only Knows" and of Dennis singing "Forever", as the band's crew projected images of the individual Wilson brothers on a large screen behind the band onstage.

== Equipment ==
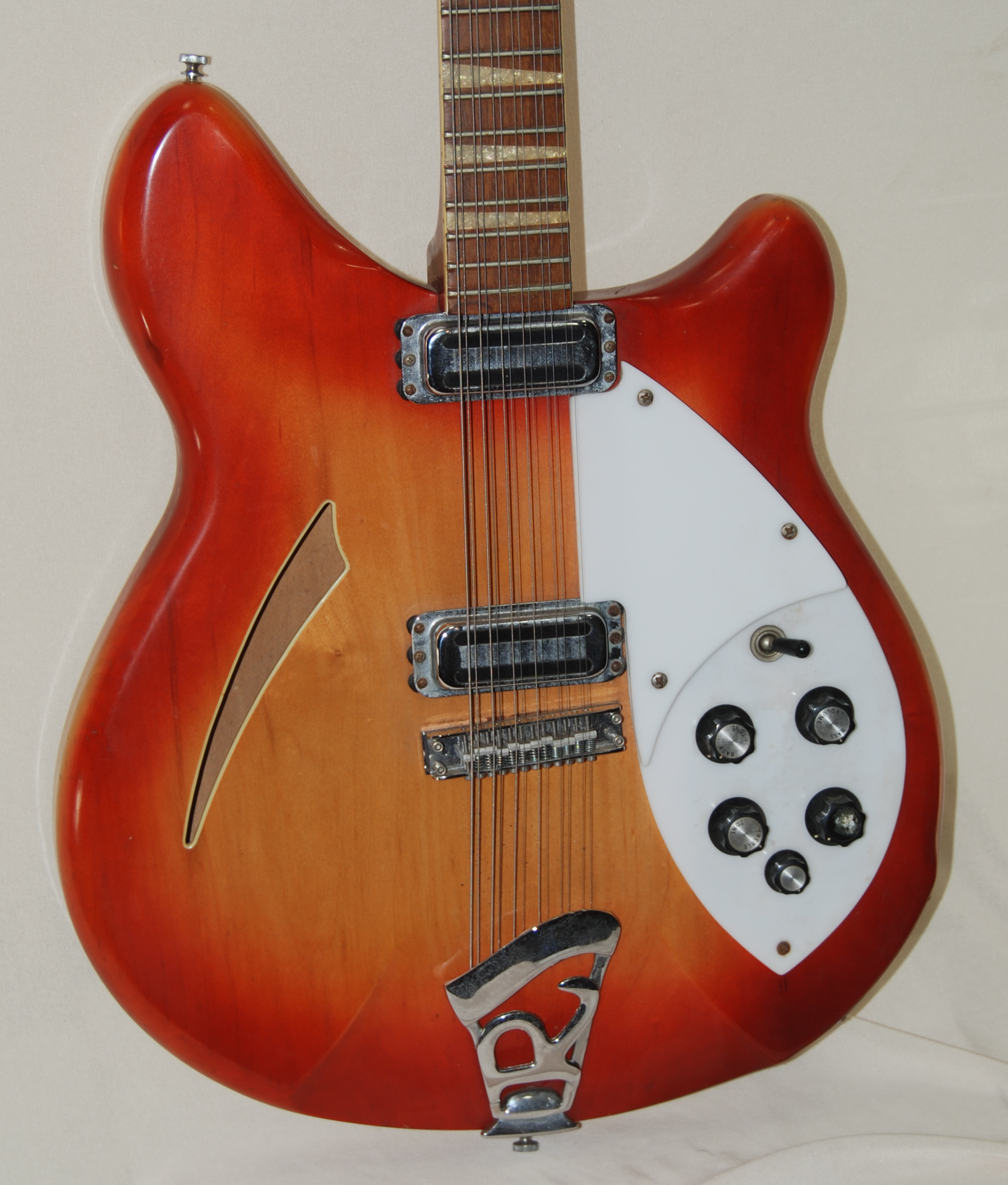
A Rickenbacker 360/12 identical to the 12-string guitar used by Carl in the early to mid-1960s

Information per Jon Stebbins.

Guitars

- Kay single cutaway acoustic – with pickup added
- Fender Stratocaster – Sunburst
- Fender Jaguar – Olympic white
- Rickenbacker 360/12 old style – Fireglo
- Rickenbacker 360/12 new style – Fireglo
- Fender Electric XII – Olympic white
- Guild Starfire VI
- Fender Telecaster – Natural with Bigsby Tremolo
- Gibson ES-335 Custom – Blonde with Bigsby Tremolo
- Fender Stratocaster – Olympic white
- Epiphone Riviera 12-string – Tobacco Sunburst with Gibson neck

Bass

- Hofner copy

Amplifiers

- Fender Dual Showman – blonde with Outboard Spring Reverb Unit
- Fender Dual Showman – black
- Fender Bandmaster
- Fender Bassman
- Fender Twin Reverb

== Discography ==
=== Solo albums ===
Year	Album details	Chart positions
Year	Album details	US
1981	Carl Wilson: Label: Caribou Records	185
1983	Youngblood: Label: Caribou Records	—
2000	Like a Brother (with Gerry Beckley and Robert Lamm): Label: Transparent Music	—
2010	A Postcard from California (with Al Jardine. Wilson appears posthumously, via archival recordings, on two songs): Label: Fontana	—

=== Solo singles ===
Date	Title	Album	Chart positions	
Date	Title	Album	US	AUS
March 1981	"Hold Me" / "Hurry Love"	Carl Wilson	—	-
June 1981	"Heaven" / "Hurry Love"	Carl Wilson	107	-
March 1983	"What You Do To Me" / "Time"	Youngblood	72	98
July 1983	"Givin' You Up" / "It's Too Early to Tell"	Youngblood	—	-
September 2015	"This Is Elvis"	non album song	—	-

=== Songwriting credits ===
- Surfin' U.S.A. (1963)
  - "Surf Jam"
- Shut Down Volume 2 (1964)
  - "Shut Down, Part II"
- All Summer Long (1964)
  - "Carl's Big Chance" (with Brian Wilson)
- The Beach Boys Today! (1965)
  - "Dance, Dance, Dance" (with Brian, Mike Love)
- Wild Honey (1967)
  - "How She Boogalooed It" (with Mike, Bruce Johnston, Al Jardine)
- Friends (1968)
  - "Friends" (with Brian, Dennis Wilson, Jardine)
  - "Be Here in the Mornin'" (with Brian, Dennis, Jardine, Mike)
  - "When a Man Needs a Woman" (with Brian, Dennis, Jardine, Steve Korthof, Jon Parks)
- 20/20 (1969)
  - "I Went to Sleep" (with Brian)
- Sunflower (1970)
  - "It's About Time" (with Dennis, Jardine, Bob Burchman)
  - "Our Sweet Love" (with Brian, Jardine)
- Surf's Up (1971)
  - "Feel Flows" (with Jack Rieley)
  - "Long Promised Road" (with Rieley)
- Carl and the Passions – "So Tough" (1972)
  - "All This Is That" (with Mike, Jardine)
- Holland (1973)
  - "The Trader" (with Rieley)
  - "Leaving This Town" (with Mike, Ricky Fataar, Blondie Chaplin)
- Pacific Ocean Blue (1977)
  - "River Song" (with Dennis)
  - "Rainbows" (with Dennis, Steve Kalinich)
- L.A. (Light Album) (1979)
  - "Good Timin'" (with Brian)
  - "Full Sail" (with Geoffrey Cushing-Murray)
  - "Angel Come Home" (with Cushing-Murray)
  - "Goin' South" (with Cushing-Murray)
- Keepin' the Summer Alive (1980)
  - "Keepin' the Summer Alive" (with Randy Bachman)
  - "Livin' with a Heartache" (with Bachman)
- Carl Wilson (1981)
  - "Hold Me" (with Myrna Smith)
  - "Bright Lights" (with Myrna)
  - "What You Gonna Do About Me?" (with Myrna)
  - "The Right Lane" (with Myrna)
  - "Hurry Love" (with Myrna)
  - "Heaven" (with Myrna, Michael Sun)
  - "The Grammy" (with Myrna)
  - "Seems So Long Ago" (with Myrna)
- Peter Cetera (1981)
  - "I Can Feel It" (with Peter Cetera, Ricky Fataar)
- Youngblood (1983)
  - "What More Can I Say" (with Myrna)
  - "She's Mine" (with Myrna)
  - "Givin' You Up" (with Myrna, Jerry Schilling)
  - "Of the Times" (with Myrna Smith)
  - "Too Early to Tell" (with Myrna Smith, John Daly)
  - "If I Could Talk to Love" (with Myrna Smith)
  - "Time" (with Myrna Smith)
- The Beach Boys (1985)
  - "It's Gettin' Late" (with Myrna, Robert White Johnson)
  - "Maybe I Don't Know" (with Myrna, Steve Levine, Julian Stewart Lindsay)
  - "Where I Belong" (with White Johnson)
- Lost & Found (1961–62) (1991)
  - "Beach Boy Stomp (A.K.A. Karate)"
- Good Vibrations: Thirty Years of The Beach Boys (1993)
  - "Our Team" (with Brian, Dennis, Jardine, Mike)
- Like a Brother (2000)
  - "I Wish For You" (with Robert White Johnson, Phil Galdston)
  - "Run Don't Walk" (with Phil Galdston)
  - "They're Only Words" (with Phil Galdston)
  - "Like A Brother" (with Phil Galdston)
- The Smile Sessions
  - "Tune X"
- I Can Hear Music: The 20/20 Sessions (2018)
  - "Sail Plane Song" (with Brian)
- Feel Flows (album) (2021)
  - "Loop de Loop" (with Brian, Jardine)
- Misc Tracks 1971 (2021)
  - "Telephone Backgrounds (On A Clear Day)"
- 1972 Release (2022)
  - "City Jim"
- 1974 release (2024)
  - "Happy Birthday Roger McGuinn"
- Non-album songs
  - "This Is Elvis" (recorded 1980, released 2015)

== Sources ==
- Stebbins, Jon (2007). The Lost Beach Boy. Virgin Books. ISBN 978-1-85227-391-0.
- Stebbins, Jon (2011). The Beach Boys FAQ: All That's Left to Know About America's Band. Backbeat Books. ISBN 9781458429148.
