= All I Want to Do =

All I Want to Do may refer to:

- All I Want to Do (Sugarland song)
- All I Want to Do (The Beach Boys song)

== See also ==
- All I Wanna Do (disambiguation)
