= Time to Get Alone =

Song by the Beach Boys

from the album 20/20
- Released: February 10, 1969
- Recorded: October 12, 1967 – October 4, 1968
- Studio: Wally Heider and Beach Boys, Los Angeles
- Genre: Baroque pop
- Length: 2:40
- Label: Capitol
- Songwriter: Brian Wilson
- Producers: Carl Wilson, Brian Wilson

Music video
- "Time to Get Alone" on YouTube

"Time to Get Alone" is a song by the American rock band the Beach Boys from their 1969 album 20/20. Written by Brian Wilson and produced by Carl Wilson, it is a baroque pop waltz. Brian originally intended the song for Redwood, the band that evolved into Three Dog Night. It was briefly considered for inclusion on Brian Wilson Presents SMiLE in 2004.

== Recording ==
Brian Wilson originally planned to give the song (along with "Darlin'") to Redwood. The group began recording on October 12, 1967 while in the midst of sessions for the Beach Boys' Wild Honey (1967). Strings and horns overdubs were added on October 14 with drums and percussion on October 15. Danny Hutton recounted:

That’s the only time I really got involved, musically. If you listen to the track, what’s going on is, every time you hit a bop, bop, bop, bop, it’s a different type of keyboard. It’s piano, harpsichord, upright grand, organ. So it has this lopey sound, but I don’t think it was a comfortable sound. And then there’s something that sounds like this big, distorted, smooth guitar sound, and it’s just a little piano played through a blown speaker that I had at my house. Then I remember Brian calling in the string section. [Brian's sister-in-law] Diane Rovell called them in at the last minute, and some of them still had their tuxedos on. Brian was thoroughly in control of those guys. He said, “I’m gonna make you guys feel better. I think some of you guys might have colds.” Then he had everybody open their mouths and Diane or Marilyn [Wilson] sprayed some kind of a cough medicine. I looked at these guys and I thought, “The power! I could never have the power to do that.” And then he was sitting there, talking to me, while they were doing a take, and he stops and says, “Hold it, Danny. Hey, viola! The second chair … you’re flat on that C.’ He not only heard a bad note; he knew which guy did it. Amazing sense.’

After one vocal session, Brian exited the booth and called up his astrologer, who told him that he was on a "down cycle". Brian, who had an aversion to Los Angeles smog, fled the studio and returned the next day with an oxygen tank and mask, taking hits from the tank and sprinting in the alley behind the studio.

The song was finished by the Beach Boys around a year later in 1968 on October 2 and October 4 at Brian Wilson's home studio with the October 4 session being captured on film. Portions of the footage was later used for an "I Can Hear Music" promotional video. The group’s vocals were recorded at these sessions, along with the glockenspiel, and an unused guitar part.

== Reception ==
PopMatters calls the song "a dream, right on down the line from Carl’s feathery lead vocal—and the way it contrasts with the up-and-down crunch of the waltz backdrop—to the sumptuously layered arrangement of the chorus to the immaculate production job to the unadorned coda (which is from the extended version)."

== Personnel ==
Sourced from John Brode, Will Crerar, Joshilyn Hoisington, Craig Slowinski, and 20/20 liner notes.

The Beach Boys

- Al Jardine – lead (chorus) and backing vocals
- Bruce Johnston – backing vocals, vibraphone (low end)
- Mike Love – backing vocals
- Brian Wilson – lead (chorus) and backing vocals, grand pianos, upright piano (with taped strings), harpsichord, snare drum, timpani, vibraphone (high end), glockenspiel; producer
- Carl Wilson – lead (verse and bridge) and backing vocals, tack piano, Baldwin organ; producer

Guests

- Danny Hutton – Wurlitzer electric piano (with busted speaker), sleigh bells
- Diane Rovell – backing vocals
- Marilyn Wilson – backing vocals

Session musicians

- Arnold Belnick – violin
- Harry Bluestone – violin
- Norman Botnick – viola
- Ron Brown – bass guitar
- Dwight Carver – French horns
- Bonnie Douglas – violin
- David Filerman – cello
- Dick Forrest – trumpet
- William Kurasch – violin
- Leonard Malarsky – violin
- Jay Migliori – flute
- Gene Pello – drums
- Joseph Saxon – cello
- Leonard Selic – viola
- Paul Shure – violin

Technical personnel

- Jim Lockert – engineer
- Bill Halverson – 2nd engineer
- Steve Desper – engineer
- Ivan Fisher – engineer

== Cover versions ==
- 1993 – Three Dog Night, Celebrate: The Three Dog Night Story, 1965–1975
