= 20/20 (The Beach Boys album) =

1969 studio album by the Beach Boys

Studio album by the Beach Boys
- Released: February 10, 1969
- Recorded: September 19, 1966 – November 21, 1968
- Studios: Beach Boys (Los Angeles); Capitol; Western; Gold Star; Columbia; ID Sound; Valentine (Hollywood); Bell Sound (New York City)
- Length: 29:46
- Label: Capitol
- Producers: Brian Wilson, Carl Wilson, Bruce Johnston, Dennis Wilson, Alan Jardine

The Beach Boys chronology
| Stack-o-Tracks (1968) | 20/20 (1969) | Live in London (1970) |

Singles from 20/20
- 1. "Bluebirds over the Mountain" / "Never Learn Not to Love" Released: December 2, 1968; 2. "I Can Hear Music" / "All I Want to Do" Released: March 3, 1969

20/20 is the fifteenth studio album by the American rock band the Beach Boys, released February 10, 1969, on Capitol Records. The LP was named for being their 20th overall release when factoring in live albums and compilations. Much of 20/20 consists of outtakes from earlier albums. It reached number 3 on UK record charts and number 68 in the U.S. Brian Wilson was absent during some of the album's recording after admitting himself into a psychiatric hospital - and less active in the group in general - requiring brothers Carl and Dennis to retrieve several outtakes he had recorded years earlier. While Brian does not appear on the front cover, the inner gatefold of the original vinyl release features him alone, behind an eye examination chart.

The singles "Do It Again" and "Bluebirds over the Mountain" preceded the album's release by several months. The former was the band's first attempt at revisiting the surf sound they had abandoned since All Summer Long, topping UK and Australian charts, and the latter contained the B-side "Never Learn Not to Love", based on a song by Charles Manson. The other singles were "I Can Hear Music" and a rerecorded version of "Cotton Fields". In 2018, session highlights, outtakes, and alternate takes were released for the compilation I Can Hear Music: The 20/20 Sessions.

== Background ==
On June 24, 1968, the Beach Boys released the album Friends, which peaked at number 126 and remained on the Billboard Top LPs chart for 10 weeks. It became the group's worst-selling album to date, with record sales in the US estimated at 18,000 units. To recuperate from the album's poor sales, the band quickly released the standalone single "Do It Again". The song was a deliberate throwback to the group's early surf songs, and the first time they had embraced the subject matter since 1964. It reached the US top twenty and became their second number one hit in the UK. Biographer Chrisian Matijas-Mecca wrote that "while this may have been some of Brian's strongest work of the period, it did nothing to reverse the band's decline in popularity."

Brian Wilson said that by early 1968, the group had begun losing thousands of dollars "on stupid things ... cars, houses ... bad investments ... a heck of a lot of corporation money on Brother Records, our own company, and in boosting other artists who just didn't make it, and didn't have a single hit." One of these artists was Ron Wilson (no relation to Brian), who co-wrote "We're Together Again" with him for the Beach Boys, but the group's recording was left unreleased. In turn, Brian produced an ultimately unsuccessful solo single for Ron, a cover of "As Tears Go By", which was released by Columbia Records in September. Another artist that the group worked with was ex-convict Charles Manson, who was then seeking a career as a singer-songwriter. Dennis Wilson befriended Manson and was interested in signing him to Brother Records. Brian and Carl Wilson then co-produced several tracks for Manson at the Beach Boys' private studio located in Brian's home. These recordings remain unheard by the public. (Note: Music historian Andrew Doe stated that the tapes exist, but that they have "not a hope in hell" of being released.)

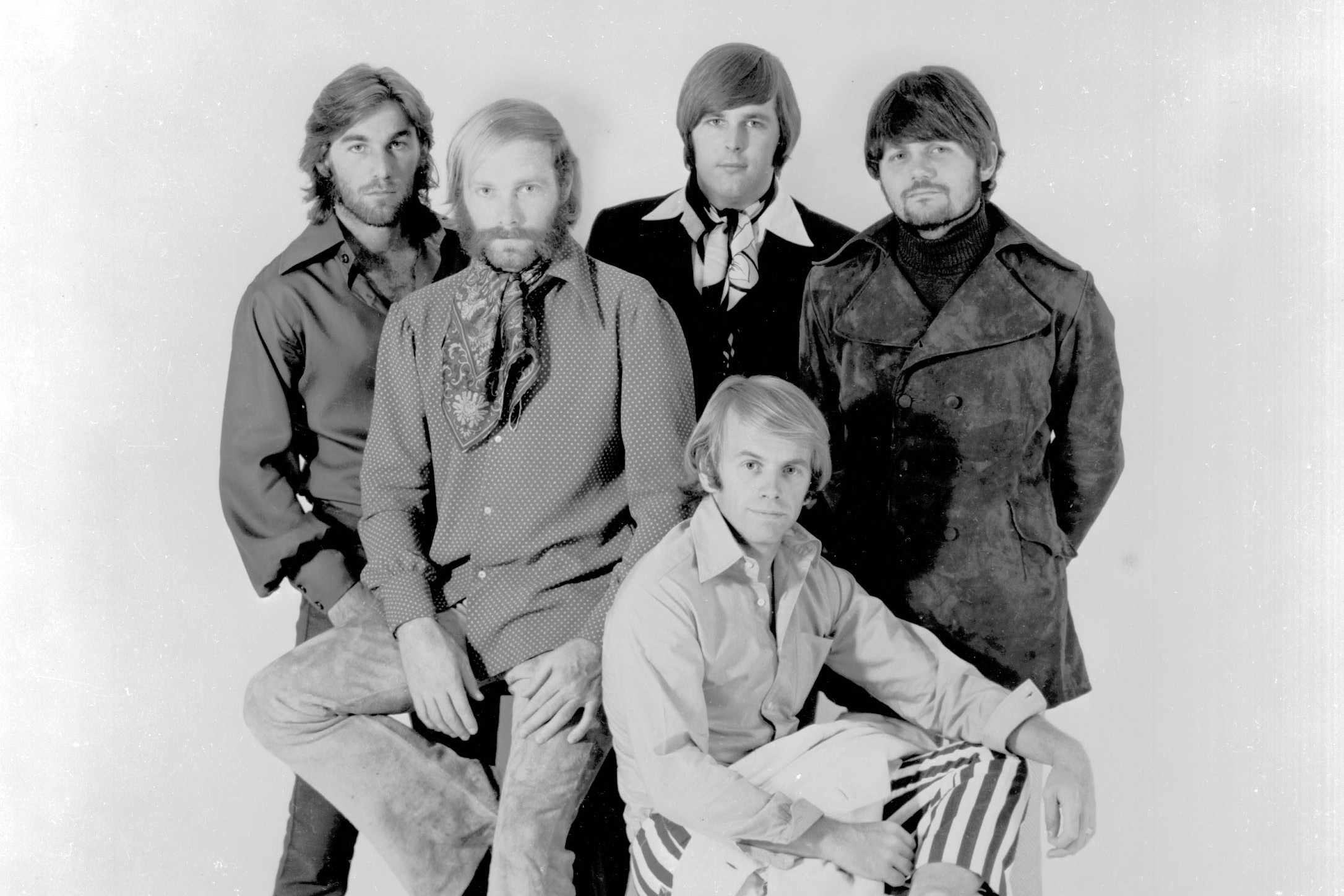
The Beach Boys at a 1968 photoshoot. From left: Dennis Wilson, Mike Love, Carl Wilson (back), Al Jardine (front), and Bruce Johnston. Brian Wilson not pictured.

Over the summer of 1968, Brian attempted to record an arrangement of the 1927 show tune "Ol' Man River". According to music writer Brian Chidester, the session tapes "reveal Wilson conducting the Beach Boys to such extreme perfectionism that both he and the band seem at the end of their rope with one another". Singer Danny Hutton recalled that Brian had expressed suicidal wishes at the time, and that it was when his "real decline started". Afterward, he was admitted to a psychiatric hospital, possibly of his own volition.

Brian's issues were not disclosed to the public, and sessions continued in his absence. Once discharged, Brian rarely finished any tracks for the band, leaving much of his subsequent Beach Boys output for Carl Wilson to complete. Regarding Brian's participation on the group's recordings from then, band engineer Stephen Desper said that Brian remained "indirectly involved with production" through Carl. Dennis said that Brian began to have "no involvement at all", which forced the group to "find things that [he] worked on and try and piece it together." (Note: Brian's former wife Marilyn recalled that Brian withdrew because of perceived resentment from the group: "it was like 'OK you assholes, you think you can do as good as me or whatever – go ahead – you do it. You think it’s so easy? You do it.'" Referencing the accusation that the Beach Boys refused to let Brian work, Dennis said "I would go to his house daily and beg, 'What can I do to help you?' I said, 'Forget recording, forget all of it.' It got to Brian's health.")

== Recording and content ==
=== Older songs ===
According to biographer Keith Badman, the 20/20 sessions marked "the emergence of Carl and Dennis as producers and of Steve Desper as the group's engineer. Desper is now part of the Beach Boys' fold and remains a chief engineer on their work early into the [1970s]."

The two oldest tracks on 20/20 were sourced from late 1966 sessions for the band's unfinished album Smile. "Our Prayer" is a wordless hymn composed by Brian, while "Cabinessence" is a song written by Brian and Van Dyke Parks. Both tracks were given additional vocal overdubs by Carl and Dennis Wilson in November 1968 at Capitol Studios. According to biographer Peter Ames Carlin, Brian was opposed to the inclusion of those tracks and refused the invitation to participate in the overdub sessions. Desper commented that "Cabinessence" was "finished, more or less, with Brian's guidance through Carl."

"Bluebirds over the Mountain" is a cover of the 1958 Ersel Hickey song, produced by Bruce Johnston in September 1967 at Western Studio and completed in October 1968 at Bell Sound. "Time to Get Alone" was written and produced by Brian for the group Redwood (later Three Dog Night) between sessions for the Beach Boys' Wild Honey (1967). It was completed by the Beach Boys in November 1968 at their studio.

=== May – July 1968 sessions ===
"Do It Again", a Brian Wilson and Mike Love collaboration, was the first track that was worked on after concluding the sessions for Friends. It was recorded in May and June 1968, released as a single two weeks later, and ultimately chosen as the opening track for 20/20. Brian later called it the finest song that he wrote on the album. The album mix differs slightly in that it briefly segues into another Smile outtake, "Workshop", which consists of construction noises and sounds from carpentry tools. "I Went to Sleep" is a waltz written by Brian and Carl with a gentle mood and observational lyrics similar to other Brian songs of the period. "The Nearest Faraway Place" is an instrumental produced by Bruce Johnston with the string arrangement by Van McCoy. The title came from a Life magazine article written by Shana Alexander.

Leftover tracks from these initial sessions included "All I Wanna Do", "Well You Know I Knew", "Been Way Too Long" (also known as "Can't Wait Too Long"), "Walk On By", "We're Together Again", "Sail Plane Song" (also known as "Loop de Loop"), "Ol' Man River", "Walkin'", and a demo of "Mona Kana". "Been Way Too Long" is an unfinished song started by Brian in 1967. "Walk On By" is a cover of the 1963 Burt Bacharach/Hal David song, recorded at Brian's studio on the same day as the first "Do It Again" session. "Ol' Man River" was intended to be in medley with the standard "Old Folks at Home". "Walkin'" is a song written and sung by Brian that was worked on for two days in June 1968. Band archivist Mark Linett said "he gets so disgusted singing it that you hear him throw down his headphones and that's the last time anybody ever heard of it." Also recorded, according to band manager Nick Grillo, was "a hundred hours of [Manson's] music at [Brian's home] studio".

=== September – November 1968 sessions ===
For the majority of July and August, the Beach Boys toured the US and appeared on a few television talk shows. Most of the subsequent new material was tracked at Capitol Studios. Carl produced a rendition of the Ronettes' 1966 song "I Can Hear Music" for the group, and it was the first time he was given a sole production credit. Brian said that he also contributed to the recording, explaining "I wanted the instrumental track ... to be smooth and subliminal. I used acoustic guitars. Carl wailed on the lead." Biographer David Leaf called it "the turning point in the transition of musical control in the Beach Boys from Brian to Carl". Brian also produced a version of Huddie Ledbetter's "Cotton Fields" that he later called "one of the best [records] we've ever made". The idea was suggested by bandmate Al Jardine, who thought they might be able to replicate the success of "Sloop John B" (1966).

"Never Learn Not to Love" was originally written by Charles Manson under the title "Cease to Exist". According to Carlin, Manson penned "Cease to Exist" specifically for the Beach Boys to record, and biographer Steven Gaines said that Manson "reportedly" wrote the song to help ease tensions within the group. Dennis produced the Beach Boys' version in September 1968, reworking the song's bluesy structure and altering its lyric (the opening lyric "Cease to exist" modified to "Cease to resist"). The title was also changed to "Never Learn Not to Love", much to Manson's indignation.

Dennis wrote and produced two more songs that appear on the album. "Be with Me" was described by Leaf as "dark and eerie ... perfectly capturing his emotions of the era." "All I Want to Do" is a rocker that features the sounds of Dennis having sexual intercourse with a groupie. Also recorded was Dennis' "A Time to Live in Dreams" (released on 2001's Hawthorne, CA) and "Mona Kana" (released on 2013's Made in California).

== Packaging ==
The cover photo includes every member of the group except Brian, which Matijas-Mecca referred to as "a sign that the group was determined to forge their own identity without their founding architect." A photograph of Brian hiding behind an eye examination chart does appear on the gatefold cover.

== Release and reception ==
Retrospective professional ratings
Review scores
| Source | Rating |
|---|---|
| AllMusic | 4/5 stars |
| Blender (Friends/20/20 reissue) | 4/5 stars |
| Encyclopedia of Popular Music | 3/5 stars |
| MusicHound | 3/5 |
| The Rolling Stone Album Guide | 4/5 stars |
| Sputnikmusic | 3.5/5 stars |

Lead single "Bluebirds over the Mountain" (backed with "Never Learn Not to Love") was issued on November 29, 1968, in the UK (number 33) and three days later in the U.S. (number 61), becoming the group's lowest-charting single since their 1961 debut "Surfin'". After touring the UK in December, the Beach Boys returned to the studio to work on the album that would become Sunflower (1970).

Released on February 10, 1969, 20/20 sold better than Friends, peaking at number 3 in the UK and reaching number 68 in the US. Rolling Stone reviewer Arthur Schmidt said the album was "good, [but] flawed mainly by a lack of direction (a sense of direction being last evident in Wild Honey), more a collection than a whole." An uncredited writer from Hit Parader opined that it was the band's best album since Pet Sounds and an improvement over the "baffling" Friends and Wild Honey. A reviewer for the underground paper Rat Subterranean News commented that even though it was "against all my carefully established principles to like The Beach Boys," he enjoyed the LP, yet described most of side one as "weak".

In August, Charles Manson and his cult of followers committed the Tate–LaBianca murders, and three months later, were apprehended by police. Their former connections with Dennis and the Beach Boys became the subject of media attention. Manson was later convicted for several counts of murder and conspiracy to murder. During the trial, Manson released his debut album, Lie: The Love and Terror Cult, which included his original arrangement of "Cease to Exist".

[20/20 was] the only letdown of the Beach Boys' career that embarrassed me through and through ... it was the first album the group made that was completely disjointed.

— Dennis Wilson, 1976

Among retrospective assessments of 20/20, critic Richie Unterberger wrote that it was "one of their better post-Pet Sounds records ... The highlights, however, were a couple of Smile-session-era tunes ... as hard as they were trying to establish their identity as an integrated band in the late '60s, their new recordings were overshadowed by the bits and pieces of Smile that emerged at the time." Biographer David Leaf called it "one of the most artistically interesting releases of their career and certainly one of the stronger later LPs." Peter Ames Carlin wrote that "whatever the album lacked in thematic coherence, it made up in the quality of the pieces contributed by each band member." Brooklyn Vegan's Andrew Sacher said that the first side is "uneven and often disappointing", yet side two is "almost flawless".

== Track listing ==
Producer credits are as noted on the original vinyl disc. Brian Wilson's production credit for "Time to Get Alone" was uncredited, while Charles Manson's contributions to "Never Learn Not to Love" remain uncredited.

=== Original vinyl ===
Side one
| No. | Title | Writer(s) | Lead vocal(s) | Length |
|---|---|---|---|---|
| 1. | "Do It Again" (produced by B. Wilson and C. Wilson) | Brian Wilson, Mike Love | Mike Love and Brian Wilson | 2:25 |
| 2. | "I Can Hear Music" (produced by C. Wilson) | Jeff Barry, Ellie Greenwich, Phil Spector | Carl Wilson | 2:36 |
| 3. | "Bluebirds over the Mountain" (produced by Johnston and C. Wilson) | Ersel Hickey | Love with Bruce Johnston | 2:51 |
| 4. | "Be with Me" (produced by D. Wilson) | Dennis Wilson | Dennis Wilson | 3:08 |
| 5. | "All I Want to Do" (produced by D. Wilson) | D. Wilson, Stephen Kalinich | Love | 2:02 |
| 6. | "The Nearest Faraway Place" (produced by Johnston) | Bruce Johnston | instrumental | 2:39 |

Side two
| No. | Title | Writer(s) | Lead vocal(s) | Length |
|---|---|---|---|---|
| 1. | "Cotton Fields" (produced by B. Wilson and Jardine) | Huddie Ledbetter | Al Jardine | 2:21 |
| 2. | "I Went to Sleep" (produced by B. Wilson) | B. Wilson, Carl Wilson | group | 1:36 |
| 3. | "Time to Get Alone" (produced by C. Wilson) | B. Wilson | C. Wilson with B. Wilson and Jardine | 2:40 |
| 4. | "Never Learn Not to Love" (produced by D. Wilson and C. Wilson) | D. Wilson, Charles Manson | D. Wilson | 2:31 |
| 5. | "Our Prayer" (produced by B. Wilson) | B. Wilson | group | 1:07 |
| 6. | "Cabinessence" (produced by B. Wilson) | B. Wilson, Van Dyke Parks | C. Wilson and Love with D. Wilson | 3:34 |
| Total length: | | | | 29:46 |

=== Friends / 20/20 1990/2001 CD reissue bonus tracks ===
| No. | Title | Writer(s) | Lead vocal(s) | Length |
|---|---|---|---|---|
| 13. | "Break Away" | B. Wilson, Murry Wilson | C. Wilson, Jardine with B. Wilson | 2:57 |
| 14. | "Celebrate the News" | D. Wilson, Gregg Jakobson | D. Wilson | 3:05 |
| 15. | "We're Together Again" | Ron Wilson | B. Wilson | 1:49 |
| 16. | "Walk On By" | Burt Bacharach, Hal David | B. Wilson with D. Wilson | 0:55 |
| 17. | "Old Folks at Home/Ol' Man River" | Stephen Foster, Jerome Kern, Oscar Hammerstein II | B. Wilson with Love | 2:52 |

=== I Can Hear Music ===
I Can Hear Music: The 20/20 Sessions

Compilation album by the Beach Boys
- Released: December 7, 2018
- Recorded: 1968
- Label: Capitol
- Producers: The Beach Boys (original recordings); Mark Linett; Alan Boyd
- Compilers: Mark Linett; Alan Boyd

The Beach Boys chronology
| Wake the World: The Friends Sessions (2018) | I Can Hear Music: The 20/20 Sessions (2018) | The Beach Boys On Tour: 1968 (2018) |

Professional ratings
Review scores
| Source | Rating |
|---|---|
| AllMusic | 3.5/5 stars |
| Rolling Stone | 3.5/5 stars |

On December 7, 2018, Capitol released I Can Hear Music: The 20/20 Sessions, a digital-only compilation. Included are session highlights, outtakes, and alternate versions of 20/20 tracks, as well as some unreleased material by Dennis Wilson. It was released in conjunction with Wake the World: The Friends Sessions. The compilations were not issued on physical media due to the project being greenlit too late into the year, as well as the record company's wish not to interfere with the release of The Beach Boys with the Royal Philharmonic Orchestra. In 2021, I Can Hear Music was followed with Feel Flows: The Sunflower and Surf's Up Sessions.

| No. | Title | Writer(s) | Length |
|---|---|---|---|
| 1. | "Do It Again" (alternate stereo mix) | Brian Wilson; Mike Love | 2:46 |
| 2. | "Do It Again" (a cappella) | B.Wilson; Love | 2:30 |
| 3. | "I Can Hear Music" (demo) | Jeff Barry; Ellie Greenwich; Phil Spector | 1:00 |
| 4. | "I Can Hear Music" (track and backing vocals) | Barry; Greenwich; Spector | 2:42 |
| 5. | "Bluebirds over the Mountain" (alternate mix) | Ersel Hickey | 2:56 |
| 6. | "Be with Me" (demo) | Dennis Wilson | 2:45 |
| 7. | "Be with Me" (2018 track mix) | D. Wilson | 3:17 |
| 8. | "All I Want to Do" (Dennis Wilson lead vocal take 2) | D. Wilson | 2:13 |
| 9. | "The Nearest Faraway Place" (alternate version) | Bruce Johnston | 2:13 |
| 10. | "Cotton Fields" (track and backing vocals) | Lead Belly | 2:25 |
| 11. | "I Went to Sleep" (a cappella 2018 mix) | B. Wilson; Carl Wilson | 1:35 |
| 12. | "Time to Get Alone" (a cappella) | B. Wilson | 3:36 |
| 13. | "Never Learn Not to Love" (track and backing vocals) | D. Wilson | 2:25 |
| 14. | "Never Learn Not to Love" (a cappella) | D. Wilson | 2:23 |
| 15. | "Walk On By" (2018 mix) | Burt Bacharach; Hal David | 1:55 |
| 16. | "Rendezvous" (Do It Again early version) (2018 mix) | B. Wilson; Love | 2:36 |
| 17. | "We’re Together Again" (a cappella) | B. Wilson; Ron Wilson | 2:01 |
| 18. | "I Can Hear Music" (alternate lead vocal) | Barry; Greenwich; Spector | 2:11 |
| 19. | "All I Wanna Do" (early version track) | B.Wilson; Love | 2:24 |
| 20. | "Sail Plane Song" (2018 mix) | B. Wilson; C. Wilson | 2:19 |
| 21. | "Old Man River" (a cappella 2018 mix) | Stephen Foster; Jerome Kern; Oscar Hammerstein II | 1:18 |
| 22. | "Medley: Old Folks at Home/Old Man River" (alternate version) | Foster; Kern; Hammerstein | 2:57 |
| 23. | "Medley: Old Folks at Home/Old Man River" (alternate version track) | Foster; Kern; Hammerstein | 2:59 |
| 24. | "Walkin'" | B. Wilson; Jardine | 2:48 |
| 25. | "Been Way Too Long" (sections) | B. Wilson | 7:56 |
| 26. | "Well You Know I Knew" | D. Wilson | 1:42 |
| 27. | "Love Affair" (demo) | D. Wilson | 2:00 |
| 28. | "Peaches" (demo) | D. Wilson | 2:26 |
| 29. | "The Gong" (session highlights) | D. Wilson | 5:29 |
| 30. | "A Time to Live in Dreams" (2018 mix) | D. Wilson; Stephen Kalinich | 1:54 |
| 31. | "All I Want to Do" (early version) | D. Wilson | 1:12 |
| 32. | "All I Want to Do" (Dennis Wilson lead vocal take 1) | D. Wilson | 2:10 |
| 33. | "Bluebirds over the Mountain" (basic track) | Hickey | 1:48 |
| 34. | "Bluebirds over the Mountain" (mono single mix) | Hickey | 2:51 |
| 35. | "Mona Kana" (demo) | D. Wilson | 1:16 |
| 36. | "Mona Kana" (2018 mix) | D. Wilson; Stephen Kalinich | 3:03 |
| 37. | "We’re Together Again" (remake track with backing vocals) | B. Wilson; R. Wilson | 1:58 |
| 38. | "Time to Get Alone" (remake track) | B. Wilson | 2:46 |
| 39. | "Oh Yeah" | unknown | 0:54 |
| 40. | "Is It True What They Say About Dixie?" (lead vocals by Audree Wilson) | Irving Caesar; Sammy Lerner; Gerald Marks | 1:47 |

== Personnel ==
Per John Brode, Will Crerar, Joshilyn Hoisington, Craig Slowinski, and 20/20 liner notes.

The Beach Boys

- Al Jardine – vocals, acoustic guitar, electric rhythm guitar, banjo, handclaps; producer
- Bruce Johnston – vocals, Hammond organ, handclaps, piano, Fender Rhodes, bass guitar; vibraphone; producer
- Mike Love – vocals, handclaps
- Brian Wilson – vocals, grand piano, upright piano (with taped strings), organ, Chamberlin, harpsichord, Fender Rhodes, snare drum, timpani, vibraphone, glockenspiel, handclaps; producer
- Carl Wilson – vocals, acoustic guitar, electric guitar, tack piano, organ, bass guitar, handclaps, congas; tambourine (uncertain credit); producer
- Dennis Wilson – vocals, drums, handclaps, piano, vibraphone; producer

Touring musicians

- Ed Carter – guitar, bass guitar
- Daryl Dragon – marimba
- Mike Kowalski – congas, sleigh bells, snare drum

Guests

- Marilyn Wilson – backing vocals on "Time to Get Alone"
- Diane Rovell – backing vocals on "Time to Get Alone"
- Van Dyke Parks – upright piano on "Cabinessence"
- Danny Hutton – Wurlitzer electric piano and sleigh bells on "Time to Get Alone"

Additional session musicians

- Arnold Belnick – violin
- Chuck Berghofer – upright bass
- Hal Blaine – drums
- Harry Bluestone – violin
- Samuel Boghossian – viola
- Jimmy Bond – upright bass
- Norman Botnick – viola
- Ron Brown – bass guitar
- David Burk – viola
- James Burton – dobro
- Dwight Carver – French horns
- Roy Caton – trumpet
- Pete Christlieb – tenor saxophone
- Alf Clausen – French horn
- Jack Coan – cornet
- David Cohen – guitar
- Bonnie Douglas – violin
- Jesse Ehrlich – cello
- Alan Estes – percussion
- Virgil Evans – trumpet
- David Filerman – cello
- Dick Forrest – trumpet
- Carl Fortina – accordion
- Jim Gordon – drums, timbales, tambourine with a stick, "bell goodies"
- John Guerin – drums, woodblock, tambourine, sleigh bells
- Igor Horoshevsky – cello
- Artie Kaplan – tenor saxophone
- Armond Kaproff – cello
- Carol Kaye – bass guitar, banjo
- Raymond Kelley – cello
- Larry Knechtel – bass guitar
- Fred Koyan – trumpet
- William Kurasch – violin
- Willie Maiden – baritone saxophone
- Leonard Malarsky – violin
- Dick McQuary – baritone saxophone
- Jay Migliori – flute
- Oliver Mitchell – trumpet
- Tommy Morgan – harmonica, bass harmonica
- Roger Neumann – piccolo, flute, fife, tenor saxophone
- John Lowe – bass saxophone
- Glenn Lutz – trumpet
- Don Peake – guitar, electric bass, percussion
- Gene Pello – drums
- Bill Peterson – trumpet
- Bill Pitman – Danelectro fuzz bass
- Mike Price – trumpet
- Don Randi – piano, organ
- Joe Randozzo – bass trombone
- Lyle Ritz – upright bass
- Frank De La Rosa – upright bass
- Joseph Saxon – cello
- Leonard Selic – viola
- Paul Shure – violin
- Ernie Small – flute, bass saxophone
- Wally Snow – vibraphone
- Spiro Stamos – violin
- Darrel Terwillger – violin
- Tommy Tedesco – acoustic guitar, bouzouki
- Al Vescovo – dobro
- John de Voogt – violin

Technical personnel

- Steve Desper – engineer
- Jim Lockert – engineer
- Ed Simpson – photos

== Charts ==
| Chart | Position |
|---|---|
| Dutch Album Chart | 20 |
| German Albums (Offizielle Top 100) | 23 |
| UK Top 40 Albums | 3 |
| US Billboard 200 | 68 |
