= All I Wanna Do =

All I Wanna Do may refer to:

== Film ==
- All I Wanna Do (1998 film) or The Hairy Bird, a Canadian/American teen comedy
- All I Wanna Do (2011 film), a Moroccan documentary

== Music ==
- "All I Wanna Do" (The Beach Boys song), 1970
- "All I Wanna Do", a song by Christina Aguilera and Keizo Nakanishi, 1997
- "All I Wanna Do" (Dannii Minogue song), originally released in 1997 and reworked in 2020
- "All I Wanna Do" (Jo Jo Zep & The Falcons song), 1980
- "All I Wanna Do" (Sheryl Crow song), 1994
- "All I Wanna Do" (Martin Jensen song), 2016
- "All I Wanna Do", a song by Davidson from the album Grand Theft Auto 2 soundtrack
- "All I Wanna Do", a song by Jetrin Wattanasin from the album Choola-Choola, 1995
- "All I Wanna Do", a song by Full Force
- "All I Wanna Do", a song by Jay Park (featuring Hoody and Loco) from the album Everything You Wanted
- "All I Wanna Do", a song by Splashh from the album Comfort
- "All I Wanna Do", a song by DEV from the album I Only See You When I'm Dreamin'
- "All I Wanna Do Is Make Love to You" or "All I Wanna Do", a 1990 song by Heart from the album Brigade
- All I Wanna Do (EP), a 2014 EP by T. Mills, or the title song

== See also ==
- "All I Want to Do" (Sugarland song), 2008
- "All I Want to Do" (The Beach Boys song), 1969
- "All I Really Want to Do", a song by Bob Dylan, also covered by the Byrds and by Cher
- All I Really Want to Do (album), a 1965 album by Cher
