= Stephen Kalinich =

American poet (born 1942)

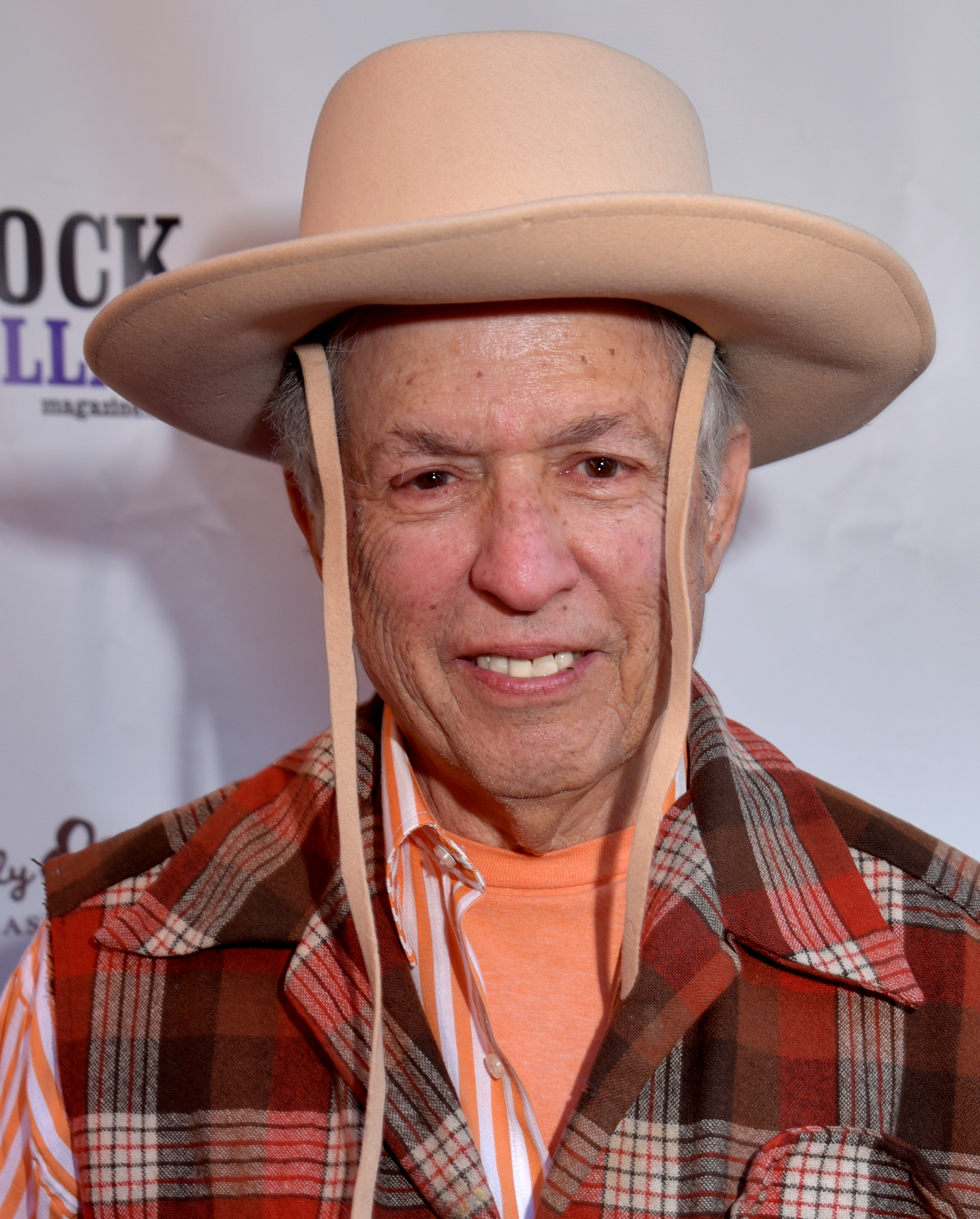
- Kalinich in 2019
- Born: January 18, 1942 (age 84)
- Occupation: Poet
- Years active: 1960s–present

Stephen John "Stevie" Kalinich (/kəˈlɪnɪtʃ/ kə-LIN-itch; born 1942) is an American poet, songwriter, and actor. He is mostly known for his songwriting collaborations with Brian and Dennis Wilson of the Beach Boys. In 1969, he recorded his only album, A World of Peace Must Come, with production by Brian Wilson. It was unreleased until 2008.

== Biography ==
Kalinich was born in Endicott, New York. His parents were divorced, his father being a professional golfer. Kalinich grew up with his mother, and he described her as being supportive of his artistic ambitions. In his youth, Kalinich performed in front of guests at his grandparents' house and wrote, but didn't think of a career in the arts yet.

Kalinich decided to move to Los Angeles in 1965. He transferred from Syracuse University's Harpur College (now Binghamton University) to UCLA. At Syracuse, he was friends with singer-songwriter Felix Cavaliere, and they both were in the Sigma Phi Epsilon fraternity. Arriving in Los Angeles (originally to study medicine there), Kalinich noticed "it was like living in a dream, but right next to the wealth was utter poverty. There were many homeless people on the streets, even back then." Shortly after, Kalinich dropped out of college when he got a "break" with his artistic career. Even though he was writing, his main interest was performing.

Immersing himself in the anti-war movement, he began working the LA scene as a poet and performer, appearing at venues such as The Troubadour (Los Angeles). At an early age, he began writing poems and articles about World Peace. He has said, "Very early I wanted to be an influence for peace and good in the world."

The track Leaves of Grass, co-written with Kalinich's early collaborator Mark Buckingham, was recorded in 1966. Radio stations would not play it, wrongly assuming it was about marijuana. At the time, Kalinich was studying and working at a gas station. As the hippie movement snowballed, the Doors and Love were exposing the dark underbelly of the 1960s dream. Kalinich's poetry rests on that pivot point.

Through Jay Ward, Kalinich met Brian Wilson and was signed as a writer, contributing the lyrics to the songs "Be Still" and "Little Bird" to the album "Friends" by The Beach Boys. In a 2020 interview, Kalinich recalls first listening to the recording of "Little Bird" "on an LA side walk through a payphone".

In 2022, Kalinich acted in the award winning independent film, "Emily Or Oscar."

== Poetry ==
Kalinich's works include:

- America
- America, I Know You
- A World of Peace Must Come
- Be Still
- Bring in the Poets
- Candy Face Lane
- If You Knew
- You Are the Trigger

He is also a spoken word performer often backed by original music. Titles include:

- The Magic Hand
- Galactic Symphonies

== Music collaborations ==
While under contract as an artist signed to the Beach Boys' Brother Records, Kalinich co-wrote several songs released by the group including "All I Want to Do", "Be Still", "Little Bird", and "A Time to Live in Dreams" with Dennis Wilson.

Kalinich is the lyricist and co-publisher for Brian Wilson's duet with Paul McCartney "A Friend Like You", on Wilson's 2004 solo album release, Gettin' In Over My Head.

Kalinich also has collaborated with a number of recording artists, performers, musicians, and composers including P.F. Sloan, Art Munson, Ken Hirsch, Randy Crawford, Mary Wilson of the Supremes, Fernando Perdomo, Odyssey, Clifton Davis, Chris M. Allport, David Courtney, and Diana Ross.

Kalinich is Poet for The Tribe, a revolving group of Los Angeles musicians and singers that includes Freebo, Fuzzbee Morse, Gary Stockdale, Grant Geissman, Carly Smithson, Rosemary Butler, Marc Mann, Gary Griffin, The Honeys, and Band Manager Lauri Reimer.

== Tribute albums ==
In 2016, Al Gomes conceived and co-produced, along with his partner Connie Watrous and Grammy Award-winning Beach Boys producer, archivist and historian Alan Boyd, a spoken word tribute CD called The Works of Stephen J. Kalinich – Be Still. The collection included performances of Kalinich's poetry by Beach Boys founder Brian Wilson; actors Stacy Keach, James Michael Tyler, Ralph Brown, Jenny Jules, Rose Weaver, and Samaire Armstrong; Grammy Award nominee Lisa Haley; author and musician Tracy Landecker; along with Gomes, Watrous, and Boyd. The Recording Academy placed the album on its Official 58th Annual Grammy Awards Ballot for Best Spoken Word Album. Gomes said, "This has turned out to be one of the best projects I've ever worked on. What an incredible gathering of talent. This album is a passionate meditation on the journey of life, and also on how poetry and art affect that journey, both from the author's and the receiver of the art's point of view. Thanks to all who gave of themselves—the artists, engineers, and studios—and to all those who listen." Watrous added, "It aligned with the stars so quickly and everyone involved came into it with a beautiful spirit and worked so hard to make it happen with the purest of hearts."

In 2020, Al Gomes and Connie Watrous were tasked with the mission of re-releasing the musical tribute compilation to Kalinich called "California Feeling: The Songs of Stephen Kalinich and Friends" as a four-volume set. Gomes and Watrous oversaw everything from the song sequences, the artwork, and the full worldwide release.

"California Feeling" features Beach Boys classics performed by Beach Boys founding members Brian, Dennis and Carl Wilson's children, family members, touring members, longtime friends, and more, and each of the four volumes tells a unique story.

Artists on the collection include Beach Boy David Marks, Grammy Award Nominees Carnie Wilson and Wendy Wilson (Wilson Phillips), The Supremes founding member Mary Wilson, Neil Innes (Monty Python, The Rutles), Stax Records session guitarist, songwriter, and producer Steve Cropper, The Smithereens member Dennis Diken, pop singer Evie Sands, singer-songwriter P.F. Sloan, Alan Boyd, Brian Wilson's touring musical director Probyn Gregory, and Grammy Award Nominee, producer, and songwriter David Courtney.

Journalist and music critic Brent Wootten (Salon) chose the compilation as one of his 'Top 20 Albums of 2020': "I was delighted that so many of my favorites artists treated us to their best work in years (Lucinda Williams, Rufus Wainwright, Bob Dylan, Paul McCartney, The Flaming Lips, Shelby Lynne, Jeff Tweedy, and Fleet Foxes), while California Feeling: The Songs of Stephen Kalinich and Friends Volume One—a tribute to the poet and Beach Boys collaborator—offers contemporary takes on the classic California sound."
