= Our Prayer =

1969 hymn by the Beach Boys

Hymn by the Beach Boys

from the album 20/20
- Released: February 10, 1969
- Recorded: September 19, 1966 – November 17, 1968
- Studio: Columbia and Capitol, Hollywood
- Genre: Hymn
- Length: 1:07
- Label: Capitol
- Composer(s): Brian Wilson
- Producer(s): The Beach Boys

Licensed audio
- "Our Prayer" on YouTube

"Our Prayer" is a wordless hymn by the American rock band the Beach Boys from their 1969 album 20/20 and their never-finished Smile project. Composed by Brian Wilson, it was originally planned to be the introductory track on Smile. He later rerecorded the piece for his 2004 version of Smile in medley with the 1953 doo-wop standard "Gee".

== Background and recording ==
I was sitting at my piano thinkin' about holy music. I poked around for some simple but moving chords. Later I sat down and wrote 'Our Prayer' in sections. ... I was definitely into rock church music.

—Brian Wilson, writing in the liner notes of the 1990 reissue of Friends and 20/20

"Our Prayer" is a wordless, a cappella piece that Wilson originally composed for the band's Smile album. The title may be a reference to the 1939 traditional pop standard "My Prayer". It was originally simply titled "Prayer".

"Prayer" was tracked during the Smile sessions on September 19 and October 4, 1966, at Columbia Studio. Wilson later wrote, "The boys were overtaken by the arrangement. I taught it to them in sections, the way I usually do." On the session tape, Wilson announces, "This is intro to the album, take one." Al Jardine is heard remarking to Wilson that the piece could be considered its own track, but Wilson rejects the suggestion. This information makes "Prayer" the only part of Smile that is known to have had a definitive placement on the album. At another point in the session, Wilson asks for a hash joint and remarks, "Do you guys feel any acid yet?"

After Smile was scrapped, the track was revisited for inclusion on the 1969 album 20/20 and renamed "Our Prayer". Additional vocals were overdubbed onto the original recording by Carl Wilson, Dennis Wilson, and Bruce Johnston on November 17, 1968, at Capitol Studios.

== Composition ==
Music journalist Paul Williams wrote,

It's a wonderful wordless beginning for a record that for the most part uses words the same way it uses strings and keyboards—for their sounds. This is in sharp contrast to Pet Sounds where most of the songs have titles and lyrics that evoke specific situations and feelings. Smile's radicalism begins with and centers around the fact that it is abstract, whereas all previous Beach Boys records and most rock-and-roll songs are concrete in their imagery. They have words, and those words generally tell a story.

Musicologists John Covach and Graeme M. Boone wrote: "An exquisite exercise of harmonic virtuousity, 'Our Prayer' allowed the Beach Boys once again to show off their vocal abilities and stylistic influences earlier demonstrated on such songs as 'Their Hearts Were Full of Spring'." Philip Lambert described the piece as "every technique of chromatic harmony [Wilson] had ever heard or imagined."

== Personnel ==
Per band archivist Craig Slowinski.

The Beach Boys

- Al Jardine, Bruce Johnston, Mike Love, Brian Wilson, Carl Wilson, Dennis Wilson – vocals

== Cover versions ==
- 2001 – "An All-Star Tribute to Brian Wilson"
- 2011 – Salyu, s(o)un(d)beams+ (as "Our Prayer ~ Heroes and Villains")

== Samples ==
- 2013 – Odesza, "Keep Her Close", My Friends Never Die

== In popular culture ==
- The opening track "Mic Check" from Cornelius' 1997 album Fantasma is a reference to "Our Prayer".
- The song plays over the credits of the third episode of Our Flag Means Death.

== See also ==
- "My Prayer"
