= A World of Peace Must Come =

Studio album by Stephen John Kalinich
- Released: October 6, 2008
- Recorded: August–September 1969 (except "Leaves of Grass", recorded in 1965/66)
- Genre: Spoken word
- Label: Light in the Attic
- Producer: Brian Wilson; Stephen John Kalinich

Stephen John Kalinich chronology
A World of Peace Must Come (2008)	Galactic Symphonies (2008)

A World of Peace Must Come is the debut album by American poet Stephen Kalinich. It was produced by Brian Wilson in August and September 1969. The album's release was delayed for several decades before being issued by Light in the Attic Records on October 6, 2008.

== Background ==
The album is a collaboration between Brian Wilson and poet Stephen Kalinich dating from August and September 1969. It contains spoken word passages by Kalinich recorded in Brian's Los Angeles bedroom on August 22, 1969 with some instrumental accompaniment tracked later at Wally Heider Recording in Hollywood. In 1974, its recordings were assembled, but a record deal could not be found for it. It was finally given an official release on October 6, 2008.

== Track listing ==
All lyrics are written by Stephen John Kalinich.

No.	Title	Music	Length
1.	"A World of Peace Must Come (intro)"		0:12
2.	"Candy Face Lane"		3:31
3.	"I Am Waiting/The Birth of God"		2:59
4.	"The Deer, The Elk, The Raven"	Stephen John Kalinich	2:39
5.	"The Magic Hand"	Brian Wilson	3:22
6.	"Lonely Man"	Kalinich	2:37
7.	"Be Still"	Dennis Wilson	4:26
8.	"Walk Along with Love"	Kalinich	2:07
9.	"A World of Peace Must Come"	Kalinich	2:33
10.	"If You Knew"	B. Wilson	2:55
11.	"America, I Know You"	B. Wilson	4:08
12.	"A World of Peace Must Come (outro)"		0:15
13.	"Leaves of Grass" (bonus track)	Mark Buckingham	2:44

Note

- "The Magic Hand" contains an excerpt of "Tears on My Pillow", sung by Marilyn Wilson and friends.

== Personnel ==
- Stephen John Kalinich – vocals, guitar on "The Deer, The Elk, The Raven"
- Brian Wilson – vocals on "A World of Peace Must Come (intro)", background vocals on "The Magic Hand" and "Lonely Man", organ on "Be Still"
- Mark Buckingham – 12-string guitar and arrangement on "Leaves of Grass"

Band on "America, I Know You"

- Brian Wilson – arrangement
- Diane Rovell – leader
- Stella Castelucci – harp
- Alan Estes – mallets, percussion
- Jay Migliori – flute, clarinet
- Tommy Morgan – harmonica
- Ray Pohlman – bass
- Stephen Paletta – atmosphere
