= Michelle Medina =

Ecuadorian singer, television presenter, and social commentator (1986–2019)

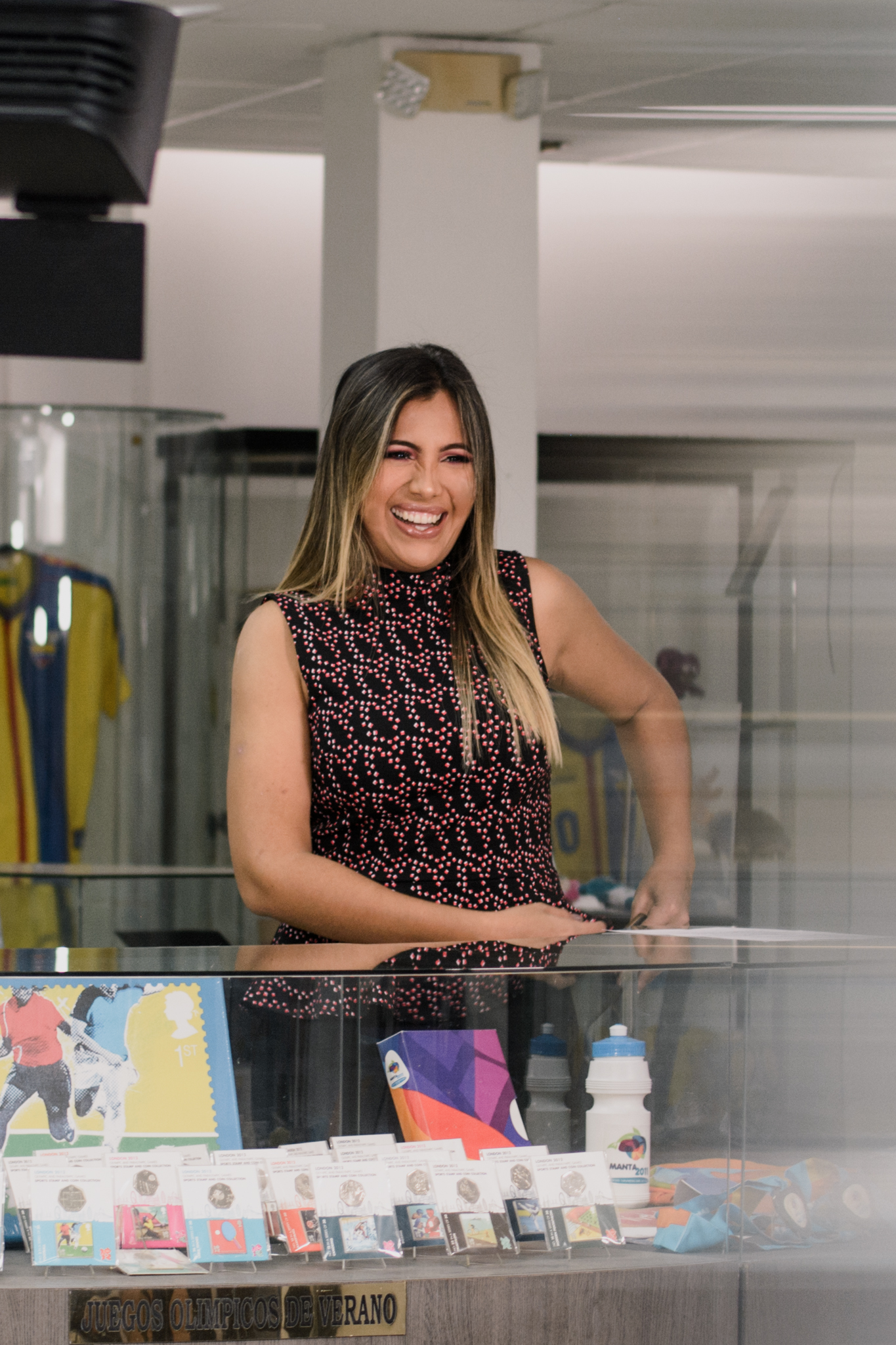
- Medina in 2018
- Born: Michelle Stefania Medina Prado; 17 December 1986; Guayaquil, Ecuador
- Died: 2 July 2019 (aged 32); Guayaquil, Ecuador
- Education: Universidad de Especialidades Espíritu Santo
- Occupations: Singer, TV presenter

Michelle Stefania Medina Prado (17 December 1986 – 2 July 2019) was an Ecuadorian singer, television presenter and social communicator.

== Biography and career ==
Medina was born in Guayaquil on 17 December 1986. Since she was eight years old, she leaned towards music, however she never saw herself as an artist by profession, and said that it is something I usually do, from time to time, because I like it and it fills you a lot when you have an inclination for a art.

As a singer she had several presentations at events such as the election of Reina de Machala, in the Rock of Roy and Max, and collaborated with the Time Project Band with a visa at the 80’s.

She was a student of the Public Relations and Communication degree at the School of Communication of the Universidad de Especialidades Espíritu Santo (UEES), where she was in the last year.

She worked as a television presenter and was an anchor of the Ecuadorian Olympic Committee program in which the work of national athletes stood out, in addition to having been the master of ceremonies of the committee's sporting events. She was also an ambassador of Ecuador in the Forum Olympism in action in the Youth Olympics Buenos Aires 2018.

She was a radio broadcaster, in the space ‘Guayaquil on the air’ with Andrés Spaudo, as part of the Radio City staff, owned by El Universo.

== Illness and death ==
At the end of 2018, Michelle discovered a lesion on her face, and after an exam skin cancer was detected. Due to the high cost of her treatment, several personalities of the medium and artists of the music scene by whom she was much loved, held a charity event on February 21, 2019, at the Fedenador Theater, which was attended by Israel Maldonado, Juan Carlos Coronel, La Peña de Rox and Max, Roy Maruri, Mau Garcerant, along with Azuca Music Band, Gino Freire (stand up comedy), Juan Carlos Gallegos, Diego Govea, Javo Balladares and Nicolás Carrión, under the leadership of Alondra Santiago and Miguel Cedeño. The event was called #TodosporMichelle and had a value of $ 25 entry. Danna Hanna, spokeswoman for the event, said: Michelle's lifestyle is that of a healthy woman, she is very loved in the music scene in Guayaquil, so this group of artists join this cause to raise $ 20,000.

She was also known in social networks as the la chica Ajá, for the word “aha” said by her in an interview for the YouTube channel of Felipe Crespo, who used this expression as a meme frequently in her videos, so Felipe, together with Michelle's cousin, made a video to raise funds for treatment in her segment All for money, and send messages of support from her audience using the hashtag # AjáChallenge.

Her last appearance in public, she did it as a singer when performing a song in a tribute to Selena Quintanilla made by her friend Valeria Vanoni, in June 2019, where she did it with fear of fainting but wanting to sing after her friend invited her to go on stage.

Medina finally died on 2 July 2019 at the age of 32.
