= I Can Hear Music =

1966 song by The Ronettes

Single by the Ronettes
- B-side: "When I Saw You"
- Released: October 1966
- Genre: Pop
- Length: 3:00
- Label: Philles
- Songwriters: Jeff Barry; Ellie Greenwich; Phil Spector
- Producer: Jeff Barry

The Ronettes singles chronology
"Is This What I Get for Loving You?" (1965)	"I Can Hear Music" (1966)	"You Came, You Saw, You Conquered!" (1969)

Official audio
- "I Can Hear Music" on YouTube

"I Can Hear Music" is a song written by Jeff Barry, Ellie Greenwich and Phil Spector for American girl group the Ronettes (credited as The Ronettes Featuring Veronica) in 1966. This version spent one week on the Billboard Pop chart at number 100. In early 1969, the Beach Boys released a cover version as a single from their album 20/20 (1969), peaking at number 24 in the US.

Cash Box said that "Ronnie sings a strong lead throughout the teen-oriented, emotion filled tune which is effectively backed by throbbing sounds." Record World described it as a "slow but torrid goodie."

== The Beach Boys version ==
"I Can Hear Music"

Single by the Beach Boys

from the album 20/20
- B-side: "All I Want to Do"
- Released: March 3, 1969
- Recorded: October 1, 1968
- Genre: Baroque pop
- Length: 2:36
- Label: Capitol
- Songwriters: Jeff Barry; Ellie Greenwich; Phil Spector
- Producer: Carl Wilson

The Beach Boys singles chronology
"Bluebirds over the Mountain" (1968)	"I Can Hear Music" (1969)	"Break Away" (1969)

Official audio
- "I Can Hear Music" on YouTube

"I Can Hear Music" was covered by the American rock band the Beach Boys, released on their 1969 album 20/20 with Carl Wilson on lead vocals. This version peaked at No. 24 on the US Billboard Hot 100 (their final top 40 hit until 1976). The song did best in Europe, reaching number 10 in the United Kingdom.

Within the US and Canada, it peaked on playlists in the top 5 in Boston, Houston and Dallas; No. 7 in New York and Chicago (WCFL); No. 8 in Toronto and San Diego, No. 9 in Seattle; No. 10 in Vancouver and Indianapolis; No. 11 in Los Angeles, Louisville, Providence, and Chicago (WLS); No. 12 in Milwaukee and Columbus.

=== Personnel ===
Credits from Craig Slowinski, and 20/20 liner notes.

The Beach Boys

- Al Jardine – backing vocals, guitar, handclaps
- Mike Love – backing vocals, handclaps
- Carl Wilson – lead vocals, guitar, handclaps, producer; tambourine (uncertain)
- Dennis Wilson — drums, piano, handclaps
- Bruce Johnston – backing vocals, bass, Fender Rhodes electric piano, handclaps

Additional personnel

- Steve Desper – engineer
- Mike Kowalski – snare drum, sleigh bells

=== Chart history ===
Chart (1969)	Peak position
Australia (Go-Set)	13
Canada RPM Top Singles	34
Chile	12
Germany	13
Ireland (IRMA)	15
Malaysia	6
Netherlands	6
New Zealand (Listener)	11
Poland	7
Sweden	5
UK Singles (OCC)	10
U.S. Billboard Hot 100	24
U.S. Cash Box Top 100	20
U.S. Record World	20

== Larry Lurex version ==
"I Can Hear Music"

Single by Larry Lurex
- B-side: "Goin' Back"
- Released: 29 June 1973 (US)
- Studio: Trident, London
- Genre: Glam rock; soft rock
- Length: 3:22
- Label: EMI
- Songwriters: Jeff Barry; Ellie Greenwich; Phil Spector
- Producer: Robin Geoffrey Cable

Official Lyric Video
- "I Can Hear Music" on YouTube

In 1973, Larry Lurex, the solo stage name of Freddie Mercury, recorded "I Can Hear Music" on the EMI label. His version peaked at #115 on the U.S. Billboard Bubbling Under the Hot 100 chart.

== Kathy Troccoli version ==
In 1996, the Beach Boys rerecorded the song, with contemporary Christian singer Kathy Troccoli on lead vocals, for their country album Stars and Stripes Vol. 1.
