= All I Want to Do (The Beach Boys song) =

- The Spanish single release of the song

Song by the Beach Boys

from the album 20/20
- Released: February 10, 1969
- Recorded: November 12–21, 1968
- Studio: Beach Boys Studio, Capitol Studios
- Genre: Hard rock, blue-eyed soul
- Length: 2:02
- Label: Capitol
- Songwriters: Dennis Wilson, Stephen Kalinich
- Producer: Dennis Wilson

Licensed audio
- "All I Want to Do" on YouTube

"All I Want to Do" is a song by American rock band the Beach Boys from their 1969 album 20/20. It was written by Dennis Wilson and Stephen Kalinich, and released as the B-side to "I Can Hear Music".

== Recording ==
An earlier version of "All I Want to Do" was produced on October 16, 1968, at Bell Sound in New York. The backing track was redone at Valentine Studio on November 9. At another session, held three days later, Dennis recorded himself at Capitol Studios having sex with a woman, whose throes of passion were incorporated into the track as background sound effects.

== Alternate releases ==
Multiple alternate versions, including two alternate takes with Dennis on lead vocals, were released in 2018 on I Can Hear Music: The 20/20 Sessions.

== Personnel ==
Credits from Craig Slowinski, and 20/20 liner notes.

The Beach Boys

- Al Jardine – backing vocals
- Mike Love – lead vocals
- Carl Wilson – backing vocals, electric rhythm guitar
- Dennis Wilson – backing vocals, piano, Hammond organ, producer
- Bruce Johnston – backing vocals

Additional personnel

- Ed Carter – electric lead guitar, bass
- Steve Desper – engineer
- Mike Kowalski – drums
- Roger Neumann and six unidentified others – horns
