= Roger Neumann =

American jazz musician

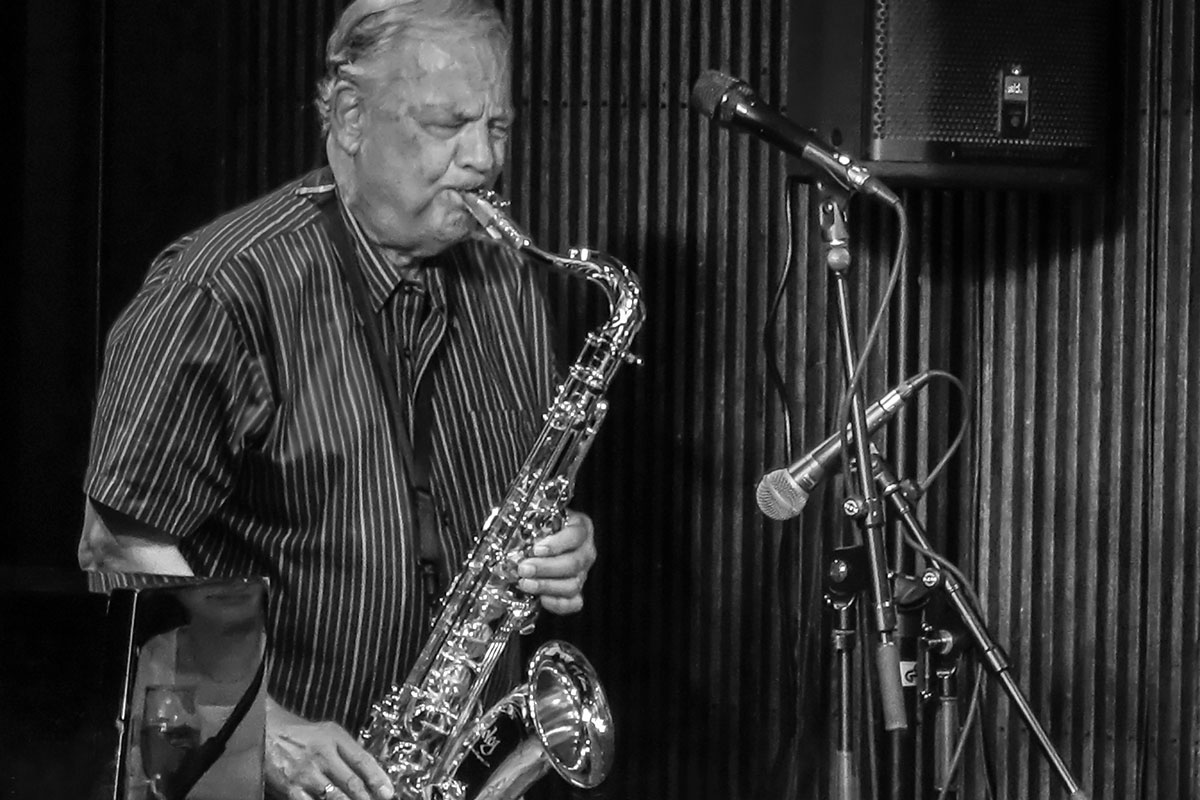
Roger Neumann (2015) Aarhus Jazzfestival, Denmark

Roger Neumann (3 January 1941 – 28 November 2018) was an American jazz saxophonist, flutist, composer, arranger, and music educator.

He wrote arrangements for Count Basie, Buddy Rich, and The Beach Boys. He taught in Los Angeles and at the annual Reggie Schive Jazz Camp at Iowa Lakes Community College in Estherville, Iowa. He was principal director of Buddy Collette's JazzAmerica, a non-profit organization run by bassist Richard Simon that provides free jazz education to young players. He was a mentor for the L.A. Jazz Society.

== Early life ==
Neumann was born in Minot, North Dakota, lived for a short while in Akron, Ohio, then moved to Spencer, Iowa, at age five. He began studying soprano saxophone at a young age under the tutelage of his father, Hugo Neumann, a professional trombone and saxophone player.

In middle school he switched to tenor saxophone, his main instrument for the rest of his career. He began playing professionally in northwest Iowa while in high school, then became a music major at Morningside College in Sioux City, Iowa. While in high school and college he played and wrote arrangements for the Billy Redman Band, a 10-piece territory band. He played in jazz clubs in Sioux City during the late 1950s and early '60s. After graduating, he toured with the Jack Gillespie Band from Minneapolis then joined the Lee Castle/Jimmy Dorsey Band. After that he became a public school band director in Guthrie Center, Iowa.

In 1965, Neumann enrolled at the Berklee School of Music. After two years at Berklee, he was offered a job by Woody Herman to join Herman's Thundering Herd, with whom he toured for the balance of that year. He is heard with that edition of the Herman band on the 1967 recording Concerto for Herd recorded live at the Monterey Jazz Festival, soloing on "Big Sur Echo."

== Career ==
After moving to Los Angeles in 1968, Neumann worked the Bob Crosby Band, Les Brown & The Band of Renown, Benny Carter, Ray Anthony, Tex Beneke, the Bill Elliot Swing Orchestra, and singer Anita O'Day. In 1975, he formed Roger Neumann's Rather Large Band. The Rather Large Band released Introducing Roger Neumann's Rather Large Band (1983) and Instant Heat (1994). Neumann has played baritone saxophone and contributed arrangements to the Phil Norman Tentet. In 2002, he won the LA Jazz Society's Jazz Composer/Arranger Award.

== Personal life ==
He was married to singer Madeline Vergari. His Rather Large Band played on her album This Is My Lucky Day.
