= Smile (The Beach Boys album) =

Unfinished studio album by the Beach Boys

- One of the covers prepared by Capitol's art department; illustration by Frank Holmes

Studio album (unfinished) by the Beach Boys
- Recorded: February 17, 1966 – May 18, 1967 (initial sessions); June 1967 – July 1971 (later recordings)
- Studios: Western; Columbia; Gold Star; Sound Recorders; Capitol; Beach Boys (Los Angeles)
- Genres: Art pop; progressive pop; psychedelia; experimental
- Producer: Brian Wilson

The Beach Boys recording chronology
Pet Sounds (1966)	Smile (1966–1967)	Smiley Smile (1967)

Smile (stylized as SMiLE) is an unfinished album by the American rock band the Beach Boys, conceived as the follow-up to their 1966 album Pet Sounds. The project—a concept album involving themes of Americana, humor, youth, innocence, and the natural world—was planned as a twelve-track LP assembled from modular fragments, the same editing process used on their single "Good Vibrations". After a year of recording, the album was shelved and a downscaled version, Smiley Smile, was released in September 1967. The original project came to be regarded as the most legendary unreleased album in popular music history.

The album was produced and primarily composed by Brian Wilson with guest lyricist and assistant arranger Van Dyke Parks, together envisioning the project as a Rhapsody in Blue–influenced riposte to contemporary rock trends and the British Invasion. Wilson touted Smile as a "teenage symphony to God", intended to surpass Pet Sounds and inaugurate the band's Brother Records imprint. Consuming over 50 hours of tape across more than 80 recording sessions, its content ranged from musical and spoken word to sound effects and role-playing. Its influences spanned mysticism, classical music, ragtime, pre–rock and roll pop, jazz, doo-wop, musique concrète, and cartoons. Planned elements included word paintings, tape manipulation, acoustic experiments, comedic interludes, and the band's most challenging and complex vocals to this point. The projected lead singles were "Heroes and Villains", about early California history, and "Vega-Tables", a promotion of organic food.

Numerous issues, including legal entanglements with Capitol Records, Wilson's uncompromising perfectionism and mental instabilities, as well as Parks' withdrawal from the project in early 1967, delayed the album. Most tracks were produced between August and December 1966, but few were finished, and its structure was never finalized. Fearing the public's reaction, Wilson blocked its release. A mythology bolstered by journalists present at the sessions soon surrounded the project. Long the subject of debate and speculation over its tracks and sequencing, Wilson's unfulfilled ambitions inspired many musicians and groups, especially those in indie rock, post-punk, electronic, and chamber pop genres.

Smile was reported to be half-finished before pared-down versions of six tracks were issued on Smiley Smile; further material was reworked into new songs such as "Cool, Cool Water". From 1968 to 1971, three additional tracks—"Our Prayer", "Cabinessence" and "Surf's Up"—were completed by the band. Since the 1980s, extensive session recordings have circulated widely on bootlegs, allowing fans to assemble hypothetical versions of a finished album, adding to its legacy as an interactive project. In 2004, Wilson, Parks, and Darian Sahanaja rearranged Smile for live performances, billed as Brian Wilson Presents Smile, which Wilson later adapted into a solo album. He considered this version to be substantially different from his original vision. The 2011 compilation The Smile Sessions included the first official approximation of the Beach Boys' completed album and received universal acclaim.

== Background ==
By the end of 1965, having withdrawn from concert tours, Wilson had distanced himself from his bandmates and networked further within the Los Angeles music scene while increasingly using drugs such as marijuana, LSD (or "acid"), and Desbutal. (Note: According to his then-wife Marilyn, Wilson's new friends "had the gift of gab [...] All of a sudden [Brian] was in Hollywood—these people talk a language that was fascinating to him. Anybody that was different and talked cosmic or whatever [...] he liked it.") He forged a close relationship with Loren Schwartz, an aspiring talent agent, and sought to make the Beach Boys' eleventh studio album, Pet Sounds, a clear departure from previous releases. (Note: Schwarts supervised Wilson's first LSD trip and introduced him to college-favored literature, including The Little Prince, poetry by Kahlil Gibran, works by Hermann Hesse, and texts by Krishna. On his first LSD experience, Wilson described the event as "very religious" and claimed to have perceived God.) He opted not to work with his usual lyricist, bandmate Mike Love, and instead collaborated mainly with jingle writer Tony Asher, at Schwartz's recommendation. In December of that year, Byrds member David Crosby introduced Wilson to Van Dyke Parks, a songwriter, arranger, session musician, and former child actor who had relocated to Los Angeles in the early 1960s to play in local folk revival scenes.

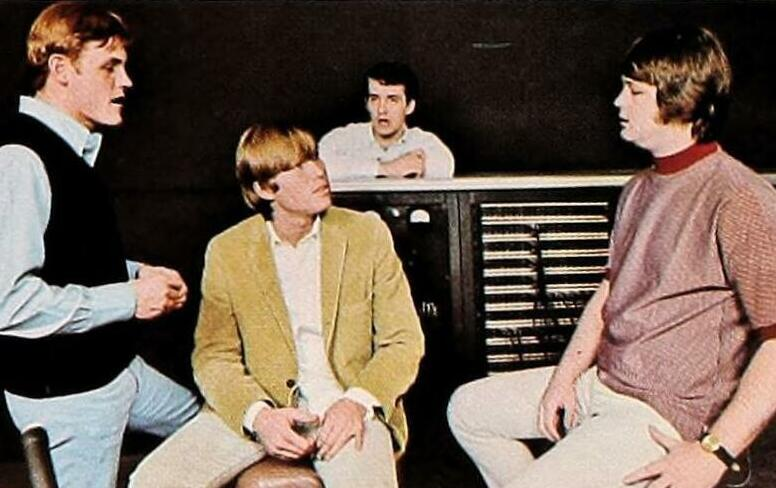
From left: Bruce Johnston, Terry Melcher, Tony Asher, and Brian Wilson at a Pet Sounds recording session in early 1966.

On February 17, 1966, Wilson began recording "Good Vibrations", first intended for Pet Sounds but later excluded due to his dissatisfaction with the initial recording, experimenting with several arrangements until April. On May 4, during the fourth session for "Good Vibrations", he began recording the track in sections rather than as one continuous performance, intending to splice the segments together later. (Note: Later that year, Wilson expressed a desire to craft songs with multiple layers, favoring longer singles that could incorporate distinct movements, "in the same way as a classical concerto", though in a condensed format.) Through 1966, Parks briefly signed with MGM Records, who released his first two singles, and played on albums by the Byrds and other acts, after which his activity centered on select Warner Bros. pop groups.

Through Parks or Bruce Johnston, Wilson was introduced to former Beatles press officer Derek Taylor, soon recruited as the Beach Boys' publicist and initiator of a promotional campaign that branded Wilson as a pop "genius". Pet Sounds was released on May 16 and immediately became a landmark album for its sophisticated orchestral arrangements and its role in positioning the Beach Boys among top rock innovators. In the U.S., the album confused their fans and sold worse than previous Beach Boys releases, whereas the British embraced it warmly. This UK success encouraged Wilson to take greater creative risks and convinced Capitol Records to support his next ambitious project.

== Collaboration and surrounding milieu ==
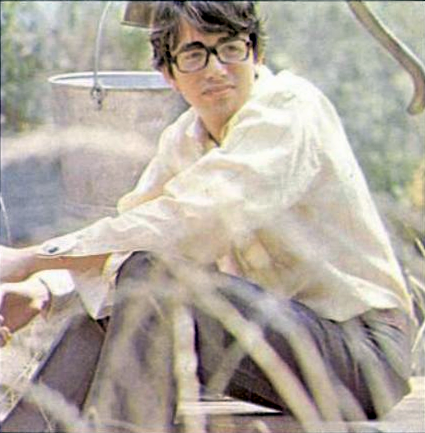
Van Dyke Parks (pictured 1967) provided most of Smile's lyrics and thematic direction and participated as an instrumentalist in the recording sessions.

In mid-July 1966, Wilson reconnected with Parks at a house party hosted by Byrds producer and Johnston collaborator Terry Melcher. (Note: Badman cites February as the meeting date.) Impressed by his articulate manner, Wilson, seeking a new lyricist, later offered him a collaboration on the Beach Boys' next album. (Note: Wilson did not initially inform his bandmates of his decision to collaborate with Parks, and Parks agreed to join the project despite concerns raised by reports of Asher's split from Wilson and the band.) Between July and September, the pair composed numerous songs at Wilson's Beverly Hills home. Originally titled Dumb Angel, the project was retitled to Smile by September, and writing sessions continued throughout October and November. They usually worked late at night to suit Wilson's schedule; Parks remained on call for writing sessions and, as the project intensified, he and his wife Durrie often slept at Wilson's house.

Like Asher, Parks had limited experience in lyric writing, and Wilson was largely unaware of his collaborator's musical background. (Note: Parks had attended some "Good Vibrations" recording sessions, and believed that his suggestions regarding the song's cello, initially recorded in June, convinced Wilson of their shared creative understanding.) Wilson recalled that their writing sessions typically began with a rhythm pattern from Parks, which he would then develop into a melody before Parks immediately drafted lyrics. Wilson rarely altered a word. According to Durrie, "It was fairly evenly balanced. Brian was very deferential to Van Dyke. He never gave up his own point of view and neither did Van Dyke, and I think that's why the collaboration was so strong." Wilson credited him with inspiring "me to come up with new licks and new melodic ideas". Parks occasionally performed on Smile recordings but stated that he did not originate any musical material and played only when directed. (Note: Journalist Geoffrey Himes reported that although Parks did not write any music, he did collaborate with Wilson on the arrangements. Parks recalled in 2004, "I don't think I had a role in the studio. I can clearly remember, without doubt, the fact that I never made up a note. [...] I played what I was told..")

All of a sudden it wasn't just Brian and me in a room; it was Brian and me and David Anderle and Michael Vosse and Loren Schwartz and Terry Sachen and all kinds of self-interested people pulling him in various directions.

— Van Dyke Parks

Their collaboration was increasingly influenced by Wilson's expanding social circle, a group he regularly solicited for feedback. (Note: Wilson installed headphones at each seat around his dining room table for listening sessions, which sometimes continued in his bedroom, where guests listened alongside him as he monitored their responses.) Biographer Steven Gaines characterized Wilson's circle as a mix of both exploitative individuals and those who were "talented" and "industrious". This included MGM talent scout David Anderle and his client, singer Danny Hutton, who had performed with Parks; Hutton later introduced Parks to Anderle, who soon became his manager. (Note: Anderle first met Wilson in 1965 through a family member and had been a key member of the Community for Fact and Freedom (CAFF), an organization formed by Byrds manager Jim Dickson with its headquarters in Derek Taylor's office. Similarly, Hutton and Wilson first met in late 1964 and became better acquainted after Anderle reintroduced them in late 1965.) Michael Vosse, a magazine reporter and college friend of Anderle, was introduced to Wilson by Parks and tasked by Taylor to interview him for the forthcoming release of "Good Vibrations". The day after their meeting, Wilson called Vosse and offered him a job recording natural sounds. Many of these individuals, later dubbed "the Vosse Posse" by Beach Boys fans, became regulars at Wilson's home and during studio sessions. Turtles singer Mark Volman, who was also introduced to Wilson by Hutton, later remarked that his association had felt akin to being a "groupie for Brian".

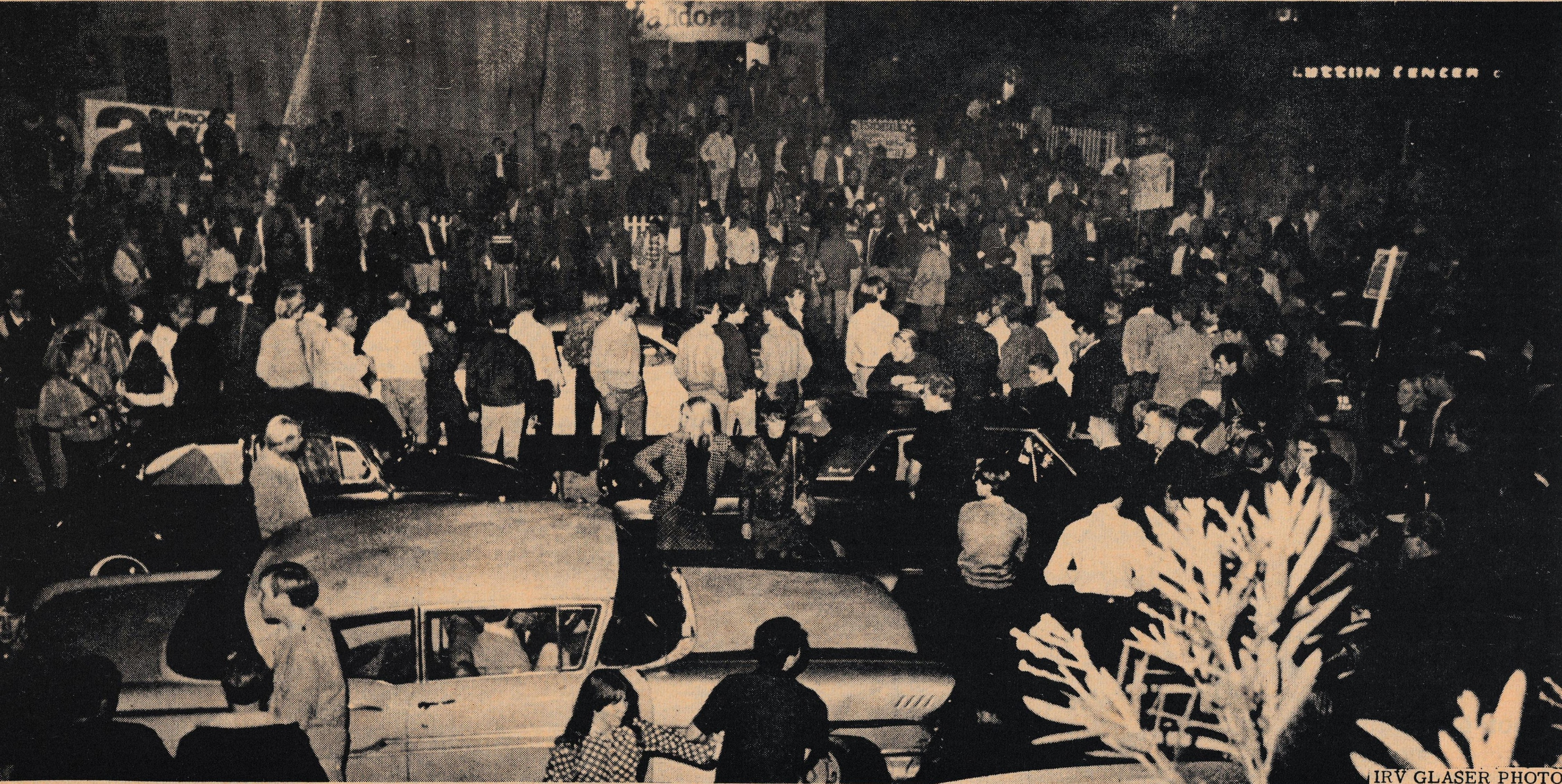
The Smile recording period coincided with the late 1966 Sunset Strip riots (pictured).

Journalists were similarly integrated into this milieu. Paul Jay Robbins, from the Los Angeles Free Press and a New Left political activist involved in the 1966 Sunset Strip curfew riots, met Parks at Byrds concerts, which led to his inclusion in Wilson's circle. Paul Williams, the 18-year-old founder and editor of Crawdaddy!, expressed admiration for Pet Sounds and "Good Vibrations", and subsequently visited Wilson at his home at Christmas 1966 before returning to New York. Jules Siegel, from The Saturday Evening Post, was introduced to Wilson by Anderle and accompanied him at his home and in the studio for two months. Richard Goldstein, the first rock critic from The Village Voice, and Lawrence Dietz, from New York magazine, was also among those involved.

Anderle said, "Smile was going to be a monument. That's the way we talked about it, as a monument." Journalist Nick Kent, writing in 1975, believed that the reliability of figures such as Anderle, Siegel, and Vosse had been compromised by claims "so lavish [that] one can be forgiven, if only momentarily, for believing that Brian Wilson had, at that time orbited out to the furthermost reaches of the celestial stratosphere for the duration of this starcrossed project." Gaines, in 1986, acknowledged that the "events surrounding the album" varied so greatly by individual perspective that the facts remain uncertain, while Williams stated that he, Wilson, Anderle, Parks, Taylor, and other journalists were "very stoned", which may have affected their perception of events.

== Inspiration and scope ==
Wilson originally planned several projects—including a sound effects collage, a comedy album, and a "health food" album—but Capitol's lack of support for these ideas spurred the Beach Boys to form their own label, Brother Records. (Note: Initiated in August 1966 under Anderle, the label was announced later that year as a platform for introducing "entirely new concepts to the recording industry" while granting the Beach Boys full creative and promotional control over their work. He described the label as a means for releasing projects considered "special" for Wilson, recalling that distribution by Capitol was not an initial concern.) Anderle stated that it was "important" to recognize that the Smile recordings defied any attempt at consolidation, as Wilson's ideas ranged from concepts for an elemental-themed suite to "humor albums", originally separate from Smile, which was intended as "the culmination of all of [his] intellectual occupations". Hutton disputed the notion that Wilson had a fully formed album in mind, stating, "I think he created all this music at a certain period, and if it had been all packaged at the time, it would have been called SMiLE ... But I never heard him say, 'My next album is going to be called SMiLE''." Journalist Tom Nolan, present at the sessions, later reported that Wilson's expansive ideas included an album constructed from "sound effects" with "chords spliced together through a whole LP". Nolan further observed that when Wilson briefly turned his attention to films, it appeared he could "capture more" in his art, explaining, "If you couldn't get a sound from a carrot, you could show a carrot. He would really liked to have made music that was a carrot."

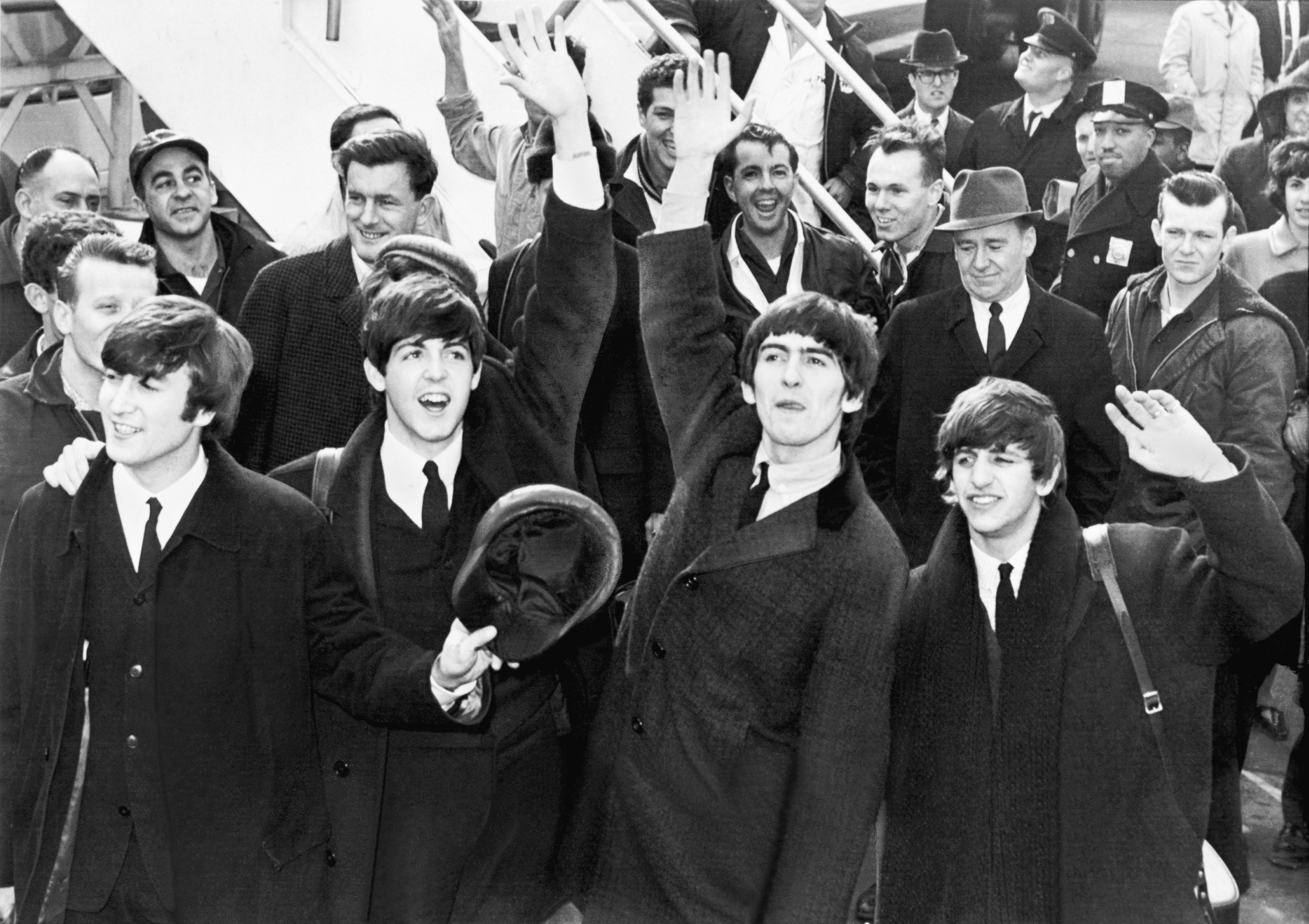
According to Van Dyke Parks, Smile was partly intended to reclaim popular music from the influence of British acts like the Beatles (pictured in 1964).

Smile was conceived to be explicitly American in style and subject matter, a deliberate riposte to the British influences that dominated contemporary rock music. (Note: The Beach Boys' evolution from traditional rock conventions to progressive experimentation, spearheaded by Wilson, had pioneered a trajectory for rock groups later emulated by numerous bands associated with the 1964 British Invasion, and his success as a producer and composer had positioned the Beach Boys as the Beatles' foremost rivals in both artistic innovation and commercial reach by 1965.) Wilson said that he had aimed to "Americanize" both early and mid-America, much as George Gershwin "Americanized" jazz and classical music. According to Parks, Gershwin's 1924 composition Rhapsody in Blue encapsulated a "musical kaleidoscope" of America, a quality that both he and Wilson sought to emulate. He explained that they "wanted to investigate [...] American images" and slang, deliberately taking a "gauche route" to counter the era's pervasive British fixation. Many artists had adopted British inflections to mimic the Beatles' style; in Parks' description, Wilson faced no other alternative but to combat these developments, as he was effectively "the last man standing".

Numerous authors state that Wilson intended Smile as a response to the Beatles' August 1966 release Revolver. (Note: According to biographer Robert Rodriguez, Wilson felt that Revolver had topped his achievements on Pet Sounds. He writes the Beach Boys crafted Smile as a response, a sentiment echoed by David Howard. Mark Prendergast writes that Wilson devoted much of 1966 to "Good Vibrations" to "keep up" with the Beatles. Journalist Andrew Sacher, after examining many books, documentaries, and articles about the subject, states that Wilson himself "never seems to mention Revolver", possibly because his "main goal in late 1966 was topping his own Pet Sounds". In a 1969 interview, Mike Love said that the record did not affect Wilson's music, remarking that "Brian was in his own world, believe me.") Parks recalled Wilson afforded little attention to the Beatles' concurrent output and "was more taken by [their surrounding] mania". In a 2004 interview, Wilson mentioned that while the 1965 album Rubber Soul had inspired his artistic ambitions with Pet Sounds, Smile was meant to be "something more advanced" than pop music and incomparable to the Beatles.

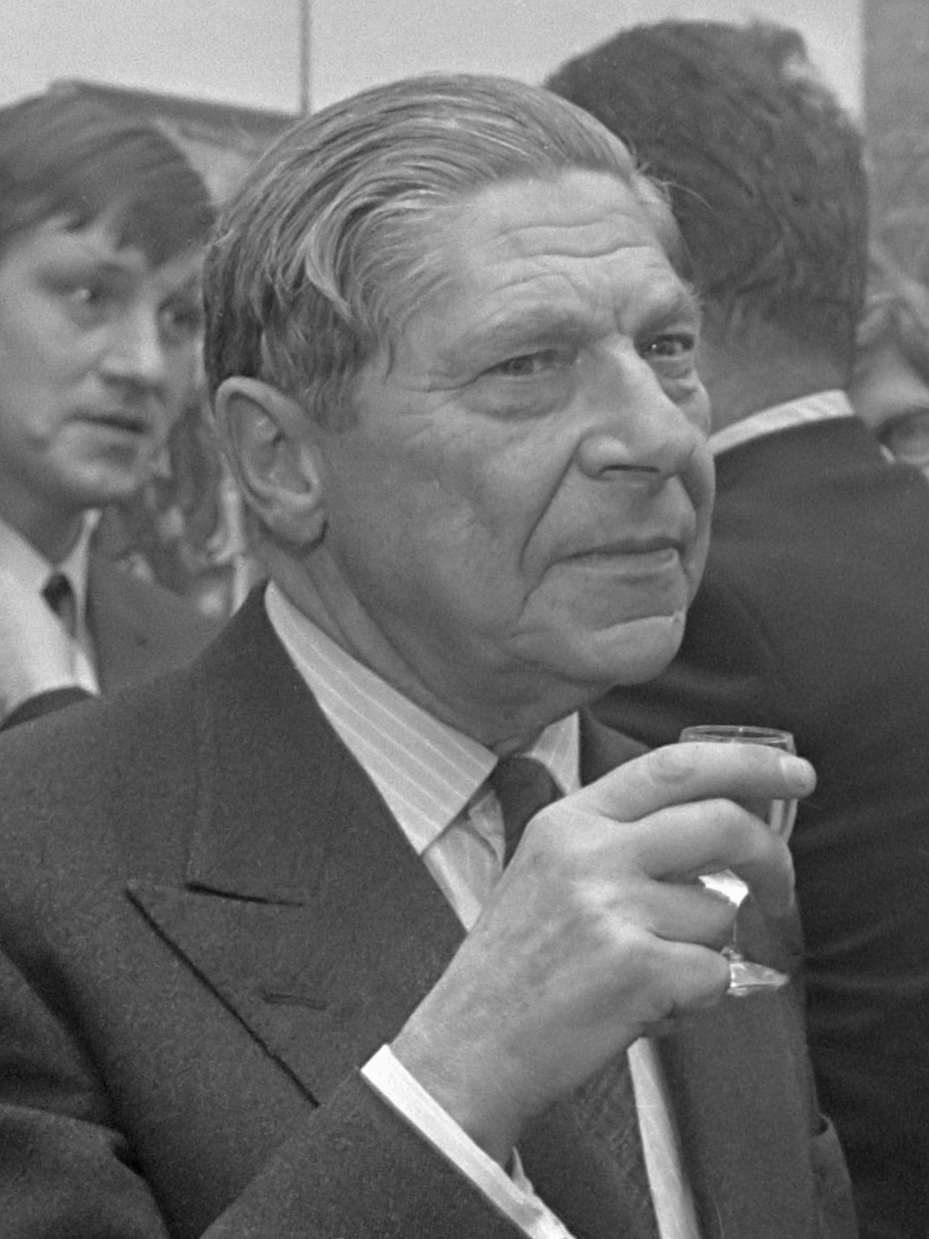
Wilson stated that his understanding of ego and humor drew on the writings of Arthur Koestler (pictured)

The project was also inspired by Wilson's growing interest in subjects such as astrology, numerology and the occult. (Note: After a friend introduced him to Pickwick Bookshop in Hollywood, Wilson became an avid reader, later stating in 1976 that overexposure to disparate authors left him with "too many paths to choose from". According to Nolan, one anonymous observer remembered that whenever someone introduced a new idea to Wilson, whether astrology or Russia-China relations, it would invariably "find its way into the music".) His library reportedly included works spanning poetry, prose, and cultural criticism—such as Arthur Koestler's The Act of Creation (1964), which he frequently cited—alongside texts on non-Christian belief systems such as Hinduism (from the Bhagavad Gita), Confucianism (via the I Ching), Buddhism, and Subud. (Note: Anderle, recounting Wilson's fixation on humor and spirituality, said his "innate sense of spiritualism" had led him to explore numerology, astrology, and the I Ching.) These works promoted practices like meditation and vegetarianism, in which Wilson took interest. Wilson, in 2005, described his engagement with metaphysics as "crucial" and The Act of Creation as pivotal: "It turned me on to very special things [...] people attach their egos to their sense of humor before anything else." Vosse recalled Wilson stating that "laughter was one of the highest forms of divinity" and that he had intended to create "a humor album"; Vosse later surmised that Smile would have manifested as a "sophisticated" Southern California-inspired gospel album, reflecting Wilson's "own form of revival music."

Psychedelic music will cover the face of the world and color the whole popular music scene. Anybody happening is psychedelic.

— Brian Wilson quoted in TeenSet, late 1966

Jules Siegel recalled Wilson, during one evening in October 1966, announcing to friends his intent to create a "teenage symphony to God", also describing a shift toward a "white spiritual sound" he believed would define music's future. Wilson cited the Beatles' latest work as part of a broader "religious" movement in music, stating, "That's where I'm going. It's going to scare a lot of people." That November, Nolan reported Wilson's artistic shift stemmed from a prior psychedelic experience, though Wilson later stated he would not take LSD again. Asked about music's trajectory, Wilson predicted "White spirituals [...] Songs of faith." (Note: Parks, in the 1970s, said that Wilson had envisioned Smile as experimenting with "the mind-expanding possibilities of music and the mind-expanding properties of drugs". In 2004 interviews, Wilson rejected claims that Smile was influenced by LSD, Zen, or religion. Anderle also rejected drugs as an influence on Wilson's artistic pursuits.)

Wilson said that the album's original working title, Dumb Angel, was discarded after the group opted for a "more cheery" alternative. His brother Carl explained in early 1967 that the final title, Smile, had reflected the band's focus on spirituality and "spreading goodwill, good thoughts and happiness". (Note: Carlin speculated the Dumb Angel name derived from hallucinations Wilson experienced while composing under Desbutals late at night. Wilson's 2016 memoir, I Am Brian Wilson: A Memoir, states that the lowercase "i" in the cover art's SMiLE spelling referenced the loss of ego, one of the album's concepts.)

== Themes and lyrics ==
Wilson said that after the emotionally intense and personal nature of Pet Sounds, he sought a less direct approach to lyrics through his collaboration with Parks. He maintained a hands-off role in the album's thematic direction: "Van Dyke had a lot of knowledge about America. ... We wanted to get back to basics and try something simple. We wanted to capture something as basic as the mood of water and fire." (Note: Parks suggested in interviews that he and Wilson had shared an understanding of the album's Americana theme, but in a 2005 response to a New York Review of Books article, he wrote, "Manifest Destiny, Plymouth Rock, etc. were the last things on his mind when he asked me to take a free hand in the lyrics and the album's thematic direction".) Parks' lyrics employed wordplay, allusions, and quotations; he stated a focus on the "power of words" over wordplay and word choices open for multiple interpretations. Although Smile is identified as a concept album, the surviving recordings lack a structured narrative and instead weave disparate themes. Parks rejected the "concept album" framing and stated the project aimed to employ "American vernacular" amid prevailing "soundalike Beatle-esque music around."

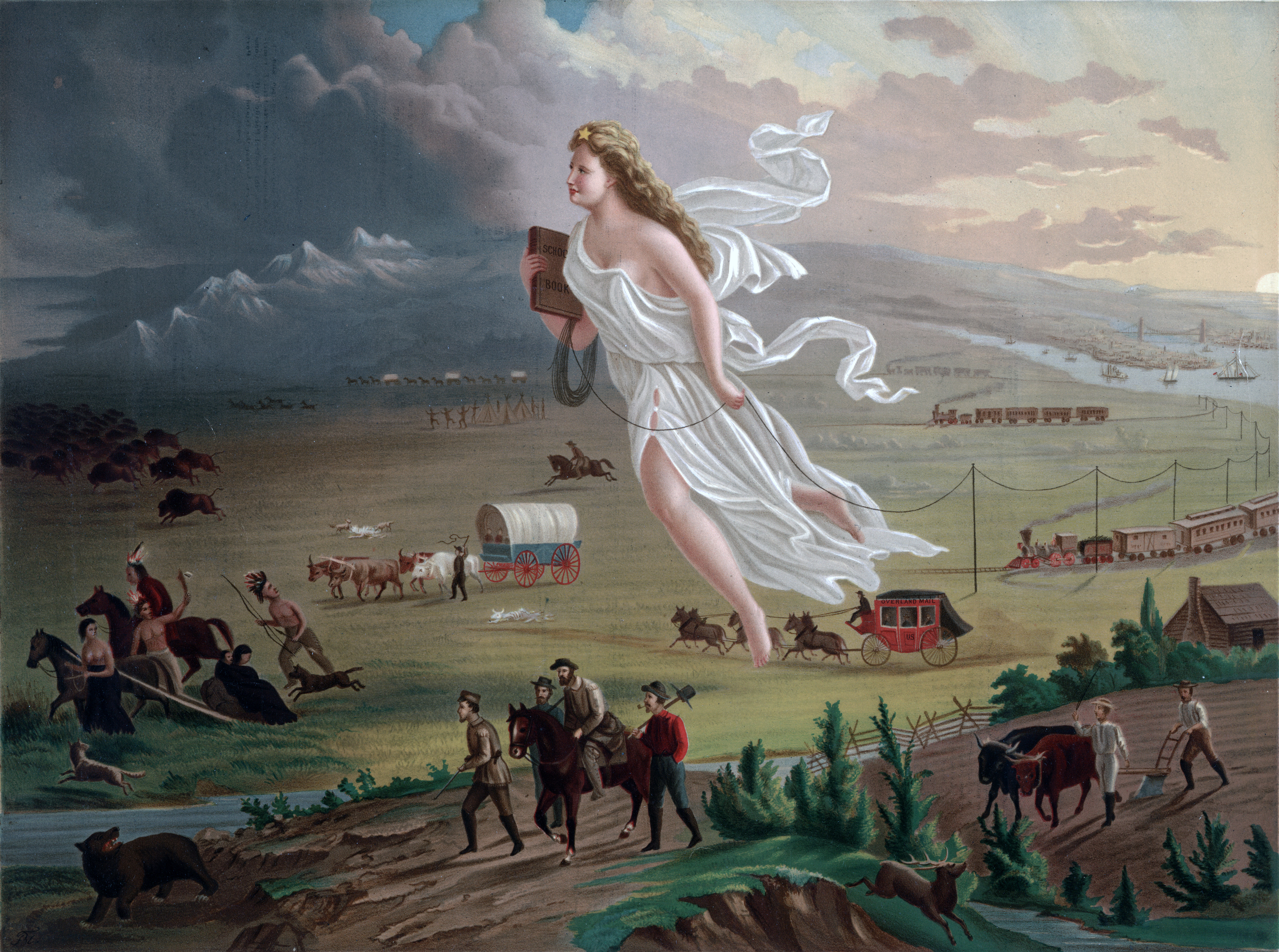
Smile engaged with notions of Manifest Destiny. Image: American Progress by John Gast (1872).

Parks characterized his lyrical approach to Smile as accommodating Wilson's fragmentary musical ideas, which he described as "short spasms of enthusiasm" and disconnected sections that collectively embodied a "cartoon consciousness". He pursued impressionistic vignettes depicting a range of archetypal scenarios and symbols tied to American history, spanning railroads and automobiles to Western colonialism's impact on Native American communities. According to Parks, it was "important to capture the westward movement, the conquering of this continent and beyond [...] with some anecdotes and snapshots". Scholar Darren Reid surmised that the album's historical Americana was a deliberate counterpoint to the Beach Boys' earlier hedonistic themes, arguing that its mood incorporated humor, sarcasm, and introspection rather than overt happiness, with the titular "smile" suggesting irony.

There is a wealth of material that diverges from this purported Americana focus, according to musicologist Marshall Heiser. (Note: Heiser speculated that the ambiguity may have further complicated attempts to assemble a final track assembly.) This included themes of physical fitness, childhood, and the natural environment. Themes of spirituality and childhood permeate songs like "Wonderful", "Child Is Father of the Man", and "Surf's Up", though only "Wonderful" explicitly references God. Parks acknowledged spirituality's "inescapable" role in Smile but avoided overt religious lyrics to avoid appearing "uppity". He reflected that the album grappled with questions of belief familiar to Wilson's and his own religious upbringings: "What should we keep from [...] the hard-wiring we had with religion? [...] There's a lot of thinking about belief." In 2011 interviews, Wilson described Smile as embodying themes of childhood, freedom, and resistance to adult conformity, saying its message was "Adults keep out. This is about the spirit of youth." When a journalist characterized the album as "impressionistic psychedelic folk rock" that captures childhood's "psychedelic magic", Wilson endorsed the description.

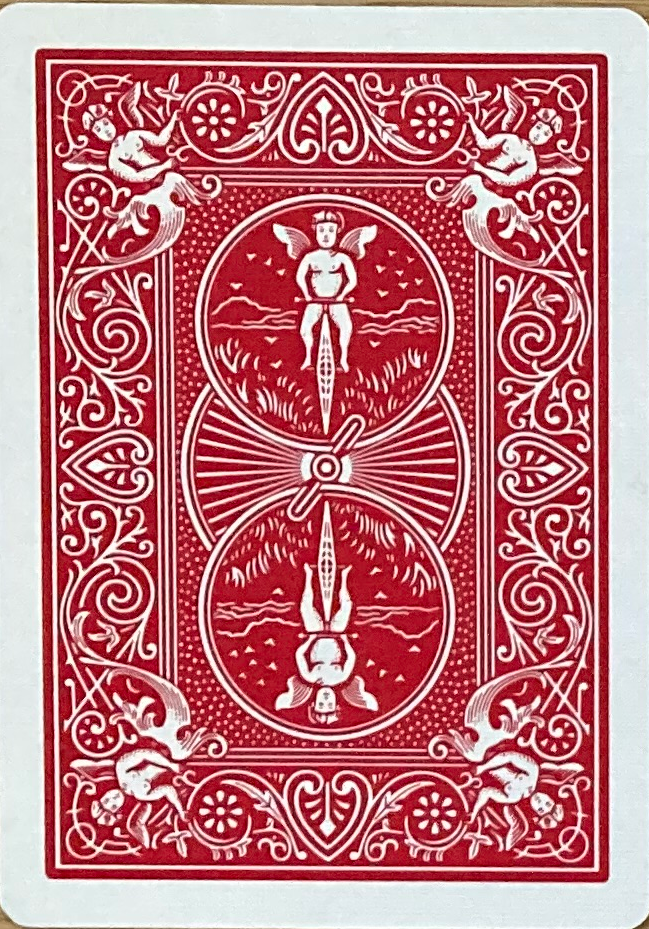
References to a "bicycle rider" were inspired by 19th-century "Rider Back" playing cards.

A recurring melodic and rhythmic motif, sometimes called the "Bicycle Rider" theme, was configured into several tracks. The lyric references 19th-century "Rider Back" playing cards by the United States Playing Card Company, which depicted angelic cupids on bicycles, and were commonly used in American social settings, including saloon bars. Parks commented, "A lot of people misinterpreted that, but that's OK; it's OK not to be told what to think, if you're an audience." (Note: Philip Lambert characterized Smile as an American historical narrative framed through a time-traveling cyclist's "journey from Plymouth Rock to Hawaii", while biographer Keith Badman interpreted Wilson's intent as an exploration of youthful innocence within an Americana context. Historian Dale Carter summarized Smile as engaging with history, culture, and societal themes while exploring faith through national allegiance, ideology, religion, and spirituality. He argued that the album expanded the introspective focus of Pet Sounds into an examination of American identity. Williams wryly suggested the album might chronicle "the story of the unnatural love affair between one man's voice and a harpsichord".)

== Music and production ==
=== Modular approach and stylistic range ===
Smile has been described by various commentators as a work of art pop, psychedelic rock, avant-pop, progressive pop, experimental rock, folk rock, musique concrète, and Americana music. The sessions generated over 50 hours of recordings, spanning music, spoken word, sound effects, and role-play. Many segments functioned as word paintings, evoking imagery of physical entities or settings. Ethnomusicologist David Toop likened Wilson's style to "cartoon music and Disney influence mutating into avant-garde pop", while Heiser argued the album defies singular categorization, instead comprising a "complex, nebulous macrocosm" of disparate elements. These included Renaissance-style chromatic vocal arrangements (similar to a Carlo Gesualdo vocal motet), aquatic chants ("swim swim fishy"), Wild West film score pastiches, cartoonish caveman gutturals, a feigned "group orgasm", and surreal skits ranging from a man trapped inside a microphone to a group of French horns mimicking speech and laughter.

We did things in sections. There might just be a few bars of music, or a verse, or a particular groove, or vamp [...] They would all fit. You could put them one in front of the other, or arrange it in any way you wanted. [...] It was sort of like making films I think.

— Carl Wilson, 1973

Unlike the 1960s norm of single-take recordings, Wilson had employed tape splicing techniques as early as 1964 to refine vocal performances, a method that evolved into his modular recording process for "Good Vibrations" and Smile. (Note: David Toop contested "modular" in favor of "cellular" to describe the album's interlocking yet discrete musical units.) This approach, akin to film editing's "dangling causes" (unresolved elements bridging sequential scenes), allowed flexible rearrangement during production. The album's material underwent daily revisions and rearrangements; Anderle recalled instances where sections from "Cabin Essence" were repurposed into tracks like "Vega-Tables", leading him to "beg Brian not to change a piece of music because it was too fantastic".

"Heroes and Villains" (February 1967 mix)
Excerpt from a discarded version of "Heroes and Villains". One of the distinguishing features of Smile was its abrupt jumpcuts.

The work drew from pop culture elements that many 1960s rock musicians had viewed as antiquated, including doo-wop, barbershop, ragtime, exotica, cowboy film motifs, and pre-rock 'n' roll pop. According to Parks, Smile was intended as a distinctly American testament of belief, a purpose he felt was best achieved by deliberately opposing prevailing countercultural trends. He acknowledged that he and Wilson had incorporated elements of musique concrète; tape jumpcuts were used as deliberate compositional tools, and the abrupt effect it created effectively broke what Heiser terms "the audio 'fourth wall'". (Note: Heiser additionally likened the modular approach to the nonlinear logic of childhood play and an engagement with avant-garde technique.) The material also incorporated jazz, classical tone poems, yodeling, cartoon sound effects, Sacred Harp singing, Shaker hymns, Native American chants, and Hawaiian mele. Wilson later stated his intent to avoid conventional rock instrumentation in favor of original approaches, and, in a late 1966 NME article, was quoted in reference to the forthcoming album, "I'd call it contemporary American music, not rock 'n' roll. Rock 'n' roll is such a worn out phrase. It's just contemporary American." He additionally reconfigured older songs—"Gee", "I Wanna Be Around", "The Old Master Painter", and "You Are My Sunshine".

Wilson, in 2004, felt that Smile transcended pop conventions, crediting Bach's use of simple forms to build intricate compositions as an inspiration. Citing Smile as an example of "a large-scale choral work on sacred or historical themes", musicologist Daniel Harrison categorized the collection of songs as an oratorio, with only portions aligning with a pop LP. Toop identified a range of "contradictory templates" embedded within its "music legacy" as well as parallels between Miles Davis and Gil Evans' collaborations and the atmosphere of tracks like "Look" and "Child Is Father of the Man", while comparing the album's acoustic experimentation to Charles Ives' avant-garde techniques, Les Baxter's thematic LPs, and Richard Maxfield's electronic experiments. (Note: The "contradictory templates" Toop cited were Frank Sinatra, the Lettermen, the Four Freshmen, Martin Denny, Patti Page, Chuck Berry, Spike Jones, Nelson Riddle, Jackie Gleason, Phil Spector, Bob Dylan, the Penguins, and the Mills Brothers.) Toop further suggested that Smile's structure could be interpreted as a series of tone poems indirectly related to the principles of Third Stream, a notion reminiscent of Charles Mingus's term "jazzical".

While tracks such as "Heroes and Villains" and "Surf's Up" approached traditional verse-chorus frameworks, others were shorter vignettes, and due to the fragmented, incomplete nature of the recordings, the boundaries between individual songs remain ambiguously defined. The mid-1960s tape-editing process required physically cutting and splicing reels, a method that proved unsustainable for compiling a full-length album. Mark Linett, who engineered Wilson's recordings after the 1980s, argued Wilson's modular approach exceeded the limitations of pre-digital technology, given the "infinite" permutations for assembling fragments. Brother Records archive manager Alan Boyd concurred, calling it "probably an unbearably arduous, difficult and tedious task".

=== Orchestrations and musical architecture ===
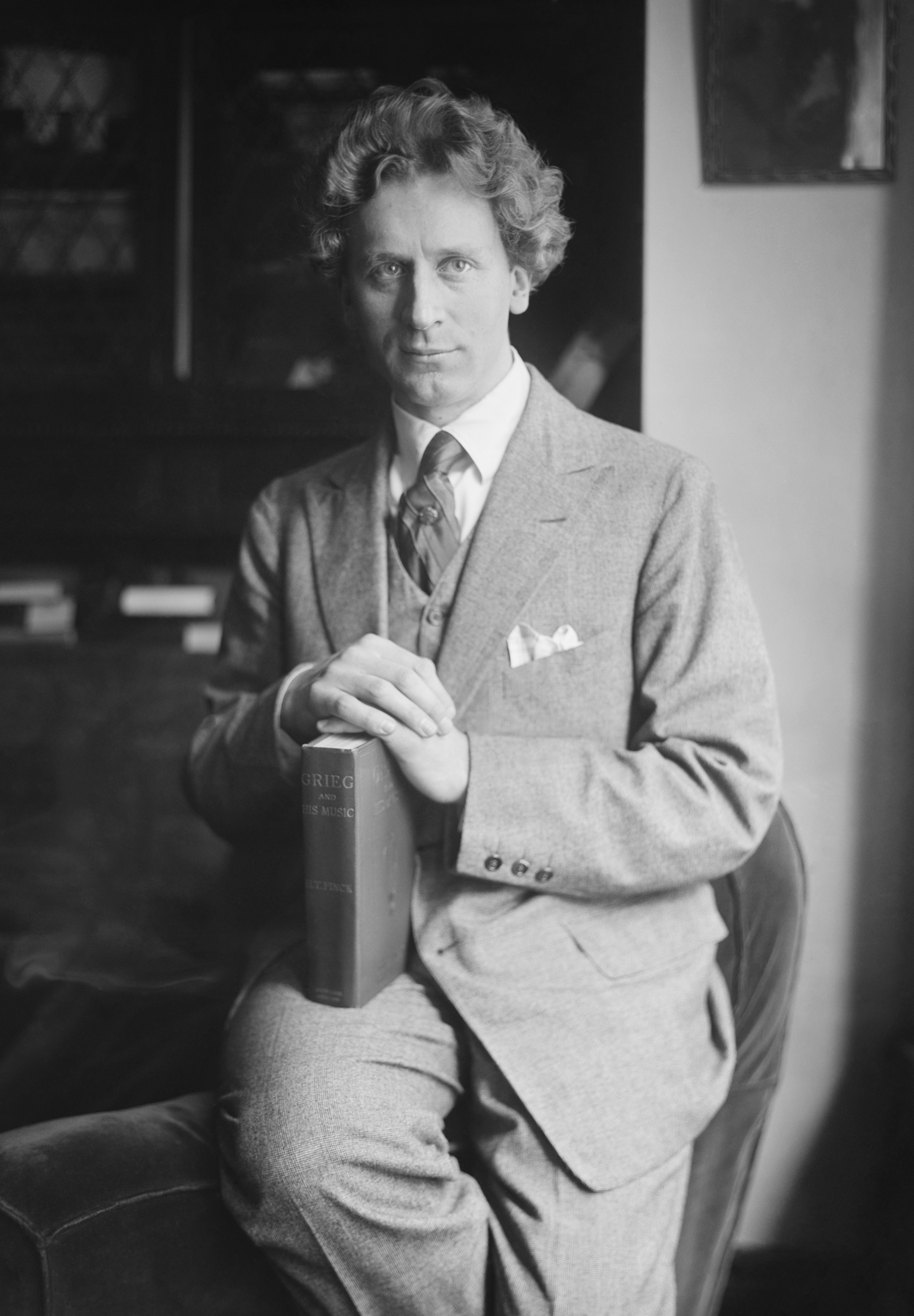
Parks compared Wilson's use of melodic percussive parts to the orchestrations of Percy Grainger.

Matching the harmonic sophistication present in Pet Sounds, Smile extended Wilson's orchestral approach with larger focus on traditional American instruments like banjo, steel guitar, and tack piano in addition to textures such as a piano with muted strings, tic-tac bass, bass harmonica, and bouzouki. Al Jardine described the music as increasingly textural and vocally dynamic, with "esoteric chord changes" and discrete movements requiring distinct sessions: "Each movement had its own texture." While Pet Sounds introduced rhythmic experimentation distinct from the Beach Boys' earlier work, Smile amplified this complexity. Harpsichords and tack piano, typically played in unison, are prominent alongside mallets and unconventional percussion. Parks recalled being impressed in the studio by Wilson's use of "tuneful percussion", which he associated with early 20th-century orchestrations such as Percy Grainger's "Country Gardens". (Note: Examples of Wilson's "uninhibited inventiveness", according to Heiser, include the "Doing, doing" backing vocals evoking banjos in the "Home on the Range" section of "Cabin Essence", French horns mimicking laughter in the first movement of "Surf's Up", and the sound of celery crunching rhythmically in "Vega-Tables". Author Domenic Priore described a "flair for exotica" in tracks like "Holidays", "Wind Chimes", "Love to Say Dada", and "Child Is Father of the Man", while Heiser likened the album's consistently "playful" and "colorful" moods to the music of Sesame Street.)

The album's vocal arrangements employed varied pitch centers, antiphonal exchanges, rhythmic shifts, cyclical repetitions, contrasts between legato and staccato phrasing, and other effects uncommon in mid-1960s rock. Musician Brian Torff identified choral-style arrangements and a rhapsodic Broadway influence, while Toop characterized some vocals as regressing into "baby talk". According to Williams, the songwriters had favored phonetic texture over literal meaning, an approach Freaky Trigger likened to experimental artists like Sun Ra and John Cage. The journal's contributor framed this as an avant-garde reworking of doo-wop, a style formative among the group's influences.

"Bicycle Rider" theme from "Do You Like Worms?" (recorded January 1967)
A simple rhythmic and melodic theme referred to as "Bicycle Rider" served as a recurring motif on Smile. It was later reworked into the chorus of "Heroes and Villains".

Contrasting the musical architecture of Smile with Pet Sounds, musicologist Philip Lambert writes that the latter achieved unity through subtle harmonic and melodic parallels between tracks, while Smile relied on overt thematic variations interwoven into a continuous narrative. It also integrated recurring harmonic elements such as the "bicycle rider" motif, recurring in evolving forms to establish cohesion, a four-note motif resembling the "How Dry I Am" melody (scale degrees 5–1–2–3,) and shared chord progressions across songs. (Note: The "How Dry I Am" motif appears in tracks such as "He Gives Speeches", "Look", and the "Cantina" section of "Heroes and Villains", transposed to different keys, altered rhythmically, and paired with reverse-order countermelodies (3–2–1–5). "Wind Chimes" embellishes the same scale steps with decorative melodic figures.) In discussing its "musical language", he referred to Gershwin's Rhapsody in Blue as a structural model, particularly its thematic development and use of variation; Wilson adopted variation as a central structural device for Smile, expanding from earlier Beach Boys songs like "Fun, Fun, Fun" (1964), which modified verses through layered vocals and arrangements. Williams writes that the motif eroded traditional song distinctions, eschewing the narrative coherence typical of rock opera, a term Wilson later adopted for the work.

== Tracks ==
=== Listed on Wilson's late-1966 note ===
By November 1966, Wilson had declared Smile would feature "Good Vibrations", "Heroes and Villains", and ten other tracks, incorporating both musical and spoken humor. He clarified it was not a comedy album, with spoken elements limited to brief interjections between verses rather than standalone tracks. On December 15, he submitted a handwritten provisional track list to Capitol to address delays in the album's release. (Note: The list had "Do You Like Worms?", "Wind Chimes", "Heroes and Villains", "Surf's Up", "Good Vibrations", "Cabin Essence", "Wonderful", "I'm in Great Shape", "Child Is Father of the Man", "The Elements", and "The Old Master Painter.) The label produced sleeves listing "Good Vibrations", "Heroes and Villains", and ten other tracks with the notation "see label for correct playing order", while preliminary mixes were created for multiple songs.

"Heroes and Villains" marked Wilson's first collaboration with Parks. Wilson envisioned the track as a three‐minute musical comedy intended to surpass "Good Vibrations" and produced versions lasting six to eight minutes. He selected the title and linked the melody to the Old West, which reminded Parks of Marty Robbins' "El Paso" (1959). Parks promptly devised the opening line: "I've been in this town so long that back in the city I've been taken for lost and gone and unknown for a long, long time." This collaboration spurred additional Old West–themed songs, including "Barnyard" and "I'm in Great Shape". On November 4, 1966, Wilson recorded a piano demonstration of "Heroes and Villains" incorporating sections of "I'm in Great Shape" and "Barnyard", although the December note listed "I'm in Great Shape" as a separate track. Vosse recalled that "Barnyard" had evolved from an impromptu piano reinterpretation of "You Are My Sunshine" that sparked Wilson's concept for a rustic barnyard aesthetic. Wilson recorded a short medley, sometimes called "My Only Sunshine", that bridged "The Old Master Painter" with "You Are My Sunshine", with Dennis Wilson singing lead on the latter. (Note: In January 1967, its closing section was adapted for "Heroes and Villains", excluding the "when skies are gray" vocal line. In 2005, Brian attributed the brief runtime of "The Old Master Painter" to his incomplete recollection of the song.) In 1978, Wilson told biographer Byron Preiss about an uncompleted "Barnyard Suite" of four brief pieces.

"Surf's Up" (1971 Surf's Up version)
A later composite version of "Surf's Up", with Carl Wilson overdubbing a lead vocal where original recordings lacked one.

"Surf's Up" was Wilson and Parks' second collaboration, composed primarily in one night while under the influence of Desbutal. Wilson referenced the song's atypical minor-seventh opening chord progression and its title, unrelated to surfing, stating: "from there it just started building and rambling". Vosse, writing in 1969, described it as the intended climactic finale of Smile, preceded by a "choral amen" segment. "Child Is Father of the Man" blends keyboards, trumpet, vocal rounds, and reverberant guitar drones. Parks stated the title, borrowed from William Wordsworth's "My Heart Leaps Up", reflected Wilson's aspiration to redefine his identity beyond youth. (Note: Parks later said that other unrecorded lyrics had been written for the song. He revised the song with new text in 2003.)

"Cabinessence" (1968 20/20 version)
"Cabinessence" is described by MOJO as "Smile in microcosm", Jardine remembered, "a lot of challenging vocal exercises and movements in that one. But we enjoyed those challenges."

"Cabin Essence" addresses railroad themes; biographer Jon Stebbins characterized the track as containing a waltz-like chorus with percussive effects resembling rail spikes and "some of the most haunting, manic, evil-sounding music the Beach Boys ever made". "Do You Like Worms?" explores themes of American recolonization, though its extant lyrics do not reference worms (Note: Its keyboard melody was repurposed for "Heroes and Villains" after January 1967, and the track was retitled "Roll Plymouth Rock" in 2003.)

Marilyn recalled that Wilson composed "Wind Chimes" after observing wind chimes they had purchased and hung outside their home. (Note: In July 1967, its bass line was adapted for "Can't Wait Too Long".) "Wonderful" similarly derived from Wilson's nickname for Marilyn. Parks described the music as distinct from their other work, leading him to conceive a love song with "boy/girl" lyrics. Three incomplete arrangements were recorded between August and December 1966. Wilson, in 1967, described "Vega-Tables" as promoting healthy eating with humor to avoid being "pompous about it". The track marked Parks' final co-writing contribution to the album. (Note: A module titled "Do a Lot" or "Sleep a Lot", associated with "Vega-Tables" and initially recorded during "Heroes and Villains" sessions, later evolved into the standalone "Mama Says" in 1967.)

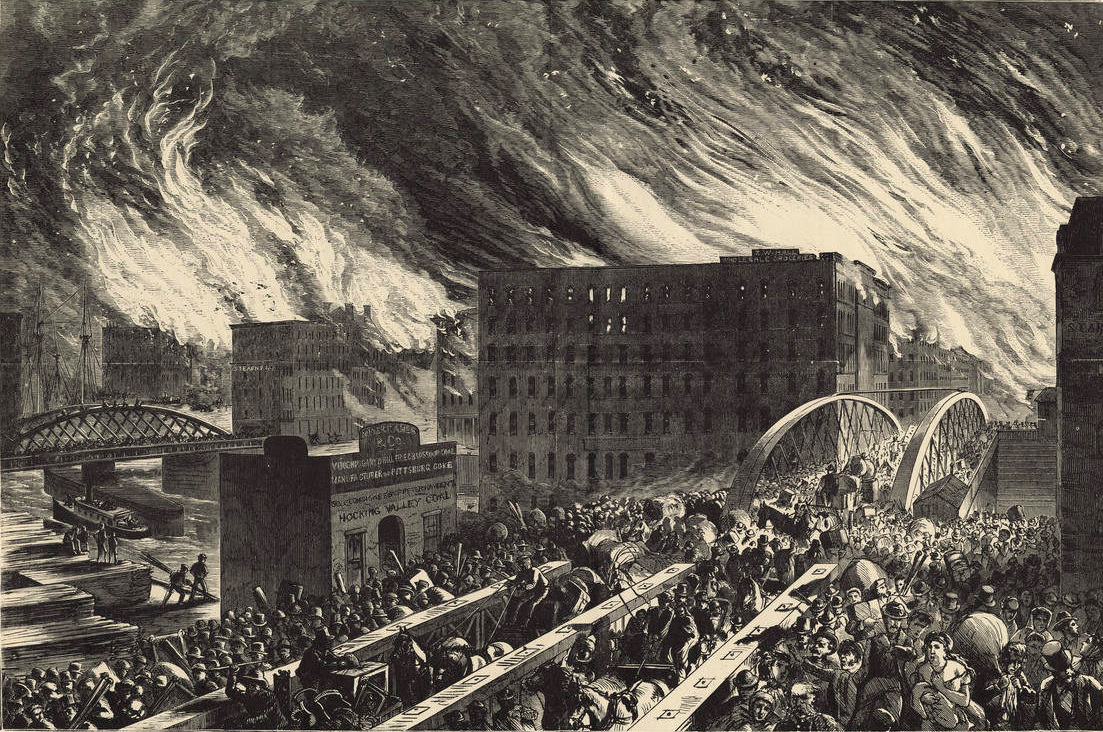
Artist's rendering of the Great Chicago Fire of 1871, an event which "Fire" was based on

"The Elements" was conceived as a four-part suite structured around the classical elements: Fire, Water, Air, and Earth. Anderle recounted Wilson's immersion in natural environments to inspire the work, including trips to Big Sur, mountains, beaches, and water sources. To capture water sounds for the project, Wilson tasked collaborators with using a Nagra tape recorder. Vosse recalled, "I'd come by to see him every day, and he'd listen to my tapes and talk about them. [...] And I had no idea what he was listening for!" The "Fire" segment (also known as "Mrs. O'Leary's Cow" and "The Elements – Part 1") involved unusual studio conditions where participants wore toy fire helmets and burned wood for ambiance, with crackling sounds mixed into the track.

Anderle stated that while Wilson outlined concepts for fire, water, and air, the group lacked a cohesive structure beyond viewing it as operatic. Parks recalled the elemental theme emerged later in production. Early album artwork grouped "Vega-Tables" under "The Elements", though Wilson's note listed them separately alongside "Wind Chimes". In 1978, Wilson stated that "Air" remained an unfinished piano piece.

=== Remaining tracks ===
"Our Prayer", a wordless hymn intended as the album's opener, was distinguished by Lambert as "every technique of chromatic harmony [Wilson] had ever heard or imagined." Session tapes capture Wilson designating the album's introduction, dismissing Jardine's suggestion to treat it as a standalone track. It remains the only track with confirmed placement.

"I Wanna Be Around", a cover of the Sadie Vimmerstedt and Johnny Mercer standard, was recorded post-"Fire" sessions alongside the intended segue piece "Friday Night". During the session, Wilson directed musicians to simulate construction sounds (sawing, drilling) using tools, resulting in a recording known as "Workshop", "Woodshop", or "The Woodshop Song". (Note: "Workshop" was later reworked into the album mix of "Do It Again" (1968).) Wilson's conceptualization of the track and its noises ("Workshop") symbolized a "rebuilding after the fire", according to Priore, suggesting that the track might have been placed in sequence after "Fire".

"I Ran" (alternately titled "Look") shares melodic elements with "Good Vibrations" and features upright bass, vibraphones, brass, and keyboards. Vocals recorded in October 1966 were lost. (Note: Parks later revised it as "Song for Children" in 2003.) "He Gives Speeches" was a minor fragment that, according to Lambert, served as a thematic variation on Wilson's recent material, designed to interlink tracks through "cross-references" for the developing concept album. (Note: It was reworked into "She's Goin' Bald" by July 1967.) "You're Welcome" is a reverb-drenched vocal chant. (Note: It served as the B-side to the 1967 "Heroes and Villains" single.) "Love to Say Dada", according to Preiss, formed part of the water-themed section of "The Elements" and was "briefly considered" to be paired with "Surf's Up". (Note: Alternatively titled "All Day", it evolved into "Cool, Cool Water" in mid-1967 and was retitled "In Blue Hawaii" in 2003 with new lyrics by Parks.)

The instrumental "Holidays" was sometimes mislabeled on bootlegs as "Tones" or "Tune X". (Note: Its marimba finale was repurposed for the Smiley Smile version of "Wind Chimes". Retitled "On a Holiday" in 2003, it received new lyrics.) In early 1967, Carl and Dennis Wilson recorded individually written pieces: Dennis' "I Don't Know" on January 12 and Carl's "Tune X" (later "Tones") on March 3 and 31. Badman speculated these recordings may have been intended either to transform Smile into a group effort rather than a Brian solo project or simply to allow Carl and Dennis to test their production skills.

=== "Psycodelic Sounds" and other recordings ===
Brian was consumed with humor at the time and the importance of humor. He was fascinated with the idea of getting humor onto a disc and how to get that disc out to the people.

— David Anderle

Compiled under the title "Psycodelic Sounds" [sic], Wilson conducted numerous sessions focused on capturing "humorous" situations. This resulted in hours of recordings created with his friends while they chanted, played games, staged mock arguments, or engaged in casual conversation, described by biographer Peter Ames Carlin as "just like the old days with his Wollensak recorder, except much, much weirder." His bandmates were absent from these sessions. (Note: Wilson had previously incorporated lighthearted spoken-word interludes and comedic tracks such as "'Cassius' Love vs. 'Sonny' Wilson" (1964) and "I'm Bugged at My Ol' Man" (1965) on earlier Beach Boys albums, typically as filler material.)

A collection of tapes with titles such as "Basketball", "Chewing Terry's", "Kid at Fairfax", "Tea Pot", and "Water Hose" were recorded on October 4, 1966. Recordings from the "Psycodelic Sounds" experiments included sound effects such as exaggerated breathing, moans, and laughter, and pronounced echo effects. An audio vérité segment titled "Bob Gordon's Real Trip" initially presents a routine conversation with a Chicago taxi driver, which abruptly transitions into surreal audio manipulation as the driver's voice becomes heavily drenched in spring reverb.

One 24-minute exercise, recorded on October 18, featured Wilson, his sister-in-law Diane Rovell, Parks, Anderle, Vosse, Siegel, and a woman named Dawn. Siegel initiates the party game Lifeboat, where participants roleplay shipwreck survivors debating whom to sacrifice. Tensions escalate, culminating in Wilson lamenting, "I feel so depressed. [...] I'm too down to smile." Another session (November 4, 1966) included Wilson, Parks, Hutton, Vosse, and a participant named Bob ordering from a psychedelic ice cream van playing a piano-simulated music box version of "Good Vibrations". Wilson initiated a comedic routine about falling into a piano and microphone, followed by group chants of phrases like "Where's my beets and carrots?" and "I've got a big bag of vegetables" over bongo rhythms. Parks later reflected on withdrawing from such interactions, perceiving them as "destructive". On November 16, Wilson staged arguments between Vosse and studio drummer Hal Blaine, a recording reportedly intended for potential inclusion in the "Vegetables" track.

Early in 1967, Wilson recorded a series of novelty songs with photographer Jasper Daily: "Teeter Totter Love", "Crack the Whip", and "When I Get Mad I Just Play My Drums". (Note: Mike Love called "Teeter Totter Love" "simple but poignant.") The AFM contracts for these tracks list "Brother Records" as the employer. These recordings were intended to fulfill Wilson's separate "humor album" concept, according to Gaines.

== Artwork and packaging ==
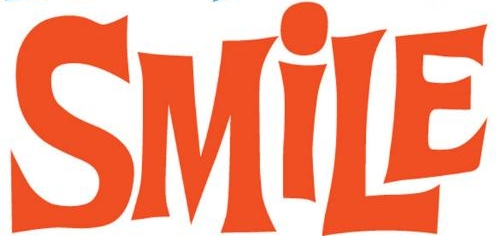
The Smile logo displayed on the original cover art

Capitol assigned Smile the catalog number DT2580 and produced at least two slightly varied album jackets. The album was to include cover artwork and a booklet of pen-and-ink drawings by graphic artist Frank Holmes, a friend of Parks. Holmes met with Wilson and Parks around June 1966, basing his work on lyric sheets provided by them, and completed his contributions by October. (Note: The pieces he created were titled "My Vega-tables" / "The Elements" (based on "Vega-Tables"); "Do You Like Worms"; "Two-step to lamps light" / "Surf's Up"; "Diamond necklace play the pawn" (based on "Surf's Up"); "Lost and found you still remain there" (based on "Cabin Essence"); "The rain of bullets eventually brought her down" (based on "Heroes and Villains"); and "Uncover the cornfield" / "Home on the Range" (based on "Cabin Essence").) Parks felt that Holmes' illustrations profoundly influenced the project, serving as the album's "third equation" and framing its creative direction in cartoon terms.

Holmes based the cover on an abandoned jewelry store near his Pasadena home. regarding the storefront as "something that would be pulling you into the world of Smile". The cover features a husband and wife rendered in an early-Americana, 19th-century style. According to Vosse, the smile shop idea had derived from Wilson's "humor album" concept, and "everybody who knew anything about graphics, and about art, thought that the cover was not terribly well done [...] but Brian knew better". Parks felt that Holmes, expected to create a "light-hearted" design with no specific instructions, ultimately provided an effective visual framework for the project and viewed his work as a fundamental aspect of its identity: "I think of Smile in visual terms".

Wilson approved the design and submitted it to Capitol. In September 1966, Capitol began production on a normal cover (not gatefold as has sometimes been claimed) with a 12‑page booklet featuring color photographs from a November 7 Beach Boys photoshoot in Boston by Guy Webster, alongside Holmes' illustrations. In early 1967, the cover was modified to include repeated instances of "Good Vibrations", absent from Holmes' original design. The back cover displayed a monochrome photograph of the band without Brian, framed by astrological symbols. Capitol produced 466,000 copies of the record sleeve and 419,200 copies of the booklet, which were ultimately stored in a Pennsylvania warehouse until the 1990s.

== Initial recording sessions and promotion ==
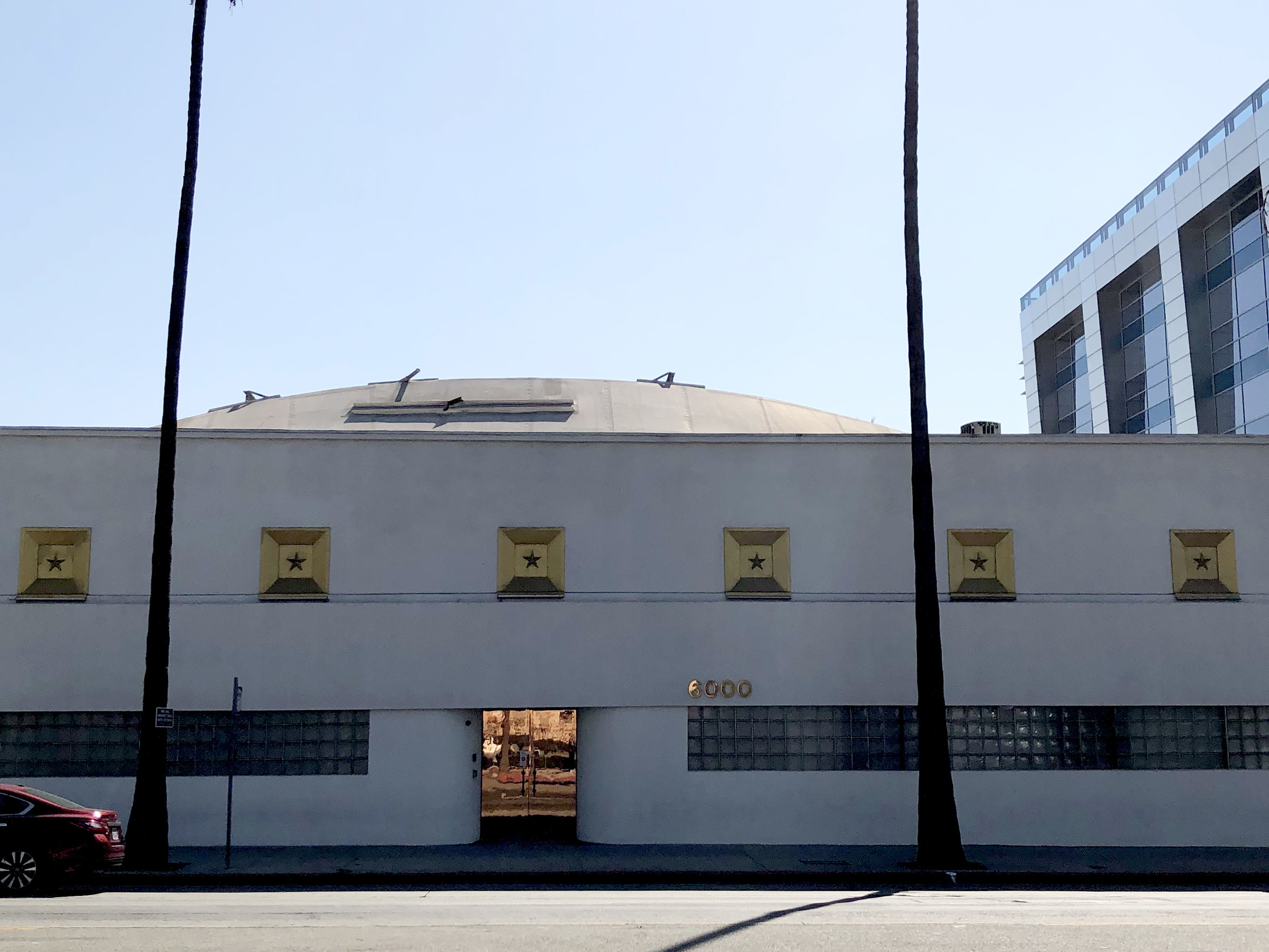
Most of the Smile sessions were conducted at Western Studio on Sunset Boulevard (pictured 2019)

On May 11, 1966, Wilson recorded a demo instrumental take of "Heroes and Villains" at Gold Star Studios. He returned on August 3 to record "Wind Chimes", marking the unofficial start of the album sessions. (Note: Badman writes that the sessions were formally inaugurated on September 8 with "Holidays".) Over 80 sessions occurred in the subsequent ten months. "Good Vibrations" was completed on September 21 and recording had begun for "Look", "Wonderful", "Holidays", "He Gives Speeches", and "Our Prayer" by the end of September. Work on "Cabin Essence", "Do You Like Worms?", "Vega-Tables", "Barnyard", "I'm in Great Shape", and "Child Is Father of the Man" followed in October.

"Good Vibrations" was issued as a single on October 15, becoming the group's third U.S. number-one hit by topping the Billboard Hot 100 in December and marking their first number one in Britain. Initially slated for a December release, Smile became one of the most-discussed albums in the rock press; Taylor continued to write articles for music publications, sometimes anonymously, in an effort to further speculation. Nolan, writing in Los Angeles Times West Magazine, called Wilson "the seeming leader of a potentially-revolutionary movement in pop music". Wilson informed Melody Maker that Smile would "be as much an improvement over [Pet] Sounds" as that album had been over Summer Days (And Summer Nights!!) (1965). Dennis remarked in Hit Parader, "In my opinion, it makes Pet Sounds stink. That's how good it is."

In November, the sessions saw the first recordings of "Surf's Up", "My Only Sunshine", and "The Elements", while December sessions introduced "You're Welcome" and "Love to Say Dada" (then titled "Da-Da"). In December, Capitol promoted the album with a Billboard ad proclaiming, "Good Vibrations. Number One in England. Coming soon with the 'Good Vibrations' sound. Smile. The Beach Boys." This was followed by a TeenSet color ad declaring "Look! Listen! Vibrate! SMiLE!" The ad promised "Good Vibrations" alongside "other new and fantastic Beach Boys songs", as well as "an exciting full-color sketch-book look inside the world of Brian Wilson!" Record stores featured cardboard displays of the cover, and Capitol circulated a promotional ad for employees that used "Good Vibrations" as a backdrop for a voice-over stating, "With a happy album cover, the really happy sounds inside, and a happy in-store display piece, you can't miss! We're sure to sell a million units... in January!"

The Beach Boys' album Smile and single "Heroes And Villains" will make them the greatest group in the world. We predict they'll take over where The Beatles left off.

— Hit Parader, December 1966

In the UK, a headline claimed that the Beach Boys' British distributor EMI Records were giving the band the "biggest campaign since the Beatles". On December 10, NME published a reader's poll that ranked Wilson fourth among "World Music Personalities", about 1,000 votes ahead of Bob Dylan and 500 behind John Lennon. The Beach Boys were also voted the top "vocal group", ahead of the Beatles, the Walker Brothers, the Rolling Stones, and the Four Tops. (Note: Billboard suggested this result was influenced by the success of "Good Vibrations" and the band's recent UK tour, noting that while the Beatles lacked a recent single and tour that year, "The sensational success of the Beach Boys [...] is being taken as a portent that the popularity of the top British groups of the last three years is past its peak." Ringo Starr commented, "We haven't been doing much and it was run just at a time when the Beach Boys had something good out. We're all four fans of the Beach Boys. Maybe we voted for them." Music historian Luis Sanchez writes that Wilson seemed "poised" to join the Beatles and Dylan among pop luminaries, yet over time, the public anticipation for Smile shifted from high expectations to "doubt" and "bemusement".) On December 17, KRLA Beat published a nonsense article by Wilson titled "Vibrations – Brian Wilson Style", filled with in-jokes about his associates. (Note: The article discussed the "energy" between himself ("Gemini"), Anderle ("the Jolly Jewish Carrot"), and Vosse ("Michael Spinach", "the Green Glob", or "Sidney"), as well as Guy Webster, Hal Blaine, and possibly Siegel (referred to as "celery"). In one excerpt, Wilson wrote, "Grasping firmly onto the carrot, Brian ate it quickly, and, lo and behold! – it gave him some very out-of-sight vision, of a very out-of-sight world. ")

== Collapse ==
=== Criticism from Wilson's bandmates (1966–1967) ===
Corporate pressures, technical difficulties, internal conflicts, legal stalling, and Wilson's deteriorating mental health led to the shelving of Smile. After months of work, Wilson determined that its esoteric nature would not appeal to the public and opted to produce simpler music. According to Carl, Brian felt unable to complete the album and feared a negative public response. In Brian's words, the band was "too selfishly artistic" and had not sufficiently considered the public.

Writers often theorize that the album was cancelled because Wilson's bandmates had failed to appreciate its music. However, Stebbins contends that this view is "overly simplistic and mostly wrong", with not enough consideration for Wilson's psychological decline. Carl, Dennis, and Al Jardine contributed instrumentally to several tracking sessions, with Carl participating more extensively than any other member aside from Brian, although Stebbins notes, "Even Carl was unhappy with the project". Derek Taylor recalled that despite Wilson's erratic mood swings, his bandmates were generally supportive; he also felt that Wilson was insecure and highly sensitive to criticism, frequently seeking others' opinions on his work. Journalist Tracy Thomas, who attended sessions around January 1967, reported in the NME that Brian's "dedication to perfection does not always endear him to his fellow Beach Boys, nor their wives, nor their next door neighbours, with whom they were to have dinner [...] But when the finished product is 'Good Vibrations' or Pet Sounds or Smile they hold back their complaints."

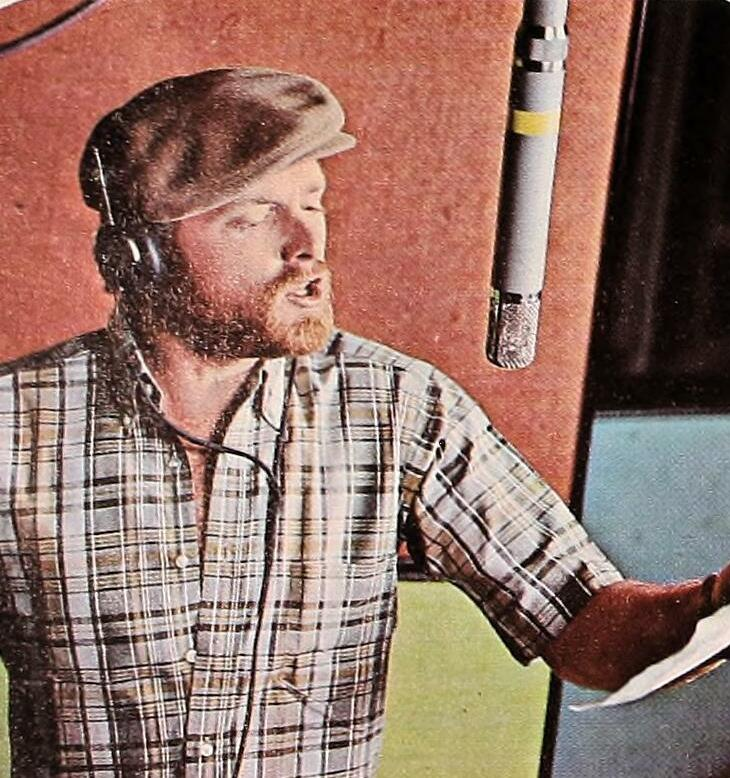
Mike Love (pictured 1966) was often blamed for the album's collapse, a characterization that he and some commentators have disputed.

It is often suggested that Mike Love was chiefly responsible for the project's collapse. Love dismissed these accusations as hyperbolic, contending that his vocal opposition to Wilson's drug suppliers instigated claims that he, along with other band members and Wilson's family, sabotaged the project. Wilson's remarks on the matter have been inconsistent, as he has both affirmed and denied that his confidence in the project was undermined by Love.

Addressing the claim that he had hastened the project's collapse by criticizing the work, Love acknowledged that Wilson, under the influence of psychoactive drugs, might have become overly sensitive to "body language" and attitudes. However, Love rejected the notion that he should "be held responsible" for his cousin's drug-induced paranoia and impaired mental condition, a subject that was little understood at the time. In author Clinton Heylin's estimation, some reports suggest that Wilson became dissatisfied with Parks' lyrics, although Love "certainly" contributed to Wilson's change of opinion. Mark Volman recalled, "I liked Mike a lot ... he had a good sense of humor about it all, even though he'd say one thing to Brian, and then kind of turn around and go, 'This is nuts. This is crazy stuff.' And he had an opinion on everything that Brian was doing, and it wasn't good."

Parks sometimes stated that he was dismissed from the project at Love's behest, but in a 2004 interview declared, "It's not because of Mike Love that I walked away. It was because of my own irrelevance that I walked away. There were too many things conspiring against the record [...] I felt like an intruder". (Note: In a 1974 interview, he said that he both "resigned" and "was fired" after Love and "the least known members" had decided that his lyrics were "indecipherable and unnecessary". Two years later, when interviewed for the 1976 television special The Beach Boys: It's OK!, he indicated that he had suggested discarding his lyrics after Love inquired about a particular line.) He elaborated that this feeling emerged after receiving threats of physical violence from an unnamed party envious of his role as Wilson's songwriting partner. (Note: In a 2013 interview, Parks said that he "walked away from the job" to escape Wilson's "buffoonery" and Love's "jealousy". While lamenting his bandmates' drug use during the album's recording in a 2014 interview, Love commented, "I had literally nothing to do on anything on the Smile album, so naturally I was a little upset.") On another occasion, he stated that he had preferred to withdraw from what he viewed as unrelated family feuds and thought at the time that Smile could have been completed without his involvement.

=== Drug use, Wilson's mental state and perfectionism (1966–1967) ===
[Brian would go] after take after – a monotony of repeated takes – to get a performance that fell by the wayside because of maybe one eighth note [...] He was his own worst critic, and everybody suffered in the process.

— Van Dyke Parks

Wilson's uncompromising perfectionism, which may have been intensified by his drug use, was a major issue that contributed to the project's collapse. At one Smile session, Wilson's repeated calls for retakes elicited a horn player to sarcastically remark, "Perfect – just one more". At the end of another session, which had extended until dawn, an engineer asked Wilson's wife if she believed he would be satisfied with the final take, to which she replied, "No, when he gets home he won't be satisfied. He's never satisfied." Wilson was later diagnosed with bipolar and schizoaffective disorders, although most associates observed no signs of mental illness during the early Smile sessions.

To prepare for the album's writing and recording, he had purchased about two thousand dollars' worth of marijuana and hashish (equivalent to $20,000 in 2025) and built a $30,000 hotboxing tent ($298,000) in his former dining room. He installed a sandbox under the grand piano in his den and, after developing an interest in health and fitness, replaced his living room furniture with gym mats. (Note: Marilyn vetoed his suggestion to sell organic vegetables from a drive-through window at the rear of their home. Mike Love recalled that "it was strange" when Wilson had eight tons of sand poured into his living room in order to simulate composing at a beach, given that "Brian didn't like the beach.") Musician and television producer David Oppenheim, who briefly visited in late 1966, described Wilson's home as "a playpen of irresponsible people" and "a strange, insulated household, insulated from the world by money". (Note: Vosse, speaking in 2004, maintained that the tent had generated enthusiasm rather than signaling widespread disapproval of Wilson's conduct. He recalled that Wilson's eccentricities were comparable to those of many in show business, and behaviors later deemed alarming were not initially concerning. Anderle reflected that Wilson was not uniquely strange, and that they all engaged in unusual conduct.) The sandbox remained in Wilson's home until April 1967.

The music was cool but it's always tinged with the reality of making it. Brian degraded us, made us lay down for hours and make barnyard noises, demoralized us, freaked out. I can't tell you a lot of it, it's really fucked up. He thought it was hilarious, he was stoned and laughing.

— Bruce Johnston, 1993

Carl recalled that completing the album would have required considerable "willingness and perseverance to corral all of us", as everyone "was so loaded on pot and hash all of the time that it's no wonder the project didn't get done." Love acknowledged his own marijuana and alcohol use during the sessions but maintained that his work, along with Dennis and Carl's, remained unaffected. Dennis, who also used LSD, remembered that the group grew "very paranoid" about losing their audience, adding that while drugs significantly influenced their evolution, they also fostered a fear that the public "would no longer understand us, musically." Brian told an interviewer in 1976: "We were too fucking high, you know, to complete the stuff. We were stoned! You know, stoned on hash 'n' shit!" Jardine, who did not use drugs, compared his position to "being trapped in an insane asylum", citing an incident during a "Heroes and Villains" session when Brian instructed the band to crawl around the studio and mimic pig-snorting noises.

Parks later said that he was uninterested in both using psychedelics himself and "anything that would incapacitate" Wilson. Wilson used Desbutal, a combination of methedrine and a barbiturate, more frequently than LSD. (Note: Parks said that he never observed Wilson using psychedelics, stating in 2004 that "Brian was strongly against acid at that time". Anderle similarly reported never witnessing Wilson take psychedelics, while Vosse suggested that Wilson "may have taken LSD once".) Siegel later attributed Wilson's paranoid delusions, unusual behavior, and diminished artistic confidence to his Desbutal abuse, explaining that Wilson had suffered from "classic amphetamine psychosis" and that, while some aspects of his paranoia had a basis in reality, the amphetamine-induced euphoria and subsequent "crash" distorted his assessment of himself and his work. Conversely, Hutton felt that the use of amphetamines had merely "helped him work longer hours".

Upon study of the session tapes, Mark Linett reported that Wilson consistently had a cohesive rapport with musicians and developed studio arrangements swiftly. Oppenheim had been similarly impressed by Wilson's rapid workflow; however, Heiser writes that this flow ultimately extended to a "compulsive desire to have his every whim fulfilled, even outside of the studio, regardless of the time of day or the impracticality of his ideas." Taylor recalled struggling with such "temporary whims". Vosse maintained that despite the abundant marijuana available, Wilson "wasn't stoned all the time [...] really, Brian had a job to do, and he was a hard workin' guy." He dismissed drug use as "the biggest red herring in [his] story". Parks argued that the "athletic" productivity and discipline demonstrated during the project belied any hindrance ascribed to Wilson's marijuana use.

=== First signs of issues and resistance (November–December 1966) ===
Wilson began having increasing doubts about the project during late 1966. One evening, he declared to his associates that, based on his reading of the I Ching, the project was fated to collapse to enable everyone involved to pursue their own individual creative paths, recalled by Vosse as an abrupt shift in Wilson's attitude. His erratic direction and apparent detachment increasingly fostered resentment among the band members, unaware of his underlying struggles. According to Johnston, "We hated him then because we didn't really know what was happening to him." (Note: Johnston interpreted Wilson's actions as schadenfreude against the bandmates and felt Wilson, having endured belittling treatment from his father, "craved" approval, a need his associates exploited by "pump[ing] [his] ego to the ceiling".)

As far as lyrics are concerned you can put me down as saying I'm a stickler for words. More seriously you might say that we like to communicate. This incomprehensible freak-out scene is not for me.

— Mike Love, late-1966

From October 25 to November 14, his bandmates toured Europe—including their first UK dates—then undertook their fourth annual U.S. Thanksgiving tour from November 16 to 24. Vosse later wrote that Smile had been "a totally conceived entity" until the bandmates returned, after which the project "started going nuts". In Gaines' description, the bandmates, unaware of Wilson's "strange behavior", were "infuriated" to find Anderle leading a pack of outsiders who "had infiltrated and taken over the Beach Boys" while encouraging Wilson's eccentric conduct. Anderle commented, "I stand guilty on those counts [...] I was an interloper and I was definitely fueling his creativity. No holds barred. No rules."

Wilson had been accustomed to "everybody doing exactly what I told them to do" in the studio. His friends, family, and colleagues often date the unraveling of the project around the time he recorded "Fire" on November 28. Parks did not attend that session, later stating he avoided it "like the plague" because of what he saw as "regressive behavior" from Wilson. Within days, a building across the street burned down, and Wilson grew fearful that the music might have caused the fire through "witchcraft", prompting him to discard the track. He later attributed his decision to his use of marijuana and hashish and paused his drug use for two weeks. By then, tensions had emerged during the album recording, contrasting sharply with the project's early optimism. Anderle recalled that the collapse of "The Elements" coincided with mounting studio resistance—issues with engineers, securing studio time, and assigning parts "to one of the fellas or to a group of the fellas"—that became one of the greatest factors in the project's downfall. He said that Wilson regularly anticipated conflict before entering the studio.

Vosse, in 1969, recalled that during group vocal sessions, older members of the Wilson family actively undermined Brian's relationships with Parks, Anderle, and himself—motivated by suspicions of an imminent band breakup and disapproval of their appearances. He said that band publisher Murry, father of the Wilson brothers, had regarded "Good Vibrations" as a "horrible mistake" that would alienate the band's audience, igniting a "big argument" over preserving their established image or forging a new one. As internal schisms grew, Parks became the "most convenient" scapegoat due to his occasional disputes with Brian, according to Vosse. In Parks' recollection, "the whole house of cards began tumbling down" when Wilson summoned him to the studio to resolve a disagreement over the "Cabin Essence" lyric "over and over the crow cries uncover the cornfield". (Note: Love was confused by this line, suspecting the song referenced drugs, and dismissed Parks' contributions as "acid alliteration". Parks offered no explanation and Love sang the lyric as written. Reflecting on the exchange, Love said he was not necessarily opposed to the words, nor did he sense any offense from Parks. Jardine recalled in a 2000 interview that Love often questioned Parks about a lyric's meaning, to which Parks would reply, "I don't know, I was high", prompting Love to remark, "That's disgusting. That doesn't make any sense." Brian supported in a 2011 interview that while it was his own choice to shelve the album, Love had told him, "I'm disgusted with this, this is nothing like [...] any kind of Beach Boys type song.")

Love, in a 1993 interview, stated that he had been deeply concerned about Wilson's treatment of "himself", "others", and "the reputation of the band", as well as the potential destruction of their "livelihoods". In 2015, he explained that while he had no issue with "crazy stupid sounds" or Wilson's strange requests, he wanted to produce "a commercially successful pop record", leading him to question the lyrics. (Note: Love later compared Parks' lyrics to the poetry of Lewis Caroll, "clever and subtle" but "inscrutable" for rock music, which conflicted with his own prioritization of broadly accessible songwriting aimed at mass audiences.) He had openly critiqued Wilson's work in the past, yet during the Smile sessions, "he was acting so strange, I couldn't have any conversation with him." The oft-attributed remark "don't fuck with the formula" was denied by Love, who later maintained that the Beach Boys "have no formula." (Note: The remark originates from a 1971 Rolling Stone magazine article, "The Beach Boys: A California Saga", written by Nolan. The relevant text stated, "Mike Love was the tough one for David. [...] David really holds Mike Love responsible for the collapse. Mike wanted the bread, 'and don't fuck with the formula.'" Over the ensuing decades, the quote has been repeated in myriad books, articles, websites, and blogs. In Leaf's 1978 biography, Anderle is quoted saying that the line had been "taken slightly out of context", and clarified that Love had actually agreed with Anderle on "a business level. [...] Artistically, it was another matter." In a 1998 deposition related to the memoir Wouldn't It Be Nice: My Own Story, Wilson testified that Love had never spoken the line to him.) According to Carl Wilson, Love's main objection was that the lyrics were overly abstract; however, Parks countered that his issue was with the music. (Note: Jardine, who praised Parks' lyrics and reported an initial struggle to accommodate the band's changing musical direction, contended that Love was "a formula hound" in that he typically dismissed songs that lacked clear, distinct hooks. In a 1968 interview, Anderle intimated that Wilson's bandmates feared that straying too far from their established sound would erode "what the Beach Boys are", preferring to maintain "a simple dumb thing" and "stay pretty much within the form of what [they] had created [...] whatever that is, California rock or whatever." Taylor stated in 1975 that the group's collective "stubbornness" was a "key factor" in the project's collapse through their "determination to [...] get back to the old accepted, dumb formulas".)

=== Delays, Capitol lawsuit, and departures (December 1966 – April 1967) ===
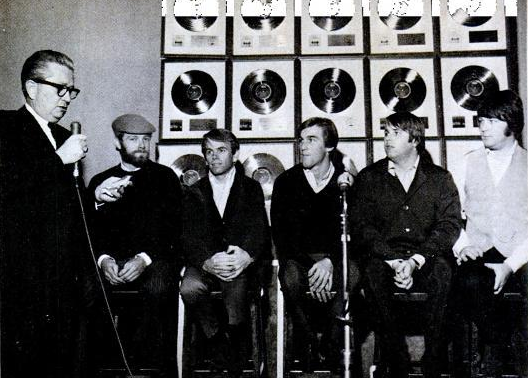
The Beach Boys accepting a record sales certification for Little Deuce Coupe, Shut Down Volume 2, and "Good Vibrations" at Capitol, December 1966.

Wilson's paranoid delusions and increasingly erratic behavior intensified throughout late 1966 and early 1967. One incident involved Anderle secretly painting Wilson's portrait; upon viewing it, Wilson believed it had literally captured his soul, irreparably altering their relationship. Murry hired a private investigator to surveil Brian after reading Tom Nolan's 1966 article in which he acknowledged using LSD and consequently escalated his paranoia into reciprocal surveillance between him and his father, described by Taylor as a cycle of "complete insanity". His inability to promptly follow up on "Good Vibrations" also became an escalating issue. On December 15, he informed Capitol A&R director Karl Engemann that the album and its lead single "Heroes and Villains" would likely be delivered "some time prior to January 15". Consequently, Capitol postponed their release until March 1967. Possibly pressured by Capitol's demand for a ready single, Wilson resumed work on "Heroes and Villains" on December 19, 1966, halting progress on other tracks until April 1967.

[...] it was just all hell breaking loose. It was tapes being lost, ideas being junked – Brian thinking, "I'm no good," then, "I'm too good" – then, "I can't sing!" I can't get those voices anymore. There was even a time back then when there hardly seemed to be a Beach Boys at all.

— Derek Taylor, 1975

While 1966 sessions had been methodically documented, Wilson often took unlabeled test acetates home, leaving them scattered without systematic archiving. By early 1967, session logs indicate increasingly lost studio tapes. In January, Carl received a draft notice from the U.S. Army while Brian missed his deadline and reduced his work on the album. "Good Vibrations" dropped from the top 20 chart positions after seven weeks in the top 10. Parks was offered a solo deal by Warner Bros. Records, and, upon signing it, became increasingly unavailable to Wilson, who grew uncertain about the album's direction. Anderle, in 1968, remembered that as "everything started to collapse", including the collaboration with Parks, Wilson "abandoned the studio" and subsequently retreated into "the business aspects of Brother Records", which lent more "excuses" to avoid recording. Wilson suspected that Capitol was withholding payments and ordered band manager Nick Grillo to audit the label's records, which confirmed irregularities.

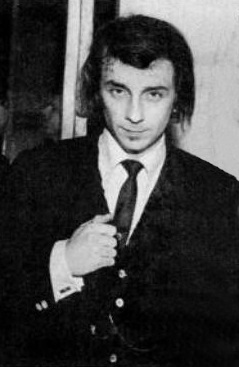
Wilson, struggling with paranoid delusions after watching the 1966 film Seconds, came to believe that he was being targeted by record producer Phil Spector.

In another incident, after attending a screening for Seconds, Wilson had thought the film contained coded messages from Phil Spector and director John Frankenheimer as part of a supposed Jewish conspiracy against him. (Note: Gaines writes that Anderle, himself Jewish, "was so insulted he couldn't speak. [...] It took him several days to forgive Brian.") He later described himself as "fucked up" and "jealous" of Spector and the Beatles, stating he began Smile intending to "beat the Beatles". Taylor recounted Wilson's "mad possessive battle" with the Beatles and Rolling Stones, saying Wilson demanded unwavering loyalty and often challenged him to compare his work favorably against theirs. (Note: Taylor described examples where Wilson would preview a new original song and remark, "Better than the Stones, yeah?" Wilson would then contrast his work with a track such as the Beatles' "Paperback Writer" and ask, "Is that really any good?" Taylor recalled repeatedly affirming the Beatles' work, though Wilson "was never satisfied". Anderle corroborated Wilson's insecurity over perceived competition: "Brian always felt that [...] the Beatles were number two [with Derek] [...] He had a very strong feeling about that.") Throughout early 1967, the music industry and pop fans were aware that the Beatles were working on a significant new work as their follow-up to Revolver, with the band having been ensconced in their London studios since the previous November. He first heard their February 1967 single "Strawberry Fields Forever" while under the influence of Seconal and driving with Vosse, who recalled Wilson remarking that the Beatles had achieved "what [he] wanted to do with Smile" before both laughed. (Note: It is sometimes suggested that Wilson was profoundly affected by "Strawberry Fields Forever". Responding to a fan's question on his website in 2014, Wilson rejected that hearing the song had "weakened" him. Vosse stated that he "never gave much import" to Wilson's remark, though "he sounded very serious" at the moment he spoke it. Historian Darren Reid surmised that Wilson believed releasing the first significant 1967 album would establish an industry benchmark, setting "the standard against which all other albums released after that time would have to be judged.")

On February 28, the band filed a lawsuit against Capitol for $250,000 in unpaid royalties (equivalent to $2.46 million in 2025) and sought to terminate their contract before its November 1969 expiration. Subsequently, he announced that "Vega-Tables" would be the album's lead single, but Parks opposed this decision, considering it one of their least representative songs. Parks struggled to accommodate his contributions to Wilson's increasingly "abstract" music and "the people around him and the crowded house it became [...] My ideas were less and less relevant, it seemed to me, or useful for his purposes." According to Anderle, tensions between the songwriters escalated post-February over creative differences; Wilson argued that Parks' lyrics were "too sophisticated, and in some areas Brian's music was not sophisticated enough [for Van Dyke]." (Note: Vosse recalled that Parks resented working in a subordinate role, "And every once in a while, [Brian] would say no just to let Van Dyke know he could say no: and that's what really made Van Dyke mad." Siegel said that Parks was "tired of being constantly dominated by Brian.")

On March 2, Wilson and Parks dissolved their partnership, an event sometimes seen as marking the end of the Smile era. (Note: Heylin states that the studio logs appear to indicate March 2 as the date that Smile was "abandoned".) Wilson, reliant on Parks' input, faced challenges assembling the fragmented recordings and struggled to integrate his own lyrics into Parks' existing work, halting the recording sessions. Amid ongoing litigation, the Smile tapes were relocated to engineer Armin Steiner's Sound Recorders studio, and Anderle's efforts to secure a distributor for Brother Records proved unsuccessful, with A&M Records rejecting the collection of songs produced for Jasper Daily. (Note: Vosse recalled that when Wilson presented "Crack the Whip" to A&M head Chuck Kaye, Kaye appeared visibly alarmed: "You could see the panic on [Kaye's] face when he heard how awful it was. This look of, 'What the fuck do I do?'") In March, Wilson canceled three sessions, including one due to perceived "bad vibrations", at a total cost of $3,000 (equivalent to $29,000 in 2025). A March 18 KMEM radio survey in San Bernardino reported Wilson "informed the Capitol bosses that he doesn't intend to 'hold back' on these projects", while KFXM reported delays to the single's release due to legal disputes on March 30. Parks briefly rejoined the project during a March 31 session.

In mid-1967, Wilson and his wife moved from Beverly Hills to a Bel Air mansion; according to Badman, this was to distance themselves from his entourage. Marilyn added security measures, including a brick wall and electronic gate, while Wilson began building a home studio. During an April "Vega-Tables" session, Paul McCartney, who had been staying with Taylor in Los Angeles, previewed his song "She's Leaving Home" for Wilson. Shortly after, Wilson learned of rumors that Taylor had shared Smile tapes with the Beatles. Parks recounted Wilson's attitude changing "completely", stating he felt "raped" and grew increasingly suspicious of his team's loyalties. (Note: Parks remembered the rumor being that two members of the Beatles had visited Steiner's studio to listen to unmixed Smile master tapes.) By April, much of Wilson's inner circle had departed. (Note: Vosse attributed Siegel's expulsion to Wilson's unfounded suspicion that Siegel's girlfriend disrupted his work via ESP. Siegel acknowledged, "Wilson didn't trust [anyone] anymore, [but] with some of them he had good reason." Vosse was fired in March after band members objected to funding his role as Wilson's exclusive aide.) Quoted in that month's issue of Tiger Beat, he said, "I feel like I've lost my talent. I'm working harder and getting less satisfaction than ever before." Anderle at that time felt that Parks' departure was "central" to the project's collapse. He also resigned within weeks, later reflecting that while Wilson "on many occasions" had considered disbanding the Beach Boys, severing ties with non-family collaborators proved simpler. During Anderle's final business meeting with Wilson, Wilson remained in his bedroom, refusing to engage.

=== Hiatus, Inside Pop premiere, and "scrapped" announcement (April – May 1967) ===
Parks' final involvement in the Smile recordings occurred during an April 14 "Vega-Tables" session, after which Wilson paused studio work for four weeks. CBS premiered the documentary Inside Pop: The Rock Revolution, produced by Oppenheim and co-hosted by Leonard Bernstein, on April 25. The film was initially planned to center on Wilson but broadened its focus as the Beach Boys' popularity declined in early 1967. Wilson's contribution comprised footage of him performing "Surf's Up" at the piano, devoid of interviews or mentions of Smile. He was disturbed by the praises he received via Oppenheim's voice-over, which accelerated the album's dissolution, according to Kent.

Carl, who three weeks earlier had been indicted on draft evasion charges, was arrested by FBI agents before a Long Island concert on April 26; he posted bail and performed with the group that evening. Desperate for a new product from the band, on April 28, the group's British distributor EMI released "Then I Kissed Her" as a single without their approval. On April 29, Taylor announced in Disc & Music Echo, "All the 12 songs for the new Beach Boys album are completed and [...] there are plans to release the album on a rush-schedule any moment." That same day, a Taylor-penned press release, published in Record Mirror and NME, revealed that "Heroes and Villains" was delayed due to "technical difficulties" and that the lead single would be "Vegetables" backed with "Wonderful". A session scheduled for May 1 was cancelled.

From May 2 to 20, Wilson's bandmates embarked on another European concert tour. Williams reported in the May issue of Crawdaddy! that the next Beach Boys LP would include "Heroes and Villains" ("weighing in at over four minutes"), "The Elements" ("a composition in four movements"), "The Child Is the Father of the Man" [sic], "and something about going in the yard to eat worms." He wrote, "Lyrics are mostly by Van Dyke Parks, and it is possible that the LP will be finished one of these days. Smile." On May 6, a week after stating that Smile was to be released "any moment", Taylor announced in Disc & Music Echo that the album had been "scrapped" by Wilson; however, it is likely that the report was spurious and that Wilson was unaware of Taylor's proclamation.

On May 14, the bandmates held a press conference at the Amsterdam Hilton with the Dutch music press. Hitweek later reported that communication breakdowns had led them to believe Smile was slated for release by mid-May. Wilson cancelled a May 15 session for "Love to Say Dada", again due to "bad vibes". The final session for the track, and possibly the Smile album, was held on May 18, with a follow-up session scheduled for May 19 subsequently cancelled. From June 3 to 7, the band resumed sessions at professional studios before retreating to the home studio. In a June issue of Hit Parader, Dennis reported that the group had been recording Smile, by then "50% done".

== Smiley Smile, abandonment, and Wilson's decline ==
The gap between conception and realization was too great, and nothing satisfied Brian by the time he'd worked it out and gotten it on tape. And eventually the moment passed [...] like many other fine artists before him, Brian was unable to realize his original concept of Smile when he wanted to, and after a while he no longer wanted to. He no longer had the same vision.

— Paul Williams, writing in the September/October 1967 issue of Crawdaddy!

Wilson later reflected that he had run out of ideas "in a conventional sense" and felt "about ready to die" during this period. He explained, "Time can be spent in the studio to the point where you get so next to it, you don't know where you are with it, you decide to just chuck it for a while." Declaring most Smile recordings abandoned to his bandmates, he later acknowledged that withholding "Surf's Up" "nearly broke up" the band. Between June and July, the Beach Boys embarked on a new album project at Wilson's makeshift home studio, repurposing simplified versions of selected Smile tracks.

Smiley Smile is sometimes considered the fulfillment of Wilson's "humor" concept album. This belief was shared by Anderle, who surmised, "I think that what Brian tried to do with Smiley Smile is he tried to salvage as much of Smile as he could and at the same time immediately go into his humor album." Stylistically akin to Beach Boys' Party!, Carl compared the result to "a bunt instead of a grand slam". The album incorporated four modules from Smile sessions, two each from "Heroes and Villains" and "Vegetables". The cover art adapted Holmes' smile shop illustration, now depicted within an overgrown jungle. Parks was not involved with this project, and despite later reports that the band had considered Smile "too weird", there was no attempt to make the content on Smiley Smile appear less bizarre for their established fanbase. (Note: Heiser suggests that Wilson had likely relied on humorous moods as a strategy to alleviate concerns among both fans and the band about deviating from their sound.)

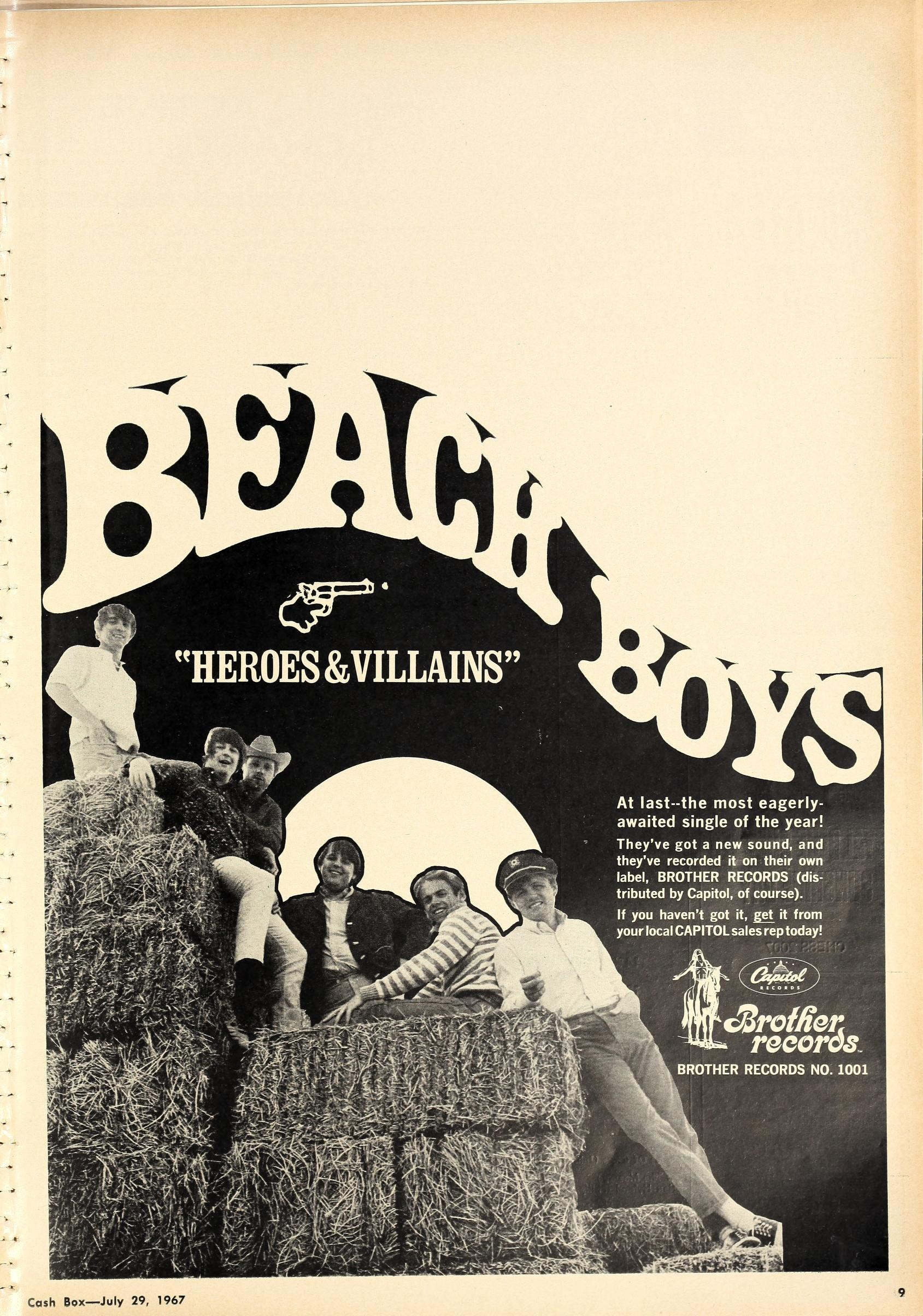
Advertisement for "Heroes and Villains" in Cashbox magazine (July 1967)

During 1967, Wilson's public image had declined into that of an "eccentric" figure amid the release of numerous revolutionary rock albums targeting an increasingly anxious and maturing youth market. It is sometimes suggested that he abandoned Smile because of the widespread recognition afforded to the Beatles' Sgt. Pepper's Lonely Hearts Club Band (released in the U.S. on June 2). Biographer David Leaf contends that while the Beatles' album may have been a contributing factor, it was unlikely the sole reason, as Wilson proceeded to release "Heroes and Villains" weeks later; Williams reported that Wilson had significantly reconfigured the song after hearing the Beatles' LP, and Jardine later suggested that Wilson had restrained himself with the final edit, resulting in "a pale facsimile" of his original vision.

On July 18, Capitol announced a settlement with the band alongside Wilson's launch of Brother Records, whose product was to be distributed by Capitol. Days later, Engemann circulated a July 25 memo describing Smiley Smile as a stopgap for Smile and outlining discussions with Wilson about a pared-down 10-track Smile album excluding "Heroes and Villains" and "Vegetables". The proposal never materialized; instead, the band toured Hawaii in August with plans to release a live album titled Lei'd in Hawaii. On September 18, Smiley Smile—the first Beach Boys album crediting production to the group itself—was released to tepid critical and commercial reception.

After leaving the project in early 1967, Parks joined a creative circle within Warner Bros. that included producer Lenny Waronker. (Note: Parks commented, "[Waronker] invited me over to Warners, not for who I was but for what I'd learned from Brian Wilson. [...] I'd learned a lot from Brian—among other things, a balance between rationality and instinct and play.) Later that year, the company released Parks' debut album Song Cycle, whose legacy was effectively eclipsed by comparisons to Smile. (Note: Randy Newman biographer Kevin Courrier wrote that the "failed aspiration of Smile served as a guiding spirit" for Song Cycle and Newman's 1968 debut album, both produced by Parks and Waronker. Author Richard Henderson, in his book covering Song Cycle, traced the album's use of novel timbres created through "laminates of different instruments playing unison lines" to Wilson's influence.) Despite poor sales, Parks remained at Warner as an arranger, and the professional and business trajectories of Wilson, Parks, Waronker, and Warner Bros. remained closely intertwined in subsequent years. In late 1967, Wilson and Parks wrote "Sunflower Maiden", a song earmarked for Hutton's new group Redwood (later Three Dog Night), though it remains lost.

Wilson gradually withdrew from production and songwriting responsibilities, turning to excessive consumption of food, alcohol, and drugs. Reflecting in 2004, he stated that revisiting the Smile music later evoked "the bad feelings of the drugs" associated with its creation. (Note: Tom Nolan, having asked Jules Siegel circa 1969 why Wilson had been unable and willing to complete the album, later quoted Siegel's response, "I think he was afraid that if he put it out, somebody would kill him." Johnston attributed Wilson's post-Smile decline to multiple factors: the commercial disappointment of Pet Sounds in the U.S., his fraught relationship with his father, substance abuse, and the psychological toll of expectation. Love accused "Anderle and the other hipsters" of complicity in Wilson's psychological decline, arguing that, in their public statements, they ignored their role in enabling his instability by providing him with drugs and convincing him "that the Messiah was coming".) In the decades after its shelving, he associated the project with personal failure and trauma. He dismissed the recordings as "contrived with no soul", "corny drug influenced music", and inferior imitations of Phil Spector's work. When questioned about Smile, he typically refused to engage or abruptly exited conversations, a reluctance that persisted until the early 2000s.

For so long, this project brought me nothing but humiliation. It was the first question people always asked—"How come Smile never came out?"

— Van Dyke Parks, 2004

Parks, in a 1998 interview, minimized his connection to Smile, calling it "just a few months of work I did as a contract employee many years ago", and stating that it held greater significance for fans than himself. According to Carlin, Parks grew frustrated that his career remained overshadowed by an unfinished 1967 project, and that later Beach Boys albums did not honor his contributions on songs, including "Wind Chimes" and "Wonderful", with an official co-writing credit. (Note: Carlin suggested Parks harbored conflicted feelings: guilt over abandoning Wilson during the project's collapse, coupled with resentment toward Wilson's subsequent withdrawal from music. When interviewing Parks, Parks' stance was undercut by his wife's observation that he kept framed Smile artwork in his workspace.)

== Further recording and abandoned Warner Bros. release ==
Material from Smile continued to appear sporadically on subsequent Beach Boys releases, often as filler tracks to compensate for Wilson's reduced creative output. The first examples emerged on the two albums following Smiley Smile: "Mama Says" from Wild Honey (1967) derived from a segment of "Vega-Tables", while "Little Bird" from Friends (1968) incorporated the refrain of "Child Is Father of the Man". Neither "Mama Says" nor "Little Bird" were from the original Smile recording sessions; both tracks were newly recorded for their respective albums.

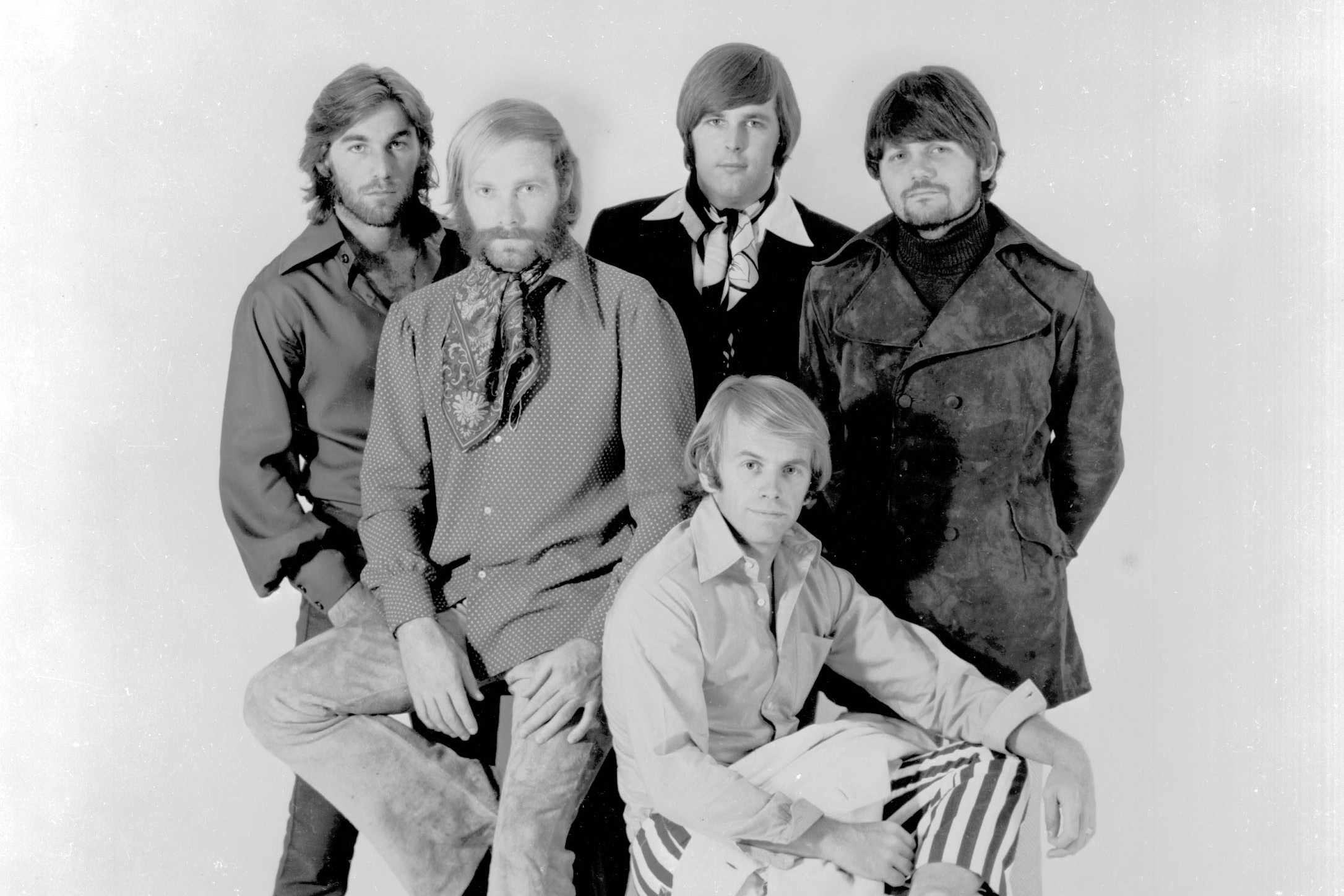
Against Brian's wishes, his bandmates (pictured) finished "Our Prayer" and "Cabinessence" in late 1968.

The Beach Boys' 1969 album 20/20 included reworked Smile tracks: "Cabin Essence" (retitled "Cabinessence") and "Prayer" (retitled "Our Prayer"), both featuring vocals newly recorded by Carl, Dennis, and Bruce Johnston in November 1968. "Workshop" was incorporated into the album's version of "Do It Again". Carlin states that Brian opposed the inclusion of "Our Prayer" and "Cabinessence" and declined to participate in their overdub sessions.

Following 20/20, the group signed with Reprise Records, a subsidiary of Warner, through a deal brokered by Parks, then a Warner multimedia executive. Their contract included a $50,000 advance contingent on delivering a completed Smile album by 1973, a stipulation made without Brian's consultation. The band's 1970 Reprise debut Sunflower featured "Cool, Cool Water", a track derived from "Love to Say Dada" and included at Waronker's insistence.

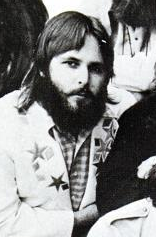
Carl Wilson (pictured) initiated Smile tape preservation efforts with band engineer Stephen Desper in the early 1970s

For their second Reprise album, initially titled Landlocked, the group included "Surf's Up" with Wilson's approval. Between mid-June and early July 1971, Carl and band manager Jack Rieley retrieved Smile multi-tracks from the Capitol archives to locate and reconstruct the song's masters, with Brian joining them on at least two occasions. Recording sessions at Brian's home studio followed, during which he initially declined involvement but later contributed to the "Child Is Father of the Man" coda. The album was retitled Surf's Up and released in August 1971.

At a February 28, 1972, London press conference, Carl announced plans to release Smile, stating he had worked on the album in June 1971 and that safety copies of its tapes had been created. He asserted the tapes were fully assembled with new vocal overdubs added where necessary. A Melody Maker article listed tracks proposed for Carl's Smile iteration, several grouped under the "Heroes and Villains" subtitle: "Child Is Father of the Man" "Surf's Up", "Sunshine", [sic] "Cabinessence" (incorporating "Iron Horse" [sic]), "Mrs. O'Leary's Cow", "I Love to Say Dada" (incorporating "Cool, Cool Water"), and original versions of "Vega-Tables", "Wind Chimes", and "Wonderful". These announcements may have aimed to mislead Reprise into extending the deadline for the band's next album.

Asked about Smile at a later date, Carl responded: "We've all had intentions of finishing the album, but something persists that keeps that from happening, and I don't know what that is." In April 1973, Beach Boys assistant manager Steve Love sent a memo warning the group that Warner Bros. would deduct $50,000 from their next advance if Smile was not delivered by May 1 per their contract. The deadline passed without submission, resulting in the withheld payment (equivalent to $363,000 in 2025). Later that year, Brian told Melody Maker there was insufficient material to compile Smile and that it would remain unreleased. Around this time, he and his group American Spring added new vocals and instrumentation to a remix of Dean Torrence's 1967 version of "Vegetables", credited to "Laughing Gravy" on Jan and Dean's compilation Gotta Take That One Last Ride. Three years later, Wilson stated that he felt an obligation to release Smile, estimating it might emerge "probably in a couple years". By 1980, he stated an intent to complete Smile in three movements, according to Gaines.

== Bootlegs, official releases, and fan efforts ==
=== Earliest bootlegs, personalized mixes, and fan network ===
Most original Smile recordings remained exclusive to bootlegs until 2011. These unofficial releases typically featured hypothetical versions of the album, with compilers providing liner notes that rationalized their track sequencing, and relying on the list of song titles printed on the unused 1966 album sleeves as a key reference point. Bootlegs circulating as Smile emerged in the late 1970s, combining tracks from Smiley Smile, 20/20, and Surf's Up. Compilers relied solely on the jacket's song titles, often unaware most released tracks had originated after the 1966 sessions.

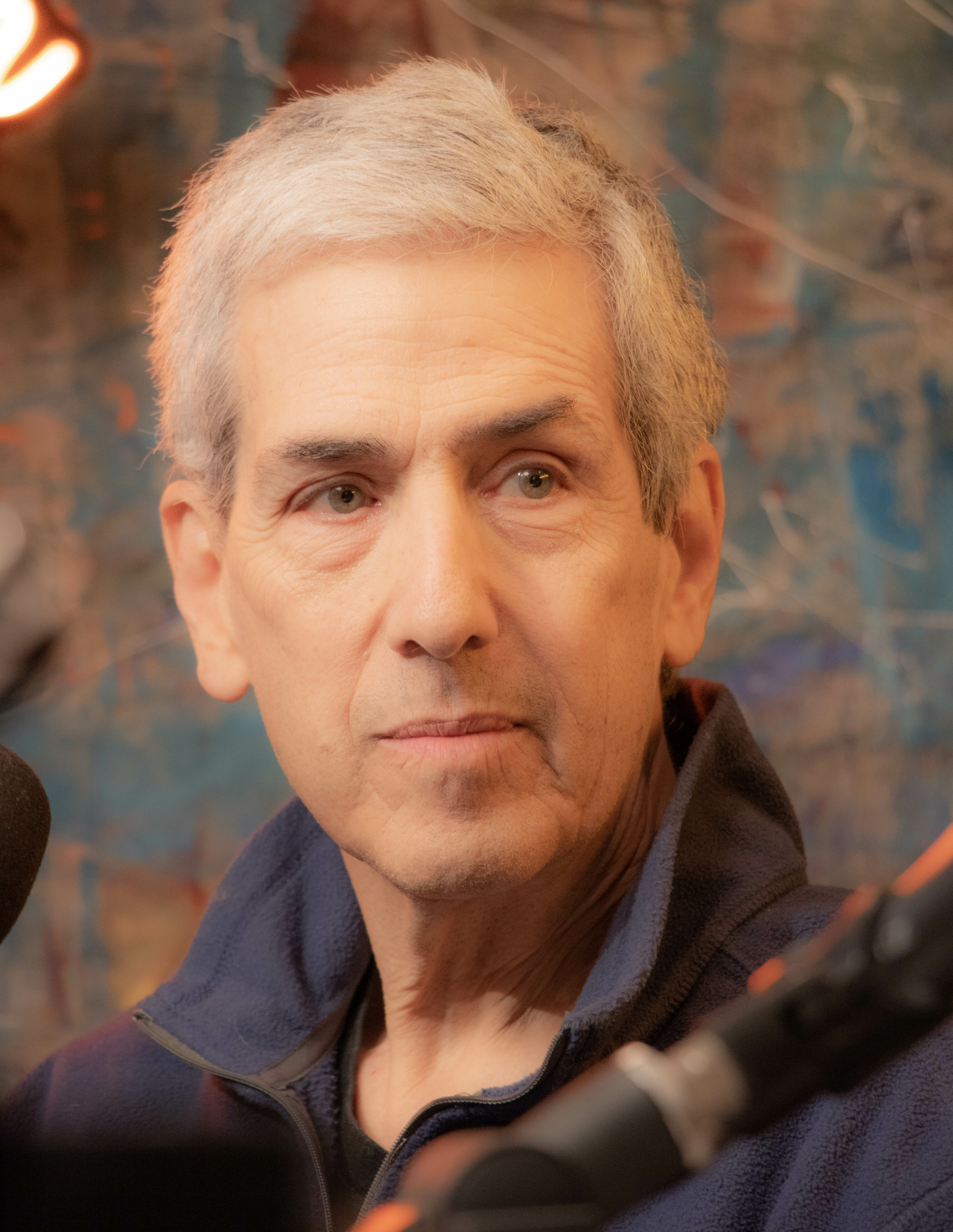
Biographer David Leaf (pictured in 2022) traveled to California in the 1970s with the goal of helping Wilson complete Smile.

During the 1970s and early 1980s, Beach Boys fan groups were organized by at least a dozen individuals, including David Leaf, Don Cunningham, Marty Tabor, and Domenic Priore. (Note: Other notable fans were Alice Lillie, Paula Perrin, Peter Reum, and Mike Grant.) These groups primarily communicated through newsletters that shared information and connected enthusiasts compiling details about the band's music. Membership growth was partly spurred by an advertisement for the official fan club, Beach Boys Freaks United, featured on the back cover of their 1976 album 15 Big Ones. Priore later described the club's newsletter as minimal but noted its "Trading Post" section served as a vital pre-Internet networking tool. (Note: Surveys in Tabor's late-1970s Friends of the Beach Boys showed strong reader interest in the band's psychedelic era and the release of Smile alongside other rare tracks.)

There's been too much press on it. It's like talking about bringing out the '67 Rolls Royce and they finally show it in [modern day]. You go, "Oh, no."

— Bruce Johnston arguing against a full Smile release in 1981

In Leaf's 1978 biography of the band, he proposed releasing Smile through a series of records titled The Smile Sessions, akin to Elvis Presley's The Sun Sessions (1976). Johnston criticized the proposed Smile Sessions release as commercially unviable, stating it would only satisfy listeners with a niche interest akin to "Zubin Mehta analyzing a young composer's work." (Note: In a 1978 interview, Johnston discussed manager James William Guercio's decision to open the band's' 1979 album L.A. (Light Album) with "Rock Plymouth Rock/Roll" [sic] while expressing his own desire to compile Smile material with Brian's involvement. Johnston said: "I wanted to make up a collage [of the Smile recordings], but I want Brian to be the one to put the collage together. I can tell he still feels funny about that stuff. You know, there's a lot of Smile stuff intact [...]". By 1981, Johnston revealed intentions to release a six-minute Smile compilation without Wilson's knowledge.)

=== First public availability, further release rumors, and arrests ===
Scholar Andrew Flory writes the origins of genuine Smile material reaching bootleggers remain unclear, though unverified claims suggest Dennis copied tapes for friends that were later recopied. Despite contemporaneous rumors of leaked tapes and acetates, only limited authentic material circulated before the early 1980s. (Note: While writing his 1978 authorized band biography, Byron Preiss had received a tape of Smile recordings that was later shared with a limited audience in subsequent years.) In 1983, a 48-minute cassette tape circulated among fans and was later pressed as an unauthorized LP known as the "Brother Records" Smile. The compilation featured Smile-related tracks and outtakes, including the misattributed 1959 Miles Davis recording "Here Come de Honey Man" (erroneously titled "Holidays"). (Note: Other contents included "Wonderful" and "Wind Chimes" from Smiley Smile, the "Water Chant" segment of "Cool, Cool Water" from Sunflower (incorrectly titled "I Love to Say Da Da"), various versions of "Can't Wait Too Long", an alternate mix of "Good Vibrations", "George Fell into His French Horn", "Mrs. O'Leary's Cow", and the Laughing Gravy rendition of "Vega-Tables".) The LP sleeve lacked authorship credits but listed addresses for Cunningham's Add Some Music, Tabor's Celebrate, Beach Boys Freaks United, and the Australian fan publication California Music.

In April 1985, the documentary The Beach Boys: An American Band premiered with previously unreleased material, including an excerpt of "Fire." That year, a "Second Edition" of the Brother Records LP surfaced, omitting the original addresses and rearranging the track order. It featured alternate mixes, implying newly accessed Smile recordings. The enhanced audio quality further suggested that cassette copies had been made from the band's master tapes by an insider. In 1987, Waronker encouraged Wilson to write a Smile-style song for his solo debut album, leading to the "Rio Grande" suite co-composed with multi-instrumentalist Andy Paley.

During the production of Wilson's solo album, his engineer Mark Linett had mixed Smile tracks for a planned release. By 1988, Wilson confirmed Smile was being prepared for release but cited business-related delays. He expressed concerns about its commercial appeal, given it consisted mostly of instrumental tracks, and proposed having bandmates record overdubbed vocals. Wilson abandoned these plans after a cassette compiled for Capitol executives leaked to the public. A collaborator on Wilson's solo album had obtained first-generation copies of Smile recordings, which were shared with a DJ and subsequently circulated widely, leading to a proliferation of Smile bootleg albums. By the mid-1980s, CDs had become the primary bootleg format, and after the Linett tape leak, dozens of distinct Smile CD releases were distributed via mail order, independent stores, and head shops. Many purchasers transitioned from Beatles bootleg markets. Among the most prominent releases was a November 1989 Japanese CD that opened with a 15-minute version of "Good Vibrations".

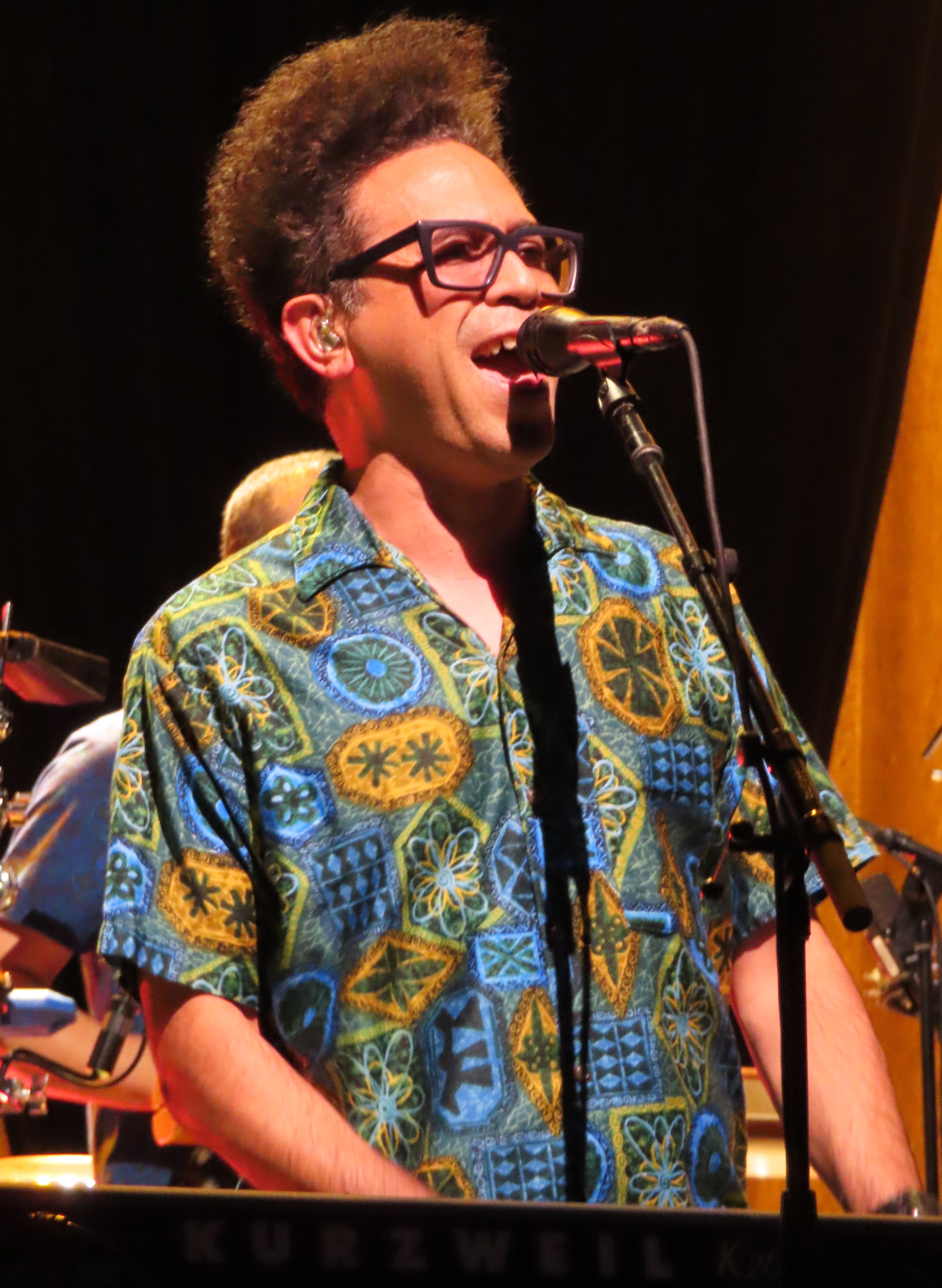
Musician Darian Sahanaja, who collaborated on the first book about Smile, later joined Wilson's live band in 1999.

The wider circulation of Smile bootlegs demonstrated the album's near-complete state, contradicting Wilson's public statements. In the late 1980s, Domenic Priore collaborated with musicians Darian Sahanaja and Nick Walusko on The Dumb Angel Gazette, a punk-style fanzine and the most comprehensive attempt at documenting the album. The second issue, Look! Listen! Vibrate! Smile!, presented a 300-page history of the album through press clippings, reprinted articles, primary sources, and original analysis, selling about 40,000 copies. Contributors included Leaf, Paley, journalist Greg Shaw, and musician Probyn Gregory.

I seriously doubt that any of you reading this don't have a homemade cassette recorder. If you do, then try this suggestion on a blank homemade cassette: COMPILE A SMILE ALBUM BY YOURSELF AT HOME!!!

— Music historian Domenic Priore writing in his book Look! Listen! Vibrate! Smile!

In the 1990s, two types of Smile bootlegs emerged: compilations attempting to reconstruct the album in a finished form and collections of session recordings. Among the best-known releases were those by underground labels Vigotone and Sea of Tunes, which issued Smile sets combining elements of both formats, generating broader interest in the recordings beyond the Beach Boys' fanbase. Vigotone's 1993 version was the most widely circulated Smile bootleg during the decade.

Capitol included alternate versions of "Good Vibrations" and "Heroes and Villains" as bonus tracks on the 1990 CD reissue of Smiley Smile and Wild Honey and, responding to the 1992 emergence of a three-disc vinyl bootleg that included some previously uncirculated tracks, released over 40 minutes of original Smile recordings on the 1993 box set Good Vibrations. (Note: The Good Vibrations box set included the official debut of "Do You Like Worms?", "I Love to Say Da Da", Smile versions of "Wonderful", "Wind Chimes" and "Vegetables", session excerpts of "Surf's Up" and "Cabinessence", and mislabeled "Heroes and Villains" outtakes.) This compilation marked the first official release of a compiled Smile album, sequenced by Leaf, Paley, and Linett. However, the tracks were presented largely in raw form and without approximating the intended final product. Leaf's liner notes encouraged listeners to assemble their own versions using the included materials, prompting many fans to do so.

In 1995, Wilson reunited with Parks for the collaborative album Orange Crate Art, which provoked speculation of a potential Smile release. That year, Wilson performed "Wonderful" in its original Smile arrangement for the Don Was-directed documentary I Just Wasn't Made for These Times, with the rendition included on the accompanying soundtrack album. Capitol also announced a three-CD box set titled The Smile Era, scheduled for release in late 1995. It failed to materialize, partly due to the complexity involved with compiling and sequencing the material. Was had proposed releasing Smile as an interactive CD-ROM, akin to Todd Rundgren's No World Order (1993), that would have contained session content for listeners to assemble themselves, an idea Wilson reportedly supported. According to Mike Love, after finishing the Beach Boys' 1996 album Stars and Stripes Vol. 1, discussions to complete Smile were vetoed by Carl over concerns it might jeopardize Brian's mental health. Capitol's hesitation was further influenced by the 18-month delay experienced during the release of The Pet Sounds Sessions (1997), discouraging similar efforts for Smile. During promotion for his 1998 album Imagination, Wilson dismissed Smile, saying, "I thought too much. Smile was just a bunch of weird stuff that didn't even amount to anything."

In the late 1990s, Sea of Tunes issued eight CDs containing seven hours of Smile recordings as part of their "Unsurpassed Masters" series. By the end of the decade, Smile had become one of the most well-documented projects among bootleggers. Authorities later arrested individuals involved with Sea of Tunes, seizing nearly 10,000 discs. Vigotone, following their 1998 bootleg Heroes and Vibrations, planned a multi-disc Smile set but ceased operations after a 2001 law enforcement raid.

=== 2004 rerecording, The Smile Sessions, and deepfake mixes ===
Wilson completed a reimagined version of Smile in 2004 with support from the longstanding fan network that had developed since the 1970s. In 1999, Sahanaja, Walusko, and Gregory—who had together formed the pop group Wondermints—were recruited into Wilson's supporting band. In 2001, he performed "Heroes and Villains" publicly for the first time in decades. Following this performance, Sahanaja proposed incorporating Smile material into rehearsals, leading to plans for dedicated concerts. Sahanaja assumed the role of "musical secretary", while Parks contributed new lyrics. Together with Wilson, they structured the work into three movements. Sahanaja recalled that Wilson and Parks approached the project as if "finishing" Smile.

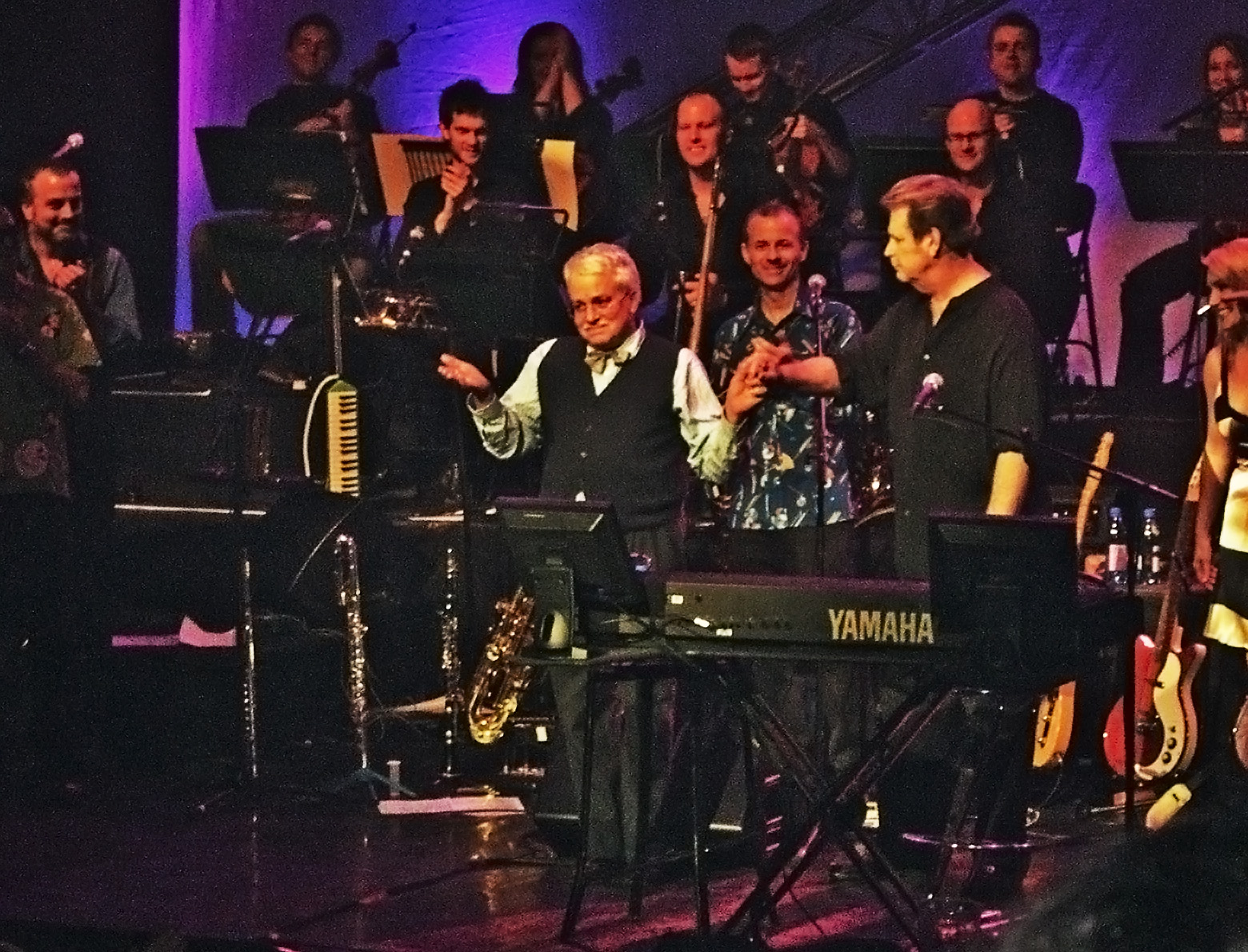
Parks joining Wilson onstage after a performance of Brian Wilson Presents Smile at the Royal Festival Hall, February 2004.

Brian Wilson Presents Smile (BWPS) premiered in February 2004 at the Royal Festival Hall in London, followed by a studio album version recorded six weeks later and released in September. Leaf's accompanying documentary, Beautiful Dreamer: Brian Wilson and the Story of Smile, premiered on Showtime in October. The project was realized without participation from Wilson's former Beach Boys bandmates or original recordings. The album peaked at number 13 on the Billboard 200, the highest chart position of any album by the Beach Boys or Wilson since 1976. He subsequently embarked on a global tour spanning the U.S., Europe, and Japan.

The Smile Sessions, following in October 2011, marked the first official release dedicated to the Beach Boys' Smile. It compiled session highlights, outtakes, and a reconstructed version of the album modeled after Wilson's 2004 version. Contributors included longtime Beach Boys fan community members such as Priore and Reum, who provided essays and consultation. The set received widespread critical acclaim, earned a ranking on Rolling Stone's 2012 "500 Greatest Albums of All Time" list, and won Best Historical Album at the 55th Grammy Awards.

In 2011, Smile topped Uncut's list of the greatest bootleg recordings of all time. By 2023, fanmade Smile assemblies had incorporated the use of audio deepfake techniques to present a completed album.

== Musical impact and influence ==
Following its shelving, Smile gradually attained a cult following within the American underground music scene despite its incomplete state. In Courrier's words, the project "became oddly influential. While functioning mostly as a rumor, when some bootlegged tracks confirmed its existence, Smile became a catalyst for records that followed in its wake." (Note: In his belief, the work transformed into a benchmark for subsequent albums, including the Beatles' Sgt. Pepper, Love's Forever Changes (1967), the Byrds' The Notorious Byrd Brothers (1968), Hendrix's Electric Ladyland (1968), Al Kooper's You Never Know Who Your Friends Are (1968), Spirit's Twelve Dreams of Dr. Sardonicus (1970), Shuggie Otis' Inspiration Information (1974), and Fleetwood Mac's Tusk (1979). Lindsey Buckingham, during the making of Tusk, had access to unreleased Smile recordings, which he employed as a reference for songs such as "That's All for Everyone".) It served as a foundational influence on indie rock, art-driven post-punk, acts such as Pere Ubu, XTC, R.E.M., and the Pixies, and bands tagged as "chamber pop". (Note: The iTunes release of BWPS was designated "indie rock".) In Priore's estimation, the "alternate-rock" generation began embracing Smile after the early 1990s, adding that his book about the album had elicited interest from musicians including XTC, Apples in Stereo, and George Harrison. In Scotland, musicians including David Scott of the Pearlfishers and Duglas T. Stewart of BMX Bandits organized a Smile-themed concert before assembling the 2000 tribute album Caroline Now!, both with Wilson's endorsement. Journalist Rob Chapman wrote in 2002 that he had "yet to meet an ambient or electronica artist who doesn't have a soundfile full of Smile bytes".

The potential of what Smile would have been was the primary thing that inspired us. When we started hearing Smile bootlegs, it was mind-blowing. It was what we had hoped it would be, but a lot of those songs weren't finished, so there was still this mystery of not hearing the melodies and lyrics. We wondered, "What are these songs and how do they fit together? Is this a verse?"

— Elephant 6 and Apples in Stereo co-founder Robert Schneider

The Elephant 6 Recording Company, a collective of bands that includes Apples in Stereo, the Olivia Tremor Control, Neutral Milk Hotel, Beulah, Elf Power, and of Montreal, was founded through a mutual admiration of 1960s pop music, especially Smile, which they regarded as the epoch's "Holy Grail". Will Cullen Hart appreciated "the idea of the sections, each of them being a colorful world within itself. [Wilson's] stuff could be so cinematic and then he could just drop down to a toy piano going plink, plink, plink and then, when you least expect it, it can fly back into a million gorgeous voices." According to Kevin Barnes, of Montreal's album Coquelicot Asleep in the Poppies: A Variety of Whimsical Verse (2001) was inspired in part by the "screwball" quality of Smile.

Released exclusively in Japan, the 1998 tribute album Smiling Pets featured cover versions of Pet Sounds and Smile tracks by artists such as the Olivia Tremor Control, Jim O'Rourke, and Sonic Youth's Thurston Moore. Trey Spruance, who had contributed a rendition of "Good Vibrations", said that Smile "definitely" influenced the Mr. Bungle album California (1999), "especially when it comes to the Faustian scale of it." The cover artwork for Velvet Crush's Teenage Symphonies to God (1994) was based on the Smile cover. Weird Al Yankovic created a parody song, "Pancreas", for his 2006 album Straight Outta Lynwood.

Kevin Shields of My Bloody Valentine said that his band's 2013 album MBV was inspired by the modular approach of Smile. Priore believed that Smile influence was apparent on albums such as XTC's Oranges & Lemons (1989), the High Llamas' Gideon Gaye (1994) and Hawaii (1996), the Flaming Lips' The Soft Bulletin (1999), Mercury Rev's All Is Dream (2001), the Apples in Stereo's Her Wallpaper Reverie (1999), Heavy Blinkers' 2000 eponymous LP, and the Thrills' So Much for the City (2003).

== Critical perspectives and legacy ==
=== Innovations and retrospective appraisals ===
Wilson applied editing techniques on Smile that were not standard practice until the advent of digital audio workstations. (Note: Linett said that Wilson had effectively "invented the method of modular recording that we take for granted today.") Similar structural ambitions would later emerge in extended rock suites like Queen's "Bohemian Rhapsody" (1975) and 10cc's "Une nuit a Paris" (1975). Prior to late-1960s works reflecting LSD's destabilizing effects in rock music, artists had largely avoided addressing the darker aspects of psychedelia; music critic Alexis Petridis cited Smile as an early exploration of these themes through tracks such as "Fire". Carter identifies the album's formal complexity, varied instrumentation, and lyrical themes as anticipating progressive rock developments of the late 1960s and early 1970s; thematically, its shift from urban materialism toward natural imagery prefigured the Americana genre later exemplified by the Band's Music from Big Pink (1968). Williams characterized Wilson as one of the earliest pioneers of sampling, while Priore likened his manipulation of sound effects to techniques later employed by Pink Floyd on The Dark Side of the Moon (1973). The album cover—considered to be among the most "legendary" in rock music, according to Priore—would have been one of the earliest instances of a popular music group featuring original commissioned artwork.

If music students in a hundred years' time want a master class in the development of compositional technique in twentieth century popular music then they should listen to the Smile tapes. [...] [they stand] totally apart from what anybody else was producing during the mid-'60s.

— Mojo journalist Rob Chapman, 2002

In his 2014-published 33⅓ book about the album, Luis Sanchez regarded Smile as a "radical" extension of Pet Sounds' "glow and sui generis vision", marked by "a kind of directness that is unlike anything else in popular music". Ed Masley of AZ Central believed that while the album diverged sonically from contemporaneous psychedelic works, it "clearly" reflected an adventurous ethos "that would have been unthinkable just two years earlier." Stylus magazine contributor Ed Howard suggested that its "arty experimentation", "exotic, often surprising arrangements", and "twisting wordplay" had "arguably" exceeded the innovative scope of the Beatles' concurrent output. A contributor for Freaky Trigger, in 1999, characterized Smile as "astoundingly original" and a reflection of an unrealized trajectory in rock history, though not "the best album ever."

Philip Lambert, who authored book-length analyses on the music of Wilson and Charles Ives, described Smile as "a landmark artwork that could have captured the spirit of a generation"; had Wilson realized his ambitions, he would have effectively created "a whole new genre of popular music". NewMusicBox, while dedicated to contemporary non-commercial music, covered Smile in 2011 despite its standing as "an album recorded more than 45 years ago by one of the biggest (and most financially lucrative) musical acts of all time". Reviewer Frank Oteri wrote that Wilson's mid-1960s experimentation was consonant with broader genre-blurring trends, but less radical than contemporaneous efforts. He concluded that the album's legacy remained overshadowed by the Beach Boys' enduring image as a "light-hearted party band" associated with earlier hits, limiting its recognition alongside innovators like Ives or John Coltrane, though it "would have, could have, and should have" surpassed the Beatles' Sgt. Pepper as the era's defining artistic breakthrough.

=== Mythology and speculation ===
Following its non-release, Smile became the subject of widespread speculation and gained status as the most "legendary" unreleased album in popular music. Numerous journalists and associates present at the sessions contributed chiefly to this stature, especially Siegel, whose October 1967 memoir "Goodbye Surfing, Hello God!", published in Cheetah, initiated the mythos surrounding the album Originally commissioned by The Saturday Evening Post at Siegel's persistence, the magazine had rejected the article due to his enthusiastic praise of Wilson's work at a time when rock music was rarely granted serious evaluation. Siegel remembered, "They didn't really want it and when they got it they couldn't believe that I took Brian so seriously." (Note: Siegel's article originated numerous popular anecdotes, including Wilson's Seconds incident, his cancelling of a $3,000 recording session due to "bad vibrations", and his suspicions that an associate was practicing witchcraft, which Siegel later revealed had been his girlfriend. Siegel, recalling parallels he had felt between Wilson and Bach, later stated that he was encouraged by Oppenheim to incorporate such a comparison into the article: "He said, 'Write it.' I couldn't do it. I would have been ridiculed if I had written that.") Flory attributed the memoir with providing rock audiences a framework to perceive Wilson as "hip" and venerating Smile as an artifact of that ethos, heightening public interest.

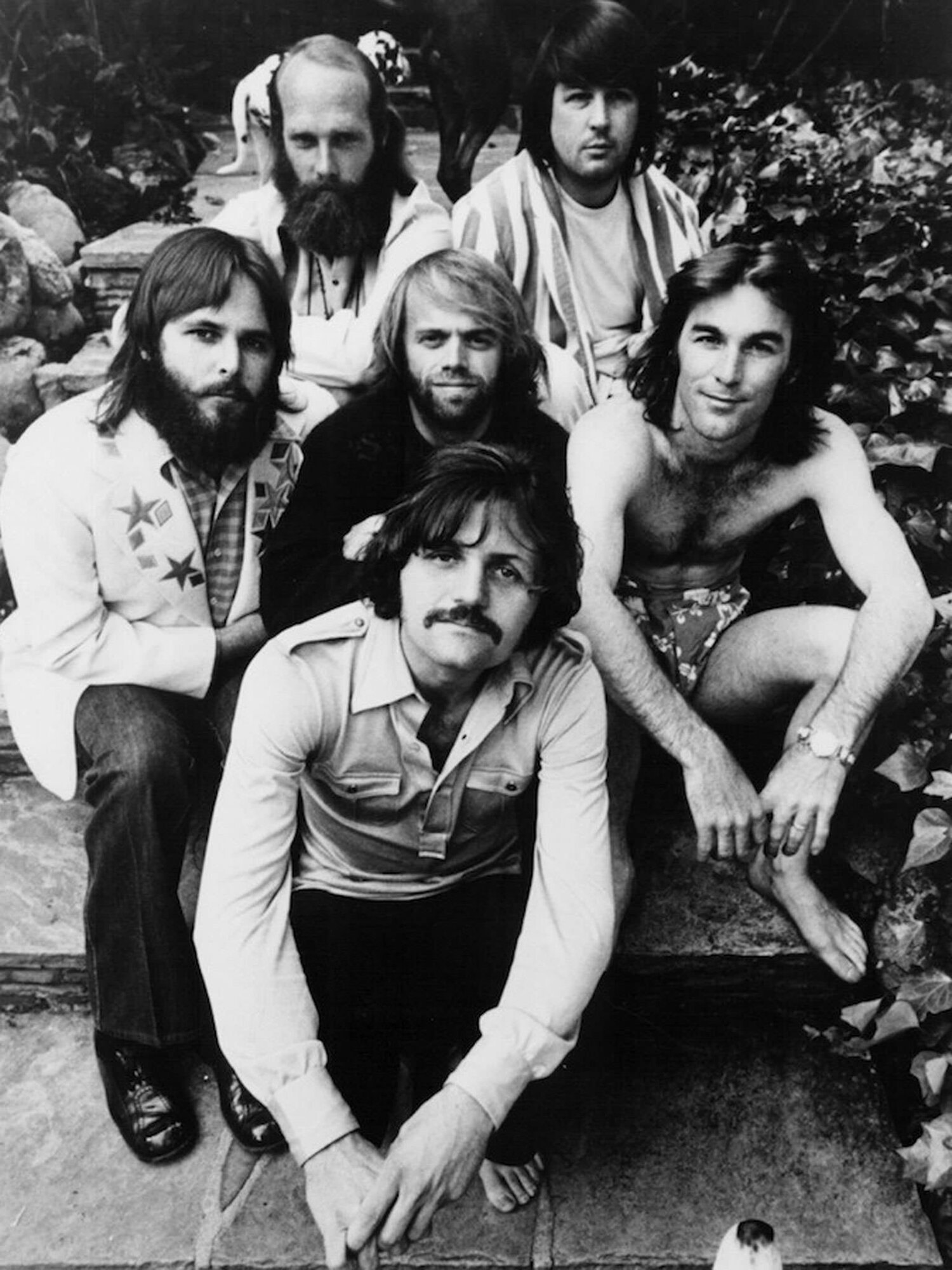
The Beach Boys at a Rolling Stone photoshoot held at Wilson's home, 1971

A published conversation between Anderle and Williams, serialized in Crawdaddy in 1968, served as another early source of information. Accounts from Anderle and others, occasionally anonymous, were further disseminated in a 1971 Rolling Stone feature by Nolan and Leaf's 1978 biography The Beach Boys and the California Myth. Nolan's article reported that Brian was "really turned off" by his surrounding commentary, including the Siegel piece, according to Carl. (Note: Siegel stated that Brian had disliked the coverage dedicated to his erratic behavior.) Music critics had increasingly engaged with its mythology by the 1970s and Smile ultimately became one of the most extensively analyzed and debated unreleased works in music history. Dave Marsh, in 1983, criticized this phenomenon as "an exercise in myth-mongering almost unparalleled in show business", arguing that Wilson's artistic reputation had been inflated through inaccessible work. (Note: Journalist Bill Holdship reported in 1995 that some Los Angeles residents he had encountered were "as obsessed with Smile the same way people are obsessed with the Kennedy assassination." Chapman wrote in 2002 that the album had transformed into "the ultimate metaphor for pop's golden age; that moment when everything seemed possible, when heaven seemed reachable".)

Anderle, in a follow-up dialogue with Williams in 1997, acknowledged his role in shaping the album's legend, stating, "I guess we all do that. We all extend the story, don't we? We all extend the moment. It's satisfying. But what a burden for Brian [...]" He accused Siegel in particular of making himself "feel like he was more important" by calling Wilson a "genius". (Note: Siegel's 1967 coverage had included a tongue-in-cheek reference to Wilson's "genius" branding by considering whether he was "a genius, Genius, or GENIUS".) Countering these statements, Siegel later described Anderle as a "manipulator" projecting his own tendencies, adding, "Brian was a genius and, if anything, I underestimated him. [...] I wasn't aware of him as a myth. I just wrote down what I saw and heard." After revisiting the recordings for the first time in 16 years, Williams reassessed his stance, arguing that separating the album from its "myth", which he and Anderle "certainly helped create", revealed "the work of someone very stoned". (Note: Williams characterized the recordings as containing moments of "great sensitivity and deep feeling", albeit largely "a sort of three-ring circus of flashy musical ideas and avant-garde entertainment" that lacked the sincerity of Pet Sounds.)

By the late 1990s, online fan communities had produced numerous essays analyzing the work, followed by dedicated book-length studies in subsequent years. Its mythos inspired the novels Glimpses (1993) by Lewis Shiner and Summer Fun (2021) by Jeanne Thornton. The 2007 comedy film Walk Hard: The Dewey Cox Story contained a segment inspired by the production of Smile, in which the protagonist is consumed with recording his "masterpiece" (titled "Black Sheep") before suffering a mental breakdown. Parks was commissioned to write the parody song. Sanchez felt the myth, sustained by "writers and cultists [...] rehashing hyperbole and rumor", had since lost its power to "lure and convince", though it overshadowed and "nearly consumed the artist and the music it was about." While acknowledging Wilson's musical achievements, Love wrote in his 2016 memoir, "it speaks to the self-absorption of Brian's hagiographers and sycophants who view Smile only as a musical event. [...] I cannot separate the music from the man, and I cannot separate the man from the physical and emotional turmoil that befell him." (Note: In 1993, he stated he believed Smile "would have been a great record", but in its unfinished state, is "nothing, it's just fragments". According to Heiser, "Love's ongoing hostility towards Van Dyke Parks is clearly evident by the fact he fails to make any reference to him by name in his [liner] notes [for The Smile Sessions]".)

=== Hypothetical release scenario ===
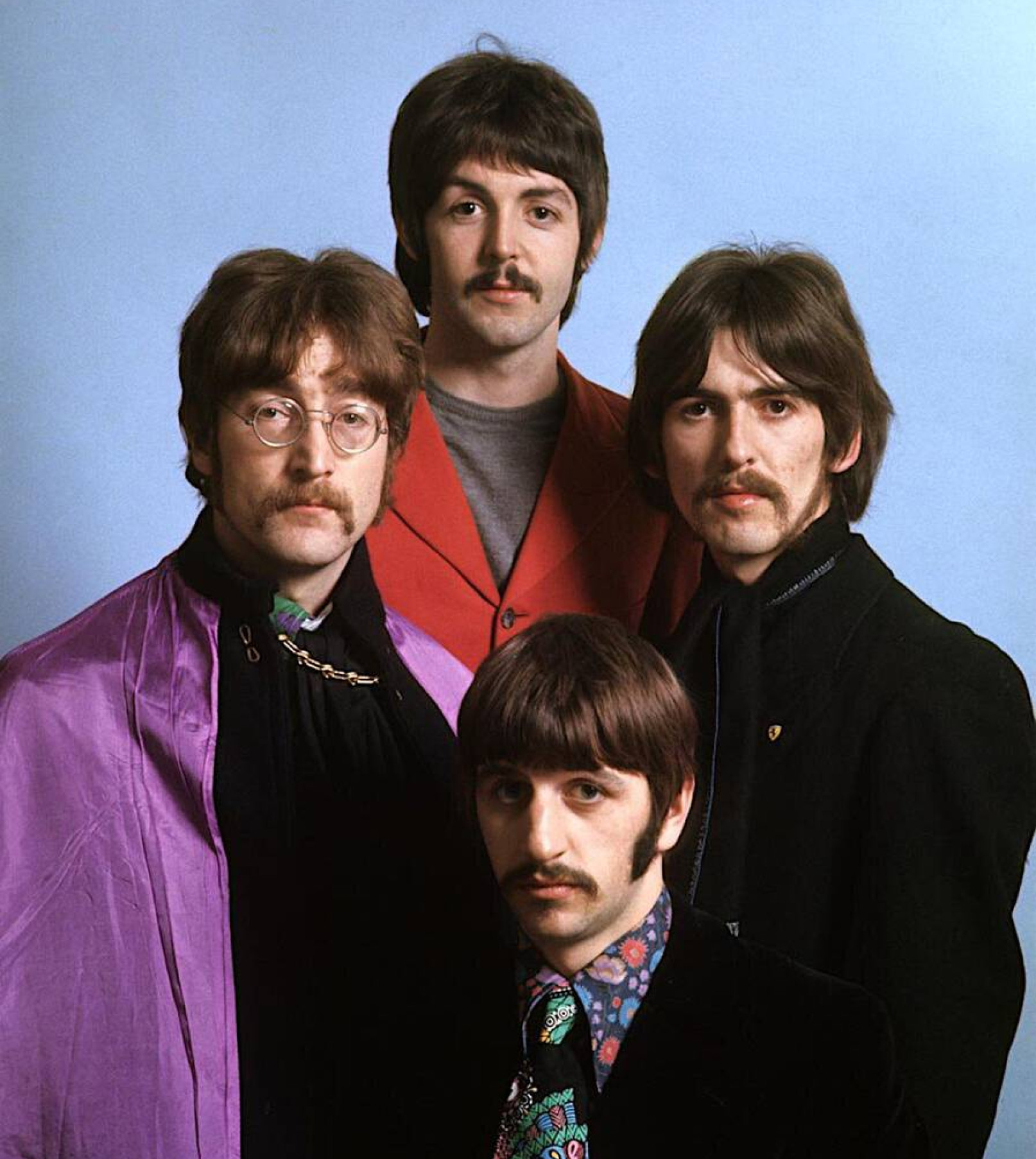
The Beatles in 1967. Part of the speculation surrounding Smile centers on whether the album's reception would have rivaled or surpassed the band's Sgt. Pepper.

Many commentators have suggested that the album's release could have redefined the Beach Boys' artistic trajectory and reinforced their status as rock innovators. (Note: David Howard, in his 2004 book Sonic Alchemy, stated that a completed version would likely be recognized as a landmark pop statement rather than "an infamous, unfortunate footnote." Ed Howard posited in 2003 that the work had potential to expand creative boundaries for the group and popular music, calling its obscurity "the saddest fact in all of music.") Author Allan Moore proposed that the album might have transformed the concept album format through recurring musical motifs, "a form frankly far more sophisticated than any of its contemporaries." Spencer Owen suggested in Pitchfork that Smile might have shifted popular music's historical trajectory and reduced the Beatles' dominant cultural stature. Brian Boyd of The Irish Times rued that while Wilson's rivalry with the Beatles had contributed to the project's collapse, its release might have delayed the Beatles' dissolution due to mutual artistic competition.

Given the runtime constraints of vinyl discs, much of the Smile material would likely have been excluded. According to Mark Linett, while double albums by artists like Frank Zappa and Bob Dylan emerged contemporaneously, no plans existed for a multi-disc Smile release in 1966 or 1967. Mojo's Jim Irvin challenged assumptions of the album's hypothetical perfection, positing it might have been received as an extended, disjointed work akin to a "forty-minute 'Heroes and Villains' with some stuff about vegetables in the middle", potentially facing a reception similar to Parks' Song Cycle.

Asked in a 1987 interview whether Smile would have topped his rivals' subsequent release, Wilson replied: "No. It wouldn't have come close. Sgt. Pepper would have kicked our ass." Later, he claimed that his work would have been "too advanced" for 1967 audiences. Writing in his book about Sgt. Pepper, Clinton Heylin criticized Parks' lyrics as "little more than columns of non sequiturs from a man who once swallowed a thesaurus" and decreed that much of the surviving Smile recordings "confirm that Wilson was nowhere near completing an album to rival Revolver let alone its psychedelic successor." In the opinion of Kicks co-editor Billy Miller, "nobody would have got too jazzed over electricity being invented for the second time" had Smile followed the release of Sgt. Pepper, "And it's a damn shame, too".

Reviewing the available bootlegs and officially released tracks for AllMusic, Richie Unterberger said that "numerous exquisitely beautiful passages, great ensemble singing, and brilliant orchestral pop instrumentation" were in circulation, yet "the fact is that Wilson somehow lacked the discipline needed to combine them into a pop masterpiece that was both brilliant and commercial." Former Record Collector editor Peter Doggett states that Smile would most likely have had the same reception as that afforded Song Cycle – namely, critical acclaim but a commercial disaster. He suggested that while the release "would surely have set the Beatles back for months while they considered a suitable reply", it lacked the mainstream appeal of contemporaneous acts like the Doors, Love, or Jefferson Airplane, potentially leaving Wilson disillusioned and the Beach Boys without unreleased material to bolster later albums.

=== Non-definitive structure and fan interactivity ===
[T]he main reason SMiLE is so unique [is that it was] the first album that forced fans to interact with it directly. We had to make our own edits and running orders on cassettes. They enjoyed debates on how it was supposed to be heard and what tracks were really intended to be included in the mythic "Elements" suite that supposedly would have climaxed the album.

— Mike Segretto, author of 33 1/3 Revolutions Per Minute: A Critical Trip Through the Rock LP Era (2022)

The definitive structure and content of Smile remain unresolved, with debate persisting over its classification as a conventional album. Further complicating efforts to reconstruct a completed album is the permanent loss of many session tapes and trial mixes that would have illuminated Wilson's original creative intent. (Note: While Priore argued that Smile was largely complete by 1967, Ed Howard countered that the album was "nowhere near finished", arguing that any reconstruction would rely on speculation, as Wilson himself lacked a consistent vision for the project. Academic Larry Starr opined that the pursuit of a definitive Smile version decades after Wilson halted the project was "always chemerical".) Anderle felt that the album should be viewed as a creative period, encompassing Pet Sounds and "Good Vibrations", rather than a standalone work. Heiser favored "sonic menagerie", a term coined by Smile Sessions co-producer Dennis Wolfe in the compilation's liner notes. In a 2004 dialogue with Wilson, Parks speculated their work on Smile could have unintentionally pioneered the concept of an interactive album.

Following BWPS, critics widely treated the original project as conclusively finished. Toop characterized attempts to finalize the album as "misguided", describing Smile instead as a "labyrinth" existing within a conceptual "memory house" where Wilson invited collaborators to manifest its components. Freaky Trigger similarly argued that the work lacks a definitive track sequence or completion due to its modular, organic structure, which inherently resists definitive framing. Further to its fragmented legacy and film-like editing process, Toop likened the editorial challenges to unfinished cinematic endeavors by Orson Welles, Erich von Stroheim, and Sergei Eisenstein. (Note: When compiling The Smile Sessions, Alan Boyd made use of film editing software Final Cut Pro.) Howard similarly suggested the material functions most effectively as an archival document of the recording process, akin to a film reel presenting multiple iterations without a singular authoritative version.

== Track table ==
Adapted from The Smile Sessions liner notes and Andrew Doe's Bellagio 10542 online compendium.

Track	Recording span																	
Track	1966											1967					1968	1971
Track	February	March	April	May	June	July	August	September	October	November	December	January	February	March	April	May	1968	1971
‡ "Good Vibrations"																		
‡ "Heroes and Villains"																		
# "Wind Chimes"																		
† "Look (Song for Children)"																		
# "Wonderful"																		
# "He Gives Speeches"																		
† "Holidays"																		
‡ "Our Prayer"																		
‡ "Cabin Essence"																		
# "Child Is Father of the Man"																		
# "I'm in Great Shape"																		
# "Vega-Tables"																		
# "Do You Like Worms?"																		
# "Barnyard"																		
‡ "Surf's Up"																		
# "My Only Sunshine"																		
† "The Elements: Fire"																		
† "I Wanna Be Around"																		
‡ "You're Welcome"																		
# "Love to Say Dada"																		
† "I Don't Know"																		
# "Gee"																		
† "Tones" / "Tune X"																		

Key

	Recording
	Demo or studio experiment
†	Survives only as an instrumental
#	Recorded with vocals
‡	Finished

== Reconstruction track listings ==
All tracks written by Brian Wilson and Van Dyke Parks, except where noted.

1993: Good Vibrations: Thirty Years of the Beach Boys, disc two (relevant Smile portion) – sequenced by Mark Linett, Andy Paley, David Leaf
No.	Title	Length
17.	"Good Vibrations" (Brian Wilson, Mike Love)	3:38
18.	"Our Prayer" (Wilson)	1:07
19.	"Heroes and Villains"	2:56
20.	"Heroes and Villains (Sections)"	6:40
21.	"Wonderful"	2:02
22.	"Cabinessence"	3:33
23.	"Wind Chimes"	2:32
24.	"Heroes and Villains (Intro)"	0:35
25.	"Do You Like Worms"	4:00
26.	"Vegetables"	3:29
27.	"I Love to Say Da Da"	1:34
28.	"Surf's Up"	3:38
Total length:		35:44

2004: Brian Wilson Presents Smile – sequenced by Brian Wilson, Van Dyke Parks, Darian Sahanaja
No.	Title	Length
1.	"Our Prayer" / "Gee" (Wilson, William Davis, Morris Levy)	2:09
2.	"Heroes and Villains"	4:53
3.	"Roll Plymouth Rock"	3:48
4.	"Barnyard"	0:58
5.	"Old Master Painter" / "You Are My Sunshine" (Haven Gillespie, Beasley Smith)	1:04
6.	"Cabin Essence"	3:27
7.	"Wonderful"	2:07
8.	"Song for Children"	2:16
9.	"Child Is Father of the Man"	2:18
10.	"Surf's Up"	4:07
11.	"I'm in Great Shape" / "I Wanna Be Around" / "Workshop" (Wilson, Parks, Johnny Mercer, Sadie Vimmerstedt)	1:56
12.	"Vega-Tables"	2:19
13.	"On a Holiday"	2:36
14.	"Wind Chimes"	2:54
15.	"Mrs. O'Leary's Cow" (Wilson)	2:27
16.	"In Blue Hawaii"	3:00
17.	"Good Vibrations" (Wilson, Tony Asher, Love)	4:36
Total length:		46:49

2011: The Smile Sessions – sequenced by Mark Linett, Alan Boyd, Dennis Wolfe
No.	Title	Length
1.	"Our Prayer" (Wilson)	1:05
2.	"Gee" (Davis, Levy)	0:51
3.	"Heroes and Villains"	4:52
4.	"Do You Like Worms (Roll Plymouth Rock)"	3:35
5.	"I'm in Great Shape"	0:28
6.	"Barnyard"	0:48
7.	"My Only Sunshine" ("The Old Master Painter" / "You Are My Sunshine"; Gillespie, Davis, Mitchell)	1:55
8.	"Cabin Essence"	3:30
9.	"Wonderful"	2:04
10.	"Look (Song for Children)" (Wilson)	2:31
11.	"Child Is Father of the Man"	2:10
12.	"Surf's Up"	4:12
13.	"I Wanna Be Around / Workshop" (Mercer, Wilson)	1:23
14.	"Vega-Tables"	3:49
15.	"Holidays" (Wilson)	2:32
16.	"Wind Chimes" (Wilson)	3:06
17.	"The Elements: Fire (Mrs. O'Leary's Cow)" (Wilson)	2:35
18.	"Love to Say Dada" (Wilson)	2:32
19.	"Good Vibrations" (Wilson, Love)	4:15
Total length:		48:03

== Bibliography ==
- Badman, Keith (2004). The Beach Boys: The Definitive Diary of America's Greatest Band, on Stage and in the Studio. Backbeat Books. ISBN 978-0-87930-818-6.
- Bogdanov, Vladimir; Woodstra, Chris; Erlewine, Stephen Thomas, eds. (2002). All Music Guide to Rock: The Definitive Guide to Rock, Pop, and Soul. Backbeat Books. ISBN 978-0-87930-653-3.
- Carlin, Peter Ames (2006). Catch a Wave: The Rise, Fall, and Redemption of the Beach Boys' Brian Wilson. Rodale. ISBN 978-1-59486-320-2.
- Carter, Dale (2016). "Into the Mystic? The Undergrounding of Brian Wilson, 1964–1967". In Lambert, Philip (ed.). Good Vibrations: Brian Wilson and the Beach Boys in Critical Perspective. University of Michigan Press. ISBN 978-0-472-11995-0.
- Carter, Dale (2021). Reading Smile: History, Myth and American Identity in Brian Wilson and Van Dyke Parks' Long-Lost Album. Abingdon, Oxon: Routledge. ISBN 9780367622862.
- Courrier, Kevin (2005). Randy Newman's American Dreams. ECW Press. ISBN 978-1-55022-690-4.
- Dillon, Mark (2012). Fifty Sides of the Beach Boys. Toronto, Ont.: ECW Press. ISBN 978-1-77041-071-8.
- Doggett, Peter (1997). "Smile: The Great Lost Album". In Abbott, Kingsley (ed.). Back to the Beach: A Brian Wilson and the Beach Boys Reader. Helter Skelter. ISBN 978-1-900924-02-3.
- Doggett, Peter (2015). Electric Shock: From the Gramophone to the iPhone: 125 Years of Pop Music. London: The Bodley Head. ISBN 978-1-84792-218-2.
- Flory, Andrew (2016). "Fandom and Ontology in Smile". In Lambert, Philip (ed.). Good Vibrations: Brian Wilson and the Beach Boys in Critical Perspective. University of Michigan Press. ISBN 978-0-472-11995-0.
- Gaines, Steven (1986). Heroes and Villains: The True Story of The Beach Boys. New York: Da Capo Press. ISBN 0-306-80647-9.
- Granata, Charles L. (2003). Wouldn't it Be Nice: Brian Wilson and the Making of the Beach Boys' Pet Sounds. Chicago Review Press. ISBN 978-1-55652-507-0.
- Hall, Mitchell K. (May 9, 2014). The Emergence of Rock and Roll: Music and the Rise of American Youth Culture. Taylor & Francis. ISBN 978-1-135-05357-4.
- Harrison, Daniel (1997). "After Sundown: The Beach Boys' Experimental Music" (PDF). In Covach, John; Boone, Graeme M. (eds.). Understanding Rock: Essays in Musical Analysis. Oxford University Press. pp. 33–57. ISBN 978-0-19-988012-6.
- Heiser, Marshall (2021). Popular Music, Power and Play: Reframing Creative Practice. Bloomsbury Academic. ISBN 9781501385421.
- Henderson, Richard (2010). Van Dyke Parks' Song Cycle. Continuum. ISBN 978-0-8264-2917-9.
- Hepworth, David (2016). Never a Dull Moment: 1971 The Year That Rock Exploded. Henry Holt and Company. ISBN 978-1-62779-400-8.
- Heylin, Clinton (2007). The Act You've Known for All These Years: A Year in the Life of Sgt. Pepper and Friend (1st ed.). Canongate. ISBN 978-1-84195-918-4.
- Hoskyns, Barney (2009). Waiting for the Sun: A Rock 'n' Roll History of Los Angeles. Backbeat Books. ISBN 978-0-87930-943-5.
- Howard, David N. (2004). Sonic Alchemy: Visionary Music Producers and Their Maverick Recordings. Hal Leonard Corporation. ISBN 978-0-634-05560-7.
- Jones, Carys Wyn (2008). The Rock Canon: Canonical Values in the Reception of Rock Albums. Ashgate Publishing, Ltd. ISBN 978-0-7546-6244-0.
- Kent, Nick (1995) [1975]. "The Last Beach Movie: Brian Wilson 1942–". In Priore, Domenic (ed.). Look, Listen, Vibrate, Smile!. Last Gasp. pp. 262–267. ISBN 0-86719-417-0.
- Kent, Nick (2009). "The Last Beach Movie Revisited: The Life of Brian Wilson". The Dark Stuff: Selected Writings on Rock Music. Da Capo Press. ISBN 978-0-7867-3074-2.
- Lambert, Philip (2007). Inside the Music of Brian Wilson: the Songs, Sounds, and Influences of the Beach Boys' Founding Genius. Continuum. ISBN 978-0-8264-1876-0.
- Lambert, Philip (March 2008). "Brian Wilson's Pet Sounds". Twentieth-Century Music. 5 (1). Cambridge University Press: 109–133. doi:10.1017/S1478572208000625. S2CID 162871617.
- Lambert, Philip, ed. (2016). Good Vibrations: Brian Wilson and the Beach Boys in Critical Perspective. University of Michigan Press. doi:10.3998/mpub.9275965. ISBN 978-0-472-11995-0.
- Leaf, David (1978). The Beach Boys and the California Myth. Grosset & Dunlap. ISBN 978-0-448-14626-3.
- Leaf, David (2025). SMiLE: The Rise, Fall, and Resurrection of Brian Wilson. Omnibus Press. ISBN 978-1-915841-31-5.
- Love, Mike (2016). Good Vibrations: My Life as a Beach Boy. Penguin Publishing Group. ISBN 978-0-698-40886-9.
- Lowe, Kelly Fisher (2007). The Words and Music of Frank Zappa. U of Nebraska Press. ISBN 978-0-8032-6005-4.
- Marsh, Dave (1983). "The Beach Boys". In Marsh, Dave; Swenson, John (eds.). The New Rolling Stone Record Guide. New York, NY: Random House/Rolling Stone Press. pp. 29–31. ISBN 0-394-72107-1.
- Matijas-Mecca, Christian (2017). The Words and Music of Brian Wilson. ABC-CLIO. ISBN 978-1-4408-3899-6.
- Moore, Allan F. (2016). Song Means: Analysing and Interpreting Recorded Popular Song. Routledge. ISBN 978-1-317-05265-4.
- Preiss, Byron (1979). The Beach Boys. Ballantine Books. ISBN 978-0-345-27398-7.
- Prendergast, Mark (2003). The Ambient Century: From Mahler to Moby – The Evolution of Sound in the Electronic Age. New York, NY: Bloomsbury. ISBN 1-58234-323-3.
- Priore, Domenic, ed. (1995). Look, Listen, Vibrate, Smile!. Last Gasp. ISBN 0-86719-417-0.
- Priore, Domenic (2005). Smile: The Story of Brian Wilson's Lost Masterpiece. London: Sanctuary. ISBN 1-86074-627-6.
- Rodriguez, Robert (2012). Revolver: How the Beatles Reimagined Rock 'n' Roll. Milwaukee, WI: Backbeat Books. ISBN 978-1-61713-009-0.
- Rodriguez, Robert (2020). "Getting Back". In Womack, Kenneth (ed.). The Beatles in Context. New York, NY: Cambridge University Press. pp. 217–229. ISBN 978-1-108-40952-0.
- Sanchez, Luis (2014). The Beach Boys' Smile. Bloomsbury Publishing. ISBN 978-1-62356-956-3.
- Schinder, Scott (2007). "The Beach Boys". In Schinder, Scott; Schwartz, Andy (eds.). Icons of Rock: An Encyclopedia of the Legends Who Changed Music Forever. Westport, Connecticut: Greenwood Press. ISBN 978-0-313-33845-8.
- Sellars, Jeff, ed. (2015). God Only Knows: Faith, Hope, Love, and The Beach Boys. Wipf and Stock Publishers. ISBN 978-1-4982-0767-6.
- Segretto, Mike (2022). 33 1/3 Revolutions Per Minute: A Critical Trip Through the Rock LP Era, 1955–1999. Rowman & Littlefield. ISBN 9781493064601.
- Starr, Larry (2007) [first published in 2006]. American Popular Music: From Minstrelsy to MP3 (2nd ed.). New York: Oxford University Press. ISBN 9780195300536.
- Starr, Larry (2016). "A Listener's Smile". In Lambert, Philip (ed.). Good Vibrations: Brian Wilson and the Beach Boys in Critical Perspective. University of Michigan Press. ISBN 978-0-472-11995-0.
- Stebbins, Jon (2000). Dennis Wilson: The Real Beach Boy. ECW Press. ISBN 978-1-55022-404-7.
- Stebbins, Jon (2011). The Beach Boys FAQ: All That's Left to Know About America's Band. Backbeat Books. ISBN 978-1-4584-2914-8.
- Tobler, John (1978). The Beach Boys. Chartwell Books. ISBN 0890091749.
- Toop, David (1995). Ocean of Sound: Aether Talk, Ambient Sound and Imaginary Worlds (Reprinted ed.). London: Serpent's Tail. ISBN 978-1-85242-382-7.
- Toop, David (1999). Exotica: Fabricated Soundscapes in a Real World: Fabricated Soundscapes in the Real World (1. publ. ed.). London: Serpent's Tail. ISBN 978-1-85242-595-1.
- Trynka, Paul; Bacon, Tony (1996). Rock Hardware. Balafon Books. ISBN 978-0-87930-428-7.
- White, Timothy (1996). The Nearest Faraway Place: Brian Wilson, the Beach Boys, and the Southern Californian Experience. Macmillan. ISBN 0-333-64937-0.
- Williams, Paul; Anderle, David (1995) [1968]. "A Celebration of Wild Honey". In Priore, Domenic (ed.). Look, Listen, Vibrate, Smile!. Last Gasp. pp. 220–241. ISBN 0-86719-417-0.
- Williams, Paul, ed. (1997). "Smile Is Done (conversation with David Anderle, part IV, 3/97". Brian Wilson & The Beach Boys How Deep Is The Ocean?. Omnibus Press. ISBN 0-7119-6197-2.
- Williams, Paul (2010). Back to the Miracle Factory. Tom Doherty Associates. ISBN 978-1-4299-8243-6.
- Wilson, Brian; Greenman, Ben (2016). I Am Brian Wilson: A Memoir. Da Capo Press. ISBN 978-0-306-82307-7.
