= Smiley Smile =

Studio album by the Beach Boys
- Released: September 18, 1967
- Recorded: February 17, 1966 – July 14, 1967
- Studios: Beach Boys (Los Angeles); Wally Heider; Western; Columbia; Sound Recorders (Hollywood)
- Genres: Lo-fi; psychedelia; avant-garde; bedroom pop; minimal
- Length: 27:36
- Label: Brother/Capitol
- Producer: The Beach Boys

The Beach Boys chronology
Best of the Beach Boys Vol. 2 (1967)	Smiley Smile (1967)	Wild Honey (1967)

Singles from Smiley Smile
- 1. "Heroes and Villains" Released: July 24, 1967; 2. "Gettin' Hungry" Released: August 28, 1967

Smiley Smile is the twelfth studio album by the American rock band the Beach Boys, released on September 18, 1967. Conceived as a simpler and more relaxed version of their unfinished Smile album, Smiley Smile is distinguished for its homespun arrangements, "stoned" aesthetic, and lo-fi production. It was largely recorded in June and July 1967 at principal songwriter Brian Wilson's makeshift home studio using radio broadcasting equipment, a detuned piano, electronic bass, melodica, found objects for percussion, and a Baldwin theater organ. The unconventional recording process juxtaposed an experimental party-like atmosphere with disjointed music sequences, combining the engineering methods of "Good Vibrations" (1966) with the loose feeling of Beach Boys' Party! (1965). Despite leading these sessions, Wilson deliberately credited the album's production to the group collectively for the first time.

After settling payment disputes with Capitol Records, Smiley Smile was distributed in collaboration with Brother Records, the band's new self-owned record company. Critics and fans generally received the album and its lead single, "Heroes and Villains", with confusion and disappointment. The album reached number 9 on UK record charts, but sold poorly in the U.S., peaking at number 41—the band's lowest chart placement to that point. A second single, "Gettin' Hungry", was credited to Wilson and Mike Love and failed to chart. Smile was left incomplete as the band immediately moved onto the recording of Lei'd in Hawaii, an unfinished live album with performances in the style of Smiley Smile.

Smiley Smile has since become a critical and cult favorite, influencing the development of the lo-fi, ambient, and bedroom pop genres. It is often regarded as one of the finest chill-out albums for its positive effects on listeners experiencing an LSD comedown, a usage adopted by at least one drug clinic. In 1974, it was ranked number 64 in NME's list of the greatest albums of all time. Outtakes and session highlights from the album were included on the compilations The Smile Sessions (2011) and 1967 – Sunshine Tomorrow (2017).

== Background ==
The Beach Boys' album Pet Sounds, issued on May 16, 1966, was massively influential upon its release, containing lush and sophisticated orchestral arrangements that raised the band's prestige to the top level of rock innovators. Early reviews for the album in the US ranged from negative to tentatively positive, but the reception from music journalists in the UK was very favorable. The group had recently employed the Beatles' former press officer Derek Taylor as their publicist. Bothered by the Beach Boys' popular association with surf culture, leader and songwriter Brian Wilson requested that Taylor rebrand the group, resulting in Taylor spearheading a media campaign that proclaimed Wilson to be a musical genius.

In October 1966, the group followed up Pet Sounds with "Good Vibrations", a laboriously produced single that achieved major international success. By then, an album titled Smile had been conceived as an extension of that song's recording approach, with Wilson composing music in collaboration with lyricist Van Dyke Parks. Wilson envisioned Smile as an outlet for all of his intellectual occupations, such as his fascination with spirituality and its relationship to humor and laughter. He told Melody Maker: "Our new album will be better than Pet Sounds. It will be as much an improvement over Sounds as that was over [our 1965 album] Summer Days." By the end of the year, NME conducted an annual reader's poll that placed the Beach Boys as the world's top vocal group, ahead of the Beatles and the Rolling Stones.

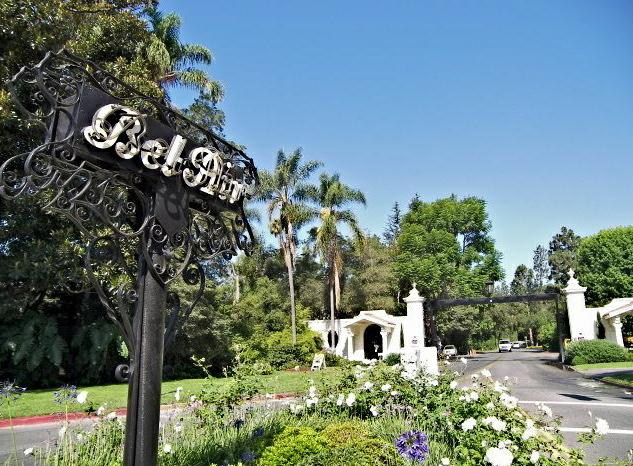
Bel Air, Los Angeles, where Brian Wilson relocated to in early 1967 and set up a home studio.

Wilson enlisted talent manager David Anderle in the formation of Brother Records, an independent label, with the intention of giving "entirely new concepts to the recording industry, and to give the Beach Boys total creative and promotional control over their product", according to Anderle. A February 1967 lawsuit seeking $255,000 (equivalent to $2.46 million in 2025) was launched against Capitol Records over neglected royalty payments. Within the lawsuit, there was also an attempt to terminate the band's contract with Capitol before its November 1969 expiration. In April 1967, Wilson and his wife put their Beverly Hills home up for sale and took residence at a newly purchased mansion in Bel Air. Wilson also set to work on constructing a personal home studio.

Parks permanently withdrew from the project in April, with Anderle following suit weeks later. Between mid-April and early May, Wilson took a four-week break from studio recording. On April 26, Carl Wilson was arrested for refusing his draft into the US Army and later released on bail. On April 28, in an effort to promote the group's upcoming UK tour, EMI issued the single "Then I Kissed Her" to the chagrin of the band, who did not approve the release. On May 6, a week after stating that Smile was to be released "any moment", Taylor announced in Disc & Music Echo that the album had been "scrapped" by Wilson. However, Taylor's assertion of the album's cancellation at that point was likely to be spurious. (Note: It is unlikely that Brian was aware of Taylor's announcement. In a June 1967 issue of Hit Parader, Dennis reported that the group were still recording Smile and that the album was "50% done".) The Beach Boys were still under pressure and a contractual obligation to deliver an album to Capitol. For most of May, the touring group embarked on a run of shows in Europe while Brian resumed scheduling recording sessions at professional studios, some of which were cancelled on short notice.

Brian just said, "I can't do this. We're going to make a homespun version of it instead. We're just going to take it easy. I'll get in the pool and sing. Or let's go in the gym and do our parts." That was Smiley Smile.

— Carl Wilson

Throughout 1967, Wilson's public image was reduced to that of an "eccentric" figure as a multitude of revolutionary rock albums were released to an anxious and maturing youth market. (Note: From February to May 1967, this included Jefferson Airplane's Surrealistic Pillow, the Jimi Hendrix Experience's Are You Experienced, and the Velvet Underground's The Velvet Underground and Nico. In the weeks following Smiley Smile's release, "three distinct, but equally important albums" also came out: Cream's Disraeli Gears, the Who's The Who Sell Out, and the Moody Blues' Days of Future Passed.) For a time, the Beach Boys had been the Beatles' chief rivals, and Wilson was concerned that if Smile followed in the wake of another critically successful release by the Beatles, then his album would be received with unjust comparisons. His race was effectively lost when the Beatles released Sgt. Pepper's Lonely Hearts Club Band (May 1967). (Note: In retrospect, rock critic Paul Williams wrote that Anderle's idea to form Brother Records was reasonable, "but the time it takes to put this type of thing through the courts was not conducive to the production race that was important during this period of radical change in pop." A similar fate befell the Rolling Stones when they released Their Satanic Majesties Request, which was viewed as a pretentious, poorly conceived attempt to outdo the Beatles and Sgt. Pepper's. When asked in a 1987 Rolling Stone interview whether Smile would have topped the Beatles' Sgt. Pepper, Wilson replied: "No. It wouldn't have come close. Sgt. Pepper would have kicked our ass.") By June, Wilson declared to his bandmates that most of the material recorded for Smile would be abandoned. In an interview conducted in January 1968, he intimated that he had run out of ideas "in a conventional sense" and had been "about ready to die" before Smiley Smile. He said: "I decided not to try any more, and not try and do such great things."

== Modular approach and recording atmosphere ==
"Vegetables" (2012 stereo mix)
Much of Smiley Smile uses sparse instrumentation enhanced by inventive vocal arrangements and quirky elements, such as celery bites for percussion.

Since the recording of "Good Vibrations" in 1966, Wilson had established a new method of operation. Instead of working on whole songs with clear large-scale syntactical structures, Wilson limited himself to recording short interchangeable fragments (or "modules"). Through the method of tape splicing, each fragment could then be assembled into a linear sequence, allowing any number of larger structures and divergent moods to be produced at a later time. Smiley Smile continued this approach. The album also continued Brian's exploration of "party tracks"—a form of music which includes the sounds of people shouting and making noises, as if at a party. (Note: The Beatles' "Yellow Submarine" and Bob Dylan's "Rainy Day Women#12 and 35" (1966) were similar examples of party tracks.) Brian had enacted this approach with Beach Boys' Party! in 1965, thereby mixing that record's style with the modular composition method he devised for "Good Vibrations".

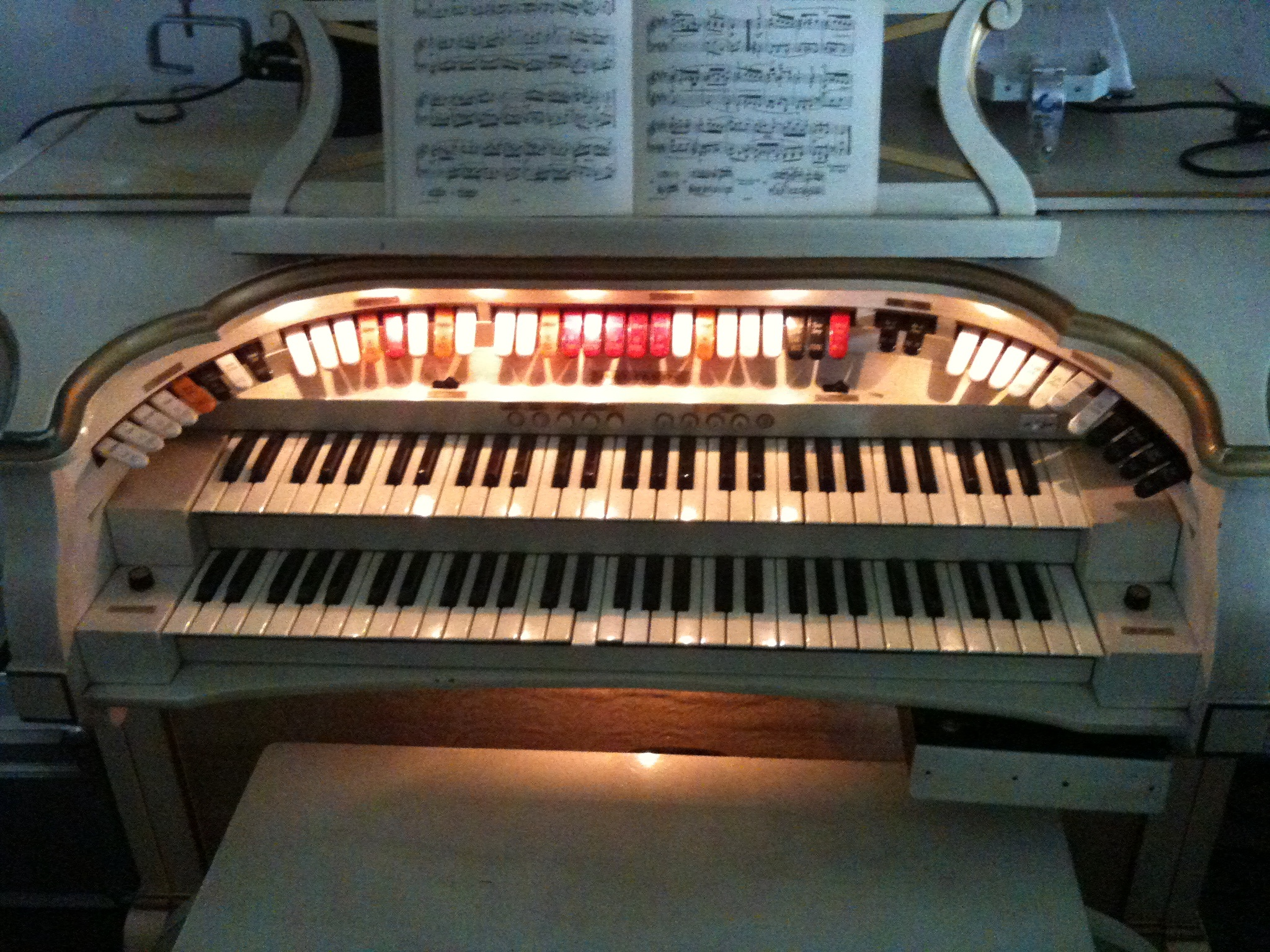
The sound of Wilson's new Baldwin organ (model pictured) became the central timbre on Smiley Smile.

Most of Smiley Smile was recorded at Brian's improvised home studio from June 3 to July 14, 1967. The group had held a few of the early sessions at Hollywood Sound Recorders and Western Studios. All sessions after June 11 were conducted at the home studio. The core instrumentation at these sessions consisted of organ, honky-tonk piano, and electronic bass played by the Beach Boys themselves, rather than the session musicians employed in much of their previous work. Brian became obsessed with his electric theatre organ during the album's recording, specifically, the Baldwin HT-2 model, usually with minimum use of the instrument's stops, resulting in a more minimalist approach to the new arrangements. Most of the piano was played by Brian, and most of the bass was played by Carl.

It was the first album for which production was credited to the entire group, instead of Brian alone. Dennis Wilson explained: "He wanted it that way. He said 'It's produced by the Beach Boys.'" (Note: In 1976, Brian denied that it was a conscious decision for the group to become more democratic.) When asked if Brian was "still the producer of Smiley Smile", Carl answered, "Most definitely." He described Smiley Smile as an improvised, low-effort affair that was "more like a 'jam' album." Brian acknowledged: "We had done about six months work on another thing, but we jumped and ended up doing the entire thing here at the house with an entirely different mood and approach than what we originally started out with." When questioned on why the band took the approach they did, he stated, "We just had a particular atmosphere that we were working in that inspired the particular kind of things that were on the album." He said that he did not "have any paranoia feelings" recording the album: "[W]e had so much fun. The Smiley Smile era was so great, it was unbelievable. Personally, spiritually, everything, it was great."

"Fall Breaks and Back to Winter (W. Woodpecker Symphony)" (2012 stereo mix)
Harrison notes that "The lack of formal or harmonic development makes the listener focus upon other qualities such as instrumentation, timbre, and reverberation. A concentrated listening effort thus goes quickly to subtle details."

According to music theorist Daniel Harrison, Smiley Smile is not a work of rock music as the term was understood in 1967, and that portions of the album "can be thought of as a kind of protominimal rock music". In his book about psychedelic music, author Jim DeRogatis referred to Smiley Smile as a work of the "ultimate psychedelic rock library". Conversely, Stylus Magazine's Edwin Faust wrote in 2003 that the album "embraces the listener with a drugged out sincerity; a feat never accomplished by the more pretentious and heavy-handed psychedelia of that era. It is for this reason Smiley Smile flows so well with the more experimental pop of today".

Mike Love, recalling how "She's Goin' Bald" had been written about fellatio, commented: "We were stoned out of our heads. We were laughing our asses off when we recorded that stuff." (Note: In his 2016 memoir, he said of such recording sessions, "these were not pleasant memories for any of us." Music journalist Domenic Priore writes that when the Beach Boys were taken out of professional studios, "the discipline of the clock, rates and overtime disappeared".) Dennis remembered the album as "the most fun thing we ever did." Bruce Johnston did not participate in most of these sessions and later called the work "very spacy" and "weird", but "so subtle and so damn innovative."

== Differences from Smile ==
"Wonderful" (2012 stereo mix)
Academic Larry Starr describes "Wonderful" as the album's strangest Smile reworking, an example of the "unexpected juxtapositions of textures and formal elements" that had been executed like an "inadequately edited home movie rather than that of well-articulated musical conceptions".

Carl Wilson famously compared Smiley Smile to "a bunt instead of a grand slam". From the vast sum of material Brian had recorded for Smile, only portions of the backing track for "Heroes and Villains" (recorded October 1966) and the coda for "Vegetables" (recorded April 1967) were used for Smiley Smile. Comparing Brian's original Smile mixes with the Smiley Smile version of "Heroes and Villains", Al Jardine called it "a pale facsimile ... Brian re-invented the song for this record ... He purposefully under-produced the song." "Good Vibrations", which was recorded sporadically from February to September 1966, appears with no differences from the original single. Brian reportedly objected to the placement of "Good Vibrations" on Smiley Smile, but for the first time, he was outvoted by his bandmates, who insisted on its inclusion.

"Wind Chimes", "Wonderful", and most parts of "Vegetables" were completely rerecorded with scaled-down arrangements. "Vegetables" was reworked as a sort of campfire song, while "Wonderful" traded its harpsichord and trumpet for a haphazardly-played organ, high-pitched backing vocals, and a doo-wop sing-along section. The marimbas in "Wind Chimes" were replaced by organ and dissonant noise. Other tracks only extracted minor elements, such as a melody line, from other Smile pieces. "She's Goin' Bald" borrows the verse melody from a Smile fragment known as "He Gives Speeches", "With Me Tonight" is a variation on "Vegetables", and "Fall Breaks and Back to Winter (W. Woodpecker Symphony)" lifts a recurring melodic hook from "Fire". (Note: The new "Wind Chimes" coda also shares the same melody as the ending of "Holidays", a Smile instrumental, while "Fall Breaks and Back to Winter" recycles the music quotation of Woody Woodpecker's laugh heard in "Surf's Up".)

Despite reports that Smile had been shelved for being "too weird", there was no attempt by the band to make the musical content on Smiley Smile appear less bizarre for their established fanbase. David Anderle thought that Brian's intention was "to salvage as much of Smile as he could and at the same time immediately go into his [long-discussed] humor album." According to a contemporary Hullabaloo article, "The title, suggested by [Wilson's cousin] Barry Turnbull, reflects the album's happy concept, it is taken from the Indian aphorism, 'The smile that you send out returns to you.'" The cover artwork featured a new illustration of Frank Holmes' Smile Shoppe, this time located in the middle of an overgrown jungle.

Smiley Smile was produced without any direct involvement from Van Dyke Parks. The only songs that appeared to have no connection to the original Smile album were "Little Pad" and "Gettin' Hungry". In addition, while the Beatles' Paul McCartney was present at an April 1967 session for "Vegetables", the recording where he had reportedly supplied celery crunching sounds was not used on Smiley Smile.

== Technical aspects and mixdown ==
Smiley Smile was recorded with an eight-track tape machine, with all the different musical sections spread out across numerous reels of tape. In other words, intros, verses, choruses, and endings were each allocated their own reel. The Beach Boys recorded using what was predominantly radio broadcasting equipment, which lacked many of the technical elements and effects found in an established studio. The studio set up at Brian's house was, in its mid-1967 incarnation used for Smiley Smile, in its infancy. Due to the sporadic nature at which Brian decided to produce the record at his home, there was little time to fully outfit the Bel Air residence as a properly-equipped recording studio.

Tracks were typically constructed around a performance of Wilson playing piano that was usually mixed out of the final recording. This process was equivalent to the use of click tracks a decade before they were common. Some recording accidents were used to their advantage, such as in "With Me Tonight", which contains an informal link between the verse and chorus by way of a voice saying "good", as in "good take", spoken by the band's friend Arny Geller from the control room. Tape manipulation was another prominent feature, with varispeed being applied to a few vocals. On "She's Goin' Bald", a new device called the Eltro Information Rate Changer was used to raise the pitch of the group's vocals without affecting the tempo.

The home set-up was moved between different areas as the sessions progressed. This led to unconventional ways of achieving particular sounds at the home, such as a replacement for what would be achieved by an echo chamber. The album's engineer Jim Lockert recalled how "Brian's swimming pool had a leak in it and was empty, so we put a microphone in the bottom of this damn near Olympic-size pool and the guys laid down inside the pool and sang so the sound would go down the wall of the concrete pool into the microphone – and that was part of the vocals on one of those songs." (Note: Dennis mentioned that it was "Heroes and Villains" that was recorded in a swimming pool.) Some vocals were also tracked in the shower.

Lockert detailed a unique and labor-intensive process for the final mixing session of the album that began at five o'clock one evening and concluded the following morning at Wally Heider's Studio 3 in Hollywood. The mixing strategy involved sequentially mixing the introduction and first verse of each song directly to a two-track tape. Rather than creating copies for assembly, the team would then erase the vocals from the mixed segment, record the harmony and lead parts for the subsequent verse, and mix it down to the same tape. This meticulous approach was repeated for each section of the song, ensuring that by the end of the session, the album was fully mixed and edited. Lockert recalled, "One of the guys from Wally Heider was my second engineer and he said, 'Well, I never believed in miracles but I saw one tonight.' That’s the way they did it. It wasn't my idea. They mixed it chorus and verse, chorus and verse and intro, and all the levels had to match."

== Release ==
The Beach Boys were initially involved in the conception of the Monterey Pop Festival, which was held in June 1967. At the last minute, the band announced that they could not appear at the festival for reasons pertaining to Carl's military draft and their commitments to finish "Heroes and Villains" for Capitol. Derek Taylor, who had terminated his employment with the group to focus on the festival's organization, remembered that dropping out of the program "undoubtedly set the band in a very bad light. They were certainly heavily criticized at the time for it. It seemed rather like an admission of defeat." Biographer David Leaf explained: "Monterey was a gathering place for the 'far out' sounds of the 'new' rock ... and it is thought that this non-appearance was what really turned the 'underground' tide against them." Detractors referred to the band as the "Bleach Boys" and "the California Hypes" as the media focus shifted from Los Angeles to the happenings in San Francisco.

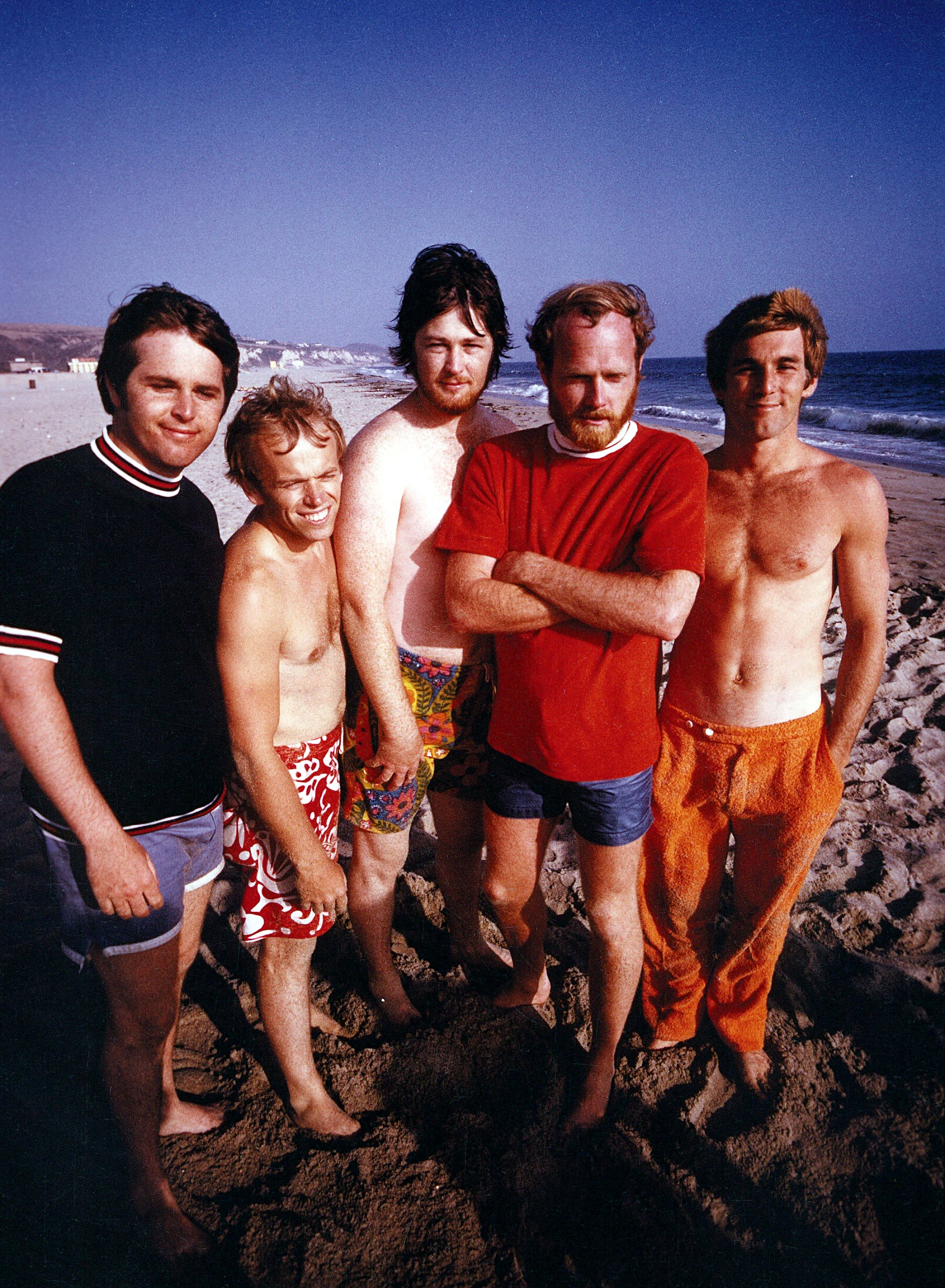
The group at Zuma Beach in Malibu, July 1967

The Capitol lawsuit was eventually settled out of court, with the Beach Boys receiving the royalties owed in exchange for Brother Records to distribute through Capitol Records, along with a guarantee that the band produce at least one million dollars profit. An official announcement of the resolution was made on July 18. Capitol A&R director Karl Engemann began circulating a memo, dated July 25, in which Smiley Smile was referred to as a stopgap for Smile. The memo also discussed conversations between him and Wilson pertaining to the release of a 10-track Smile album, which would not have included the songs "Heroes and Villains" or "Vegetables". (Note: Music historian Andrew Doe speculates that the memo may have reflected Brian "being his usual agreeable self and telling people what they wanted to hear ... or a simple misunderstanding.") In July, two singles were issued on the Brother imprint: "Heroes and Villains" and "Gettin' Hungry". (Note: Their respective B-sides were "You're Welcome" and "Devoted to You", both non-album tracks. The latter had been released on Beach Boys' Party! two years earlier.) The former peaked at number 12 on the Billboard Hot 100. The latter was not credited to the Beach Boys, but instead to Brian Wilson and Mike Love.

Smile was never delivered; instead, the group played two shows at an auditorium in Honolulu, which were filmed and recorded with the intention of releasing a live album, Lei'd in Hawaii. On stage, the band performed "Heroes and Villains" and "Gettin' Hungry", and rearranged their past hits in the style of Smiley Smile. (Note: Priore writes that the engagement was effectively the band's "attempt to make up" for cancelling their gig at Monterey.) Bruce Johnston, who was absent for most of the Smiley Smile recording sessions, did not accompany the group, although Brian did. In early August, Johnston told the British press that he had heard Smiley Smile, and when asked about Smile, said that the album would be released "within the next two months."

On September 18, 1967, Smiley Smile was released in the US. The LP peaked at number 41 on the Billboard charts, making it their worst-selling album to that date. (Note: Their 1962 debut Surfin' Safari reached 32.) It spent most of its 21-week chart time bubbling under 100 and 197. When released in the UK in November, it performed better, reaching number 9 on the Record Retailer LPs Chart. During their annual Thanksgiving tour of the US, the band did not perform any of the tracks on Smiley Smile except "Good Vibrations". In a December interview, Mike Love acknowledged that Smiley Smile had "baffled and mystified" the public and that the band "had this feeling that we were going too far, losing touch I guess." He promised that their next album, then slated to be Wild Honey, would bring the group "back more into reality".

== Initial reviews ==
In the description of journalist Nick Kent, Smiley Smile "appeared like the single most underwhelming musical statement of the sixties". It was a "major disappointment" for fans, many of whom had expected a work similar to Pet Sounds and the Beatles' Sgt. Pepper. According to writer Scott Schinder, the LP was released to "general incomprehension. While Smile may have divided the Beach Boys' fans had it been released, Smiley Smile merely baffled them." Anderle said that whatever new fans the group had brought with Pet Sounds were "immediately lost with the release of 'Heroes of Villains,' then with the album [Smiley Smile]." Biographer Keith Badman writes that the music press responded by "effectively blacklisting the band, refusing to review their latest records, or reviewing them long after they have been released."

"Undoubtedly the worst album ever released by The Beach Boys", Melody Maker wrote. "Prestige has been seriously damaged." A review in Hit Parader praised the album for "probably [having] more a cappella harmony than on any album since the fall of the singing-group era in the late 1950s", but reserved that they "still like Pet Sounds better". (Note: The column entry was juxtaposed with a review for Pink Floyd's debut LP Piper at the Gates of Dawn. After Piper, co-founder and songwriter Syd Barrett resigned from the band's live performances and was known as "Pink Floyd's Brian Wilson" only to suffer a mental breakdown in the middle of their second album and leave the band completely.) NME wrote, "By the standards which this group has set itself, it's more than a grade disappointing." Hi Fidelity said: "... they are making the psychedelic route ... perhaps in the unforgettable city of Fresno. Until they reach the San Francisco Bay Bridge or return to the shores of Malibu ... their work can only receive partial approval."

More favorably, Record Mirror's Wesley Laine predicted that Smiley Smile would "probably go to the top of the LP charts". He felt that it contained better songs "on the whole" than Pet Sounds, as well as "extremely clever and insiduous ... production and arrangements [that] fall into the current psychedelic bag without being blatantly acidy." The Milwaukee Sentinel praised the LP as "probably the most valuable contribution to rock since the Beatles Revolver" and for being unlike anything the Beatles had done. Cheetah gave the album a rave review, observing that "the mood is rather childlike (not childish)—the kind of innocence that shows on the album cover, with its Rousseau-like animals and forest, and the smoke from the cabin chimney spelling out the title. ... The expression that emerges from this music is very strange: it's a very personal mood." (Note: The same review bemoaned the absence of "Surf's Up", writing that the song is "better than anything that is on the album and would have provided the same emotional catharsis as that 'A Day in the Life' provides for Sgt. Pepper.") New York Times journalist Richard Goldstein rued that "the album is a memorable, if disjointed experience, and a truly religious one as well. One must decide for oneself what the sermon is worth listening for." (Note: Goldstein later suggested that his editor removed comparisons Goldstein had made between the album and Fauré's Requiem. When Goldstein found the opportunity to ask Wilson about the Fauré connection, accordingly, "He [Brian] looked like I had pulled a knife on him. 'I never heard of that guy,' he muttered.") In his May 1968 column in Esquire, Robert Christgau praised the minimalism of Smiley Smile, characterizing the record as "slight" and calling the deliberately uncommercial sound of the album "unique and almost perfect".

Controversy involving whether the band was to be taken as a serious rock group followed them into the next year. On December 14, 1967, Rolling Stone editor and co-founder Jann Wenner printed an influential article that denounced Wilson's "genius" label, which he called a "promotional shuck", and the Beach Boys themselves, which he called "one prominent example of a group that has gotten hung up on trying to catch The Beatles". He wrote that "for some reason, [Smiley Smile] just doesn't make it ... [the songs] just don't move you. Other than displaying Brian Wilson's virtuosity for production, they are pointless." In February 1968, a Rolling Stone reviewer referred to the album as a "disaster" and an "abortive attempt to match the talents of Lennon and McCartney."

== Aftermath and archival releases ==
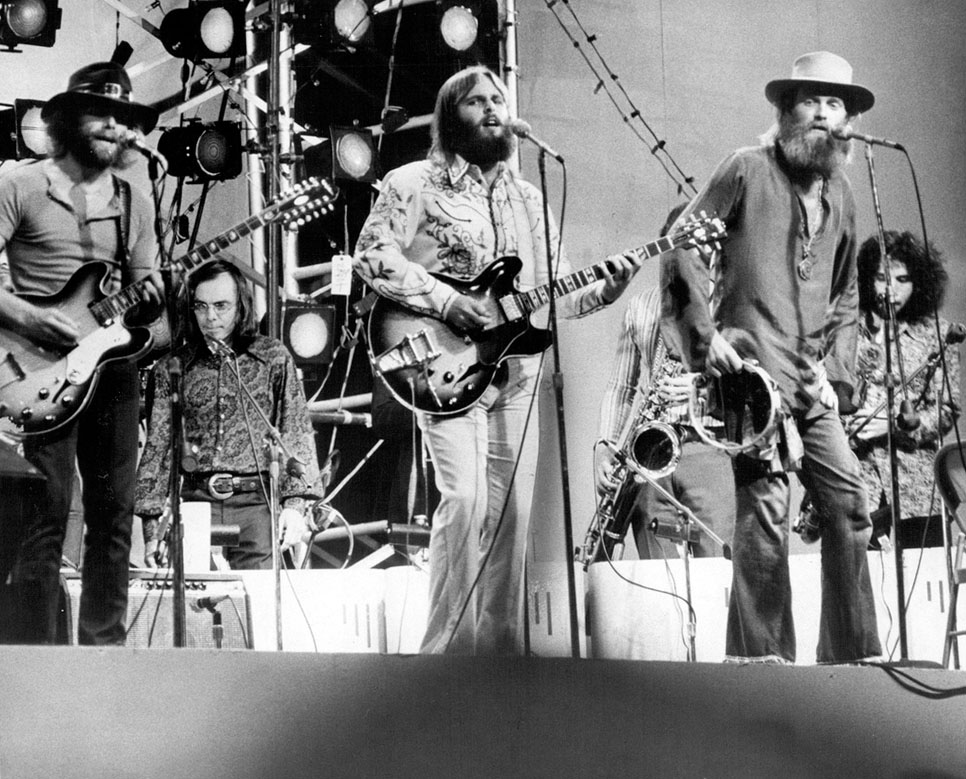
The Beach Boys performing "Heroes and Villains" at Central Park, 1971

Smiley Smile became the first in a trilogy of lo-fi Beach Boys albums (preceding Wild Honey and Friends) and the first in a seven-year string of under-performing Beach Boys albums (ending with the 1974 compilation Endless Summer). The Smile era is generally viewed as the ending of the Beach Boys' most artistically creative period, and the point after which Brian began gradually relinquishing his hold as the group's creative leader.

Commenting on Smiley Smile in retrospect, Bruce Johnston said it was "a thousand times better than the [original Smile] ... It's just the most underrated album in the whole catalog for me." Dennis Wilson said, "It was not as ambitious as Pet Sounds was. But ... I listened to it in a jungle in Africa and it sounded great." Conversely, Al Jardine felt that "there are some pretty cool songs on that album but I didn't like rehashing some of the Smile songs. That didn't work for me." Mike Love wrote, "Some of the songs we recorded could barely be called songs. They were chants, spacey fragments, weird sound effects. Every group produces at least one bad album ... I don't think Brian wanted to be associated with it either."

Much of the group's subsequent recordings from 1967 to 1970 followed similar experimental traditions as Smiley Smile – namely, through sparse instrumentation, a more relaxed ensemble, and a seeming inattention to production quality. Numerous session musicians have reported that the Beach Boys had not been a distraction to Brian's workflow when recording at established studios, but once the group made the home studio their primary base of operations, his bandmates became more integrated in the band's creative decisions. (Note: Session drummer Hal Blaine said, "I think the main period of hit-making ended when they put that studio in the home, because the other guys were around 'making decisions' and getting in the way.") Carl took Brian's place as the most musically dominant member, and Brian would not be credited as producer for another Beach Boys album until 1976's 15 Big Ones.

Smile material continued to trickle out in later releases, often as filler songs to offset Brian's unwillingness to contribute. "Cool, Cool Water", an outtake from Smiley Smile and Wild Honey sessions, was partially rerecorded and issued as the closing track for Sunflower (1970). (Note: "Cool, Cool Water" evolved from the Smile instrumental "Love to Say Dada".) When The Smile Sessions box set was released in 2011, co-producer Mark Linett acknowledged that "there's things that some people think – should Smiley Smile sessions be there – [with tracks such as] 'Can't Wait Too Long', we get into a very fuzzy area". (Note: "Can't Wait Too Long" is an unfinished song recorded between late 1967 and mid 1968. It was included as a bonus track in the 1990 reissue of Smiley Smile and Wild Honey. It may have evolved from a short vocal riff, "I Believe in Miracles", another outtake from Smiley Smile that frequently appears on bootlegs, where it is often paired with "Can't Wait Too Long".) In 2017, additional session highlights from the album were released on the rarities compilation 1967 – Sunshine Tomorrow. The compilation was followed several months later with two more digital-exclusive releases: 1967 – Sunshine Tomorrow 2: The Studio Sessions and 1967 – Live Sunshine.

== Reappraisal ==
Professional ratings
Review scores
Source	Rating
AllMusic	4/5 stars
Blender	5/5 stars
The Encyclopedia of Popular Music	4/5 stars
MusicHound	4.5/5 stars
Pitchfork	9.5/10
The Rolling Stone Album Guide	3/5 stars

Smiley Smile has since become a cult and critical favorite in the Beach Boys' catalog. In biographer Peter Ames Carlin's estimation, "the album's reputation improved with hindsight", particularly after the release of "stripped-down warts-and-all albums" by other artists, including Bob Dylan (John Wesley Harding, 1967) and the Beatles (The Beatles, 1968). Writing in 1971, Melody Maker's Richard Williams referred to Smiley Smile as "The Great Undiscovered Pop Album", one that had been "either ignored or dismissed by the reviewers." The album's prevailing negative response mellowed after the record was reissued in 1974 – the same year that the staff of NME ranked it as the 62nd greatest album of all time.

Since the mid-1970s, the album has developed a following that appreciates its low-fidelity production and considers it an essential entry in Wilson's oeuvre. It is considered a masterwork among fans of lo-fi art. Reviewing the album for AllMusic, Richie Unterberger called it a "rather nifty, if rather slight, effort that's plenty weird". Spencer Owen of Pitchfork deemed it "a near-masterpiece. Without any awareness of Smile's existence, this album could have been a contemporary classic ... and although the album isn't anywhere close to the sonic revolution that Sgt. Pepper had already brought, Wilson's innovative production and arrangements still bring out the best in every single track." Blender's Douglas Wolk called it "the Boys' psychedelic album — joltingly spare, druggy and funny, with the most gorgeous harmonies of their career."

Less favorably, Kent maintained that the album "undersold the worth" of Smile with "dumb pot-head skits, so-called healing chants and even some weird 'loony tunes' items straight out of a cut-rate Walt Disney soundtrack". The Guardian's Geoffrey Cannon viewed Parks' lyrics as "pretentious", believing that Parks "messed Brian up" during Smiley Smile. Paste's Bryan Rolli ranked it at number 2 in a list of the "10 Most Disappointing Follow-Up Albums", calling it a "disjointed collection of minimalist recordings and a capella bits that are not so much songs as fragments of a shattered psyche". In the 2004 edition of The Rolling Stone Album Guide, the reviewer described Smiley Smile as "inconsistent" and said that, given the context of its release in September 1967, "the album was like a strange throwback – it highlighted how out of touch these suburban California surfers had become with the psychedelic times." In his 2007 book The Act You've Known for All These Years: The Life, and Afterlife, of Sgt. Pepper, Clinton Heylin writes that the album "sounded like a [throwaway] contractual obligation" and, together with its commercial failure, confirmed "one of the most spectacular falls from grace of any sixties band".

In the 2000s, Smiley Smile began to be included in lists of "must-hear" albums compiled by various publications. In 2000, it was ranked number 415 in Colin Larkin's book of the All Time Top 1000 Albums. In a 2007 issue of Rolling Stone, Robert Christgau and David Fricke named it one of the 40 essential albums of 1967; Christgau declared: "Towering it's not; some kind of hit it is." In 2017, it was ranked number 118 on Pitchfork's list of greatest albums of the 1960s, where it was described as having "developed a small cult of its own, attracting those drawn to its stripped-down, highly spontaneous, and deeply stoned vibe."

== Impact and legacy ==
In later years, Smiley Smile became celebrated as one of the finest chill-out albums, and one that is suited for listening during an LSD comedown. At least one drug treatment center adopted the LP as a tool for comforting patients. Carl Wilson mentioned this clinic, located in Fort Worth, Texas, to the NME in 1970, saying, "They don't use any traditional medical treatment whatsoever. All they do is play the patient our Smiley Smile album and apparently this acts as a soothing remedy which relaxes them and helps them to recover completely from their trip."

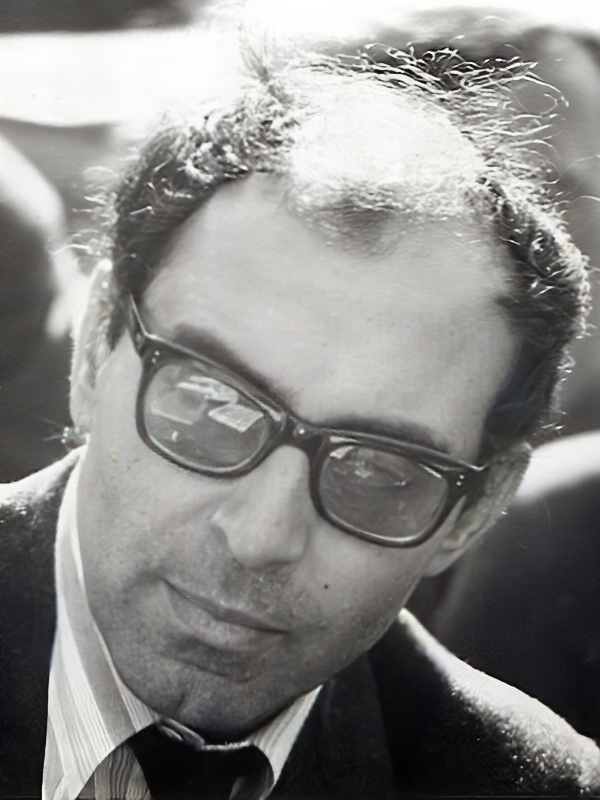
Elements of the album have been compared to the filmmaking style of Jean-Luc Godard

Music theorist Daniel Harrison writes that Smiley Smile may be regarded as a piece akin to art music within the Western classical tradition, highlighting its pioneering contributions to the rock genre as comparable to the introduction of unconventional techniques, such as atonality, in classical music. (Note: He parallels the album's experimental essence with that found in Arnold Schoenberg's Op. 11 piano compositions.) Writing in 1971, Richard Williams felt that the album's disjointed and fragmentary approach had "all the epigrammatic, enigmatic power of Japanese haiku", containing 'passages written in the conditional tense (i.e. the songs move easily between reality and fantasy), a technique evolved by Godard in the cinema and which only Wilson, as far as I know, has picked up in pop."

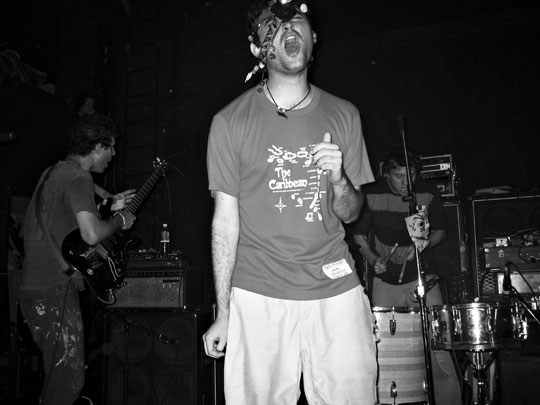
Smiley Smile anticipated lo-fi pop acts such as Animal Collective

Smiley Smile was one of 100 albums featured in the 2000 book The Ambient Century as a chapter in the development of ambient music. Pitchfork contributor Mark Richardson wrote that the record "basically invented the kind of lo-fi bedroom pop that would later propel Sebadoh, Animal Collective, and other characters." The New York Observer's Ron Hart wrote that Smiley Smile had effectively presaged the work of Harry Nilsson, Elvis Costello, Stereolab, the High Llamas, the Olivia Tremor Control, and Father John Misty. Dedicated tribute albums include Smiling Pets (1998) and Portland Sings The Beach Boys "Smiley Smile" (2013).

Other admirers of the album have included Pete Townshend of the Who and Robbie Robertson of the Band. XTC's Andy Partridge considered it one of "the most influential records for me" and it was a direct inspiration for his song "Season Cycle" (Skylarking, 1986). In an interview with Time, Steven Tyler of Aerosmith stated that his "island" music picks include Smiley Smile, "Just for the melodic fuck all." Keiichi Suzuki and Hirokazu Tanaka, composers for the Japanese role-playing video game series Mother, cited Smiley Smile among influences on the games' soundtracks. Comedian Trevor Moore stated that the theme song for his troupe's television show, The Whitest Kids U' Know, was based on "Little Pad", which itself had been used as the opening theme for their live shows.

== Track listing ==
Side one
No.	Title	Writer(s)	Lead vocal(s)	Length
1.	"Heroes and Villains"	Brian Wilson, Van Dyke Parks	Brian Wilson	3:37
2.	"Vegetables"	Wilson, Parks	group	2:07
3.	"Fall Breaks and Back to Winter (W. Woodpecker Symphony)"	Wilson	instrumental	2:15
4.	"She's Goin' Bald"	Wilson, Mike Love, Parks	Mike Love	2:15
5.	"Little Pad"	Wilson	Carl Wilson and B. Wilson	2:30

Side two
No.	Title	Writer(s)	Lead vocal(s)	Length
1.	"Good Vibrations"	Wilson, Love	C. Wilson with Love	3:37
2.	"With Me Tonight"	Wilson	C. Wilson	2:17
3.	"Wind Chimes"	Wilson	group	2:36
4.	"Gettin' Hungry"	Wilson, Love	B. Wilson and Love	2:27
5.	"Wonderful"	Wilson, Parks	C. Wilson	2:21
6.	"Whistle In"	Wilson	C. Wilson with Love	1:04
Total length:				27:36

Smiley Smile / Wild Honey 1990/2001 CD reissue bonus tracks
No.	Title	Writer(s)	Lead vocal(s)	Length
23.	"Heroes and Villains" (alternate take)	Wilson, Parks	B. Wilson	3:00
24.	"Good Vibrations" (various sessions)	Wilson	instrumental	6:57
25.	"Good Vibrations" (early take)	Wilson	C. Wilson with B. Wilson	3:03
26.	"You're Welcome"	Wilson	group	1:11
27.	"Their Hearts Were Full of Spring"	Bobby Troup	group	2:33
28.	"Can't Wait Too Long"	Wilson	B. Wilson with C. Wilson	5:34

Lead vocals per 1990 CD liner notes by David Leaf. On its original release, Van Dyke Parks was not credited for "Wonderful".

== Personnel ==
Per David Leaf, as well as from band sessionographer Craig Slowinski, including full credits for "Good Vibrations" and "Heroes and Villains" and partial credits for "Vegetables." The credits for "Good Vibrations" are adapted from Slowinski's liner notes from The Smile Sessions box set, as well as the website Bellagio 10452, maintained by music historian Andrew G. Doe.

The Beach Boys

- Al Jardine – lead vocals, harmony and backing vocals, water bottle sound effects
- Mike Love – lead vocals, harmony and backing vocals
- Brian Wilson – lead vocals, harmony and backing vocals, tack piano, Baldwin organ, harpsichord, electric harpsichord, tambourine, electric bass
- Carl Wilson – lead vocals, harmony and backing vocals, guitar, shaker
- Dennis Wilson – harmony and backing vocals, Hammond organ
- Bruce Johnston – backing vocals on "Good Vibrations"

Additional musicians and production staff

- Billy Hinsche – harmony and backing vocals on "Heroes and Villains"
- Van Dyke Parks – tack piano
- Hal Blaine – drums, timpani, shaker
- Jimmy Bond – double bass
- Frank Capp – bongos with sticks
- Al Casey – electric rhythm guitar
- Jerry Cole – electric rhythm guitar
- Gary Coleman – sleigh bells
- Steve Douglas – tenor flute
- Jesse Ehrlich – cello
- Gene Estes – slide whistle
- Jim Gordon – drums
- Bill Green – contra-clarinet, bass saxophone
- Jim Horn – piccolo
- George Hyde – French horn
- Larry Knechtel – Hammond organ
- Plas Johnson – piccolo, flutes
- Al De Lory – tack piano
- Mike Melvoin – upright piano
- Jay Migliori – flutes
- Tommy Morgan – bass harmonica, overdubbed jaw harp, harmonica
- Bill Pitman – Danelectro six-string bass
- Ray Pohlman – Fender bass
- Don Randi – electric harpsichord
- Lyle Ritz – double bass, Fender bass
- Billy Strange – 12-string electric rhythm guitar
- Paul Tanner – Electro-Theremin on "Good Vibrations"
- Terry (surname unknown, possibly Terry Melcher) – tambourine
- Arthur Wright – Fender bass
- unknown (possibly Hal Blaine) – tambourine

Technical staff

- Chuck Britz – engineer
- Cal Harris – engineer
- Jim Lockert – engineer
- The Beach Boys – producers
- Brian Wilson – producer ("Good Vibrations")

== Charts ==
Chart (1967)	Peak; position
UK Record Retailer LPs Chart	9
US Billboard 200	41

Chart (2025)	Peak; position
Greek Albums (IFPI) 2001 reissue	27

== Bibliography ==
- Badman, Keith (2004). The Beach Boys: The Definitive Diary of America's Greatest Band, on Stage and in the Studio. Backbeat Books. ISBN 978-0-87930-818-6.
- Bogdanov, Vladimir; Woodstra, Chris; Erlewine, Stephen Thomas, eds. (2002). All Music Guide to Rock: The Definitive Guide to Rock, Pop, and Soul. Backbeat Books. ISBN 978-0-87930-653-3.
- Brackett, Nathan; with Hoard, Christian, eds. (2004). The New Rolling Stone Album Guide (4th ed.). Fireside/Simon & Schuster. ISBN 0-7432-0169-8.
- Carlin, Peter Ames (2006). Catch a Wave: The Rise, Fall, and Redemption of the Beach Boys' Brian Wilson. Rodale. ISBN 978-1-59486-320-2.
- DeRogatis, Jim (2003). Turn on Your Mind: Four Decades of Great Psychedelic Rock. Hal Leonard Corporation. ISBN 978-0-634-05548-5.
- Dillon, Mark (2012). Fifty Sides of the Beach Boys: The Songs That Tell Their Story. ECW Press. ISBN 978-1-77090-198-8.
- Harrison, Daniel (1997). "After Sundown: The Beach Boys' Experimental Music" (PDF). In Covach, John; Boone, Graeme M. (eds.). Understanding Rock: Essays in Musical Analysis. Oxford University Press. pp. 33–57. ISBN 978-0-19-988012-6.
- Heylin, Clinton (2007). The Act You've Known for All These Years: The Life, and Afterlife, of Sgt. Pepper (1st ed.). Canongate. ISBN 978-1-84195-918-4.
- Gaines, Steven (1986). Heroes and Villains: The True Story of The Beach Boys. Da Capo Press. ISBN 0-306-80647-9.
- Granata, Charles L. (2003). Wouldn't it Be Nice: Brian Wilson and the Making of the Beach Boys' Pet Sounds. Chicago Review Press. ISBN 978-1-55652-507-0.
- Highwater, Jamake (1968). Rock and Other Four Letter Words: Music of the Electric Generation. Bantam Books. ISBN 0-552-04334-6.
- Kent, Nick (2009). "The Last Beach Movie Revisited: The Life of Brian Wilson". The Dark Stuff: Selected Writings on Rock Music. Da Capo Press. ISBN 978-0-7867-3074-2.
- Lambert, Philip (2007). Inside the Music of Brian Wilson: the Songs, Sounds, and Influences of the Beach Boys' Founding Genius. Continuum. ISBN 978-0-8264-1876-0.
- Lambert, Philip, ed. (2016). Good Vibrations: Brian Wilson and the Beach Boys in Critical Perspective. University of Michigan Press. ISBN 978-0-472-11995-0.
- Leaf, David (1978). The Beach Boys and the California Myth. Grosset & Dunlap. ISBN 978-0-448-14626-3.
- Love, Mike (2016). Good Vibrations: My Life as a Beach Boy. Penguin Publishing Group. ISBN 978-0-698-40886-9.
- Matijas-Mecca, Christian (2017). The Words and Music of Brian Wilson. ABC-CLIO. ISBN 978-1-4408-3899-6.
- Moskowitz, David V., ed. (2015). The 100 Greatest Bands of All Time: A Guide to the Legends Who Rocked the World. ABC-CLIO. ISBN 978-1-4408-0340-6.
- Prendergast, Mark J. (2000). The Ambient Century: From Mahler to Trance, the Evolution of Sound in the Electronic Age. Bloomsbury. ISBN 978-0-7475-4213-1.
- Preiss, Byron (1979). The Beach Boys. Ballantine Books. ISBN 978-0-345-27398-7.
- Priore, Domenic (1995). Look, Listen, Vibrate, Smile!. Last Gap. ISBN 0-86719-417-0.
- Priore, Domenic (2005). Smile: The Story of Brian Wilson's Lost Masterpiece. Sanctuary. ISBN 1-86074-627-6.
- Sanchez, Luis (2014). The Beach Boys' Smile. Bloomsbury Publishing. ISBN 978-1-62356-956-3.
- Schinder, Scott (2007). "The Beach Boys". In Schinder, Scott; Schwartz, Andy (eds.). Icons of Rock: An Encyclopedia of the Legends Who Changed Music Forever. Greenwood Press. ISBN 978-0-313-33845-8.
- Stebbins, Jon (2011). The Beach Boys FAQ: All That's Left to Know About America's Band. Backbeat Books. ISBN 978-1-4584-2914-8.
- Whiteley, Sheila; Sklower, Jedediah (2014). Countercultures and Popular Music. Ashgate Publishing. ISBN 978-1-4724-2106-7.
