= Wind Chimes (song) =

1967 song by the Beach Boys

Song by the Beach Boys

from the album Smiley Smile
- Released: September 18, 1967
- Recorded: July 10–11, 1967
- Studio: Beach Boys Studio, Los Angeles
- Length: 2:36
- Label: Brother; Capitol
- Songwriter: Brian Wilson
- Producer: The Beach Boys

Licensed audio
- "Wind Chimes" on YouTube

Audio sample
- file; help

"Wind Chimes"

Song by the Beach Boys

from the album Good Vibrations: Thirty Years of the Beach Boys
- Released: July 29, 1993
- Recorded: August 3 – October 10, 1966
- Studio: Gold Star and Western, Hollywood
- Length: 2:33
- Label: Capitol
- Songwriters: Brian Wilson; Van Dyke Parks
- Producer: Brian Wilson

Licensed audio
- "Wind Chimes" on YouTube

Audio sample
- file; help

"Wind Chimes" is a song by the American rock band the Beach Boys from their 1967 album Smiley Smile and their unfinished Smile project. Written by Brian Wilson and Van Dyke Parks, it was inspired by wind chimes hanging outside Wilson's home and was one of the first pieces tracked for the Smile sessions.

The original version of "Wind Chimes" was recorded from August to October 1966 and featured a coda that consisted of multiple overdubbed pianos played in counterpoint from each other. In July 1967, the band rerecorded the song with a significantly different arrangement for inclusion on Smiley Smile. The original Smile recordings were later released on the compilations Good Vibrations: Thirty Years of the Beach Boys (1993) and The Smile Sessions (2011).

== Background ==
"Wind Chimes" was written by Brian Wilson and Van Dyke Parks, although Parks was not officially credited as a co-writer when the song was first published. Brian's wife Marilyn said: "We went shopping one day and we brought home some wind chimes. We hung them outside the house and then one day, while Brian was sitting around he sort of watched them out the window and then he wrote the song. I think that’s how it happened. Simple. He does a lot of things that way."

For years, fans had been speculating that "Wind Chimes" was to fulfill the "Air" section of "The Elements" suite that Brian had envisioned for Smile, due to its breezy instrumentation and lyrics referencing the eponymous ornamental—an instrument provoked by wind. However, a preliminary track list from December 1966 indicated "The Elements" and "Wind Chimes" as separate tracks; and that the "Air" section could have alluded more to breathing, as implied through practice sessions performed by Brian and his friends.

== Smile sessions ==
"Wind Chimes", in its original form, was first tracked on August 3, 1966 at Gold Star Studios. The occasion marked the unofficial start of the Smile sessions. Another version of the track was recorded on October 3, which was later followed by further overdubs on October 5 and 10 at Western Studio. Van Dyke Parks said,

When we got to "Wind Chimes", on the mallet tremolos, I remember at that point Brian asked me to play mallets, but the fellow who really played them was Gary Coleman, the great percussionist, who came down to do a lot of percussion for the album. We discovered that, by recording at half speed, you would come down an octave. So you could play anything at half speed an octave lower, raise the speed to normal speed, and you'd sound like you could play like a son of a bitch, like an expert. It gave you velocity that you didn't really have.

In a March 1967 article for Teen Set, band associate Michael Vosse wrote of a half-hour recording session involving the overdubbing of contrapuntal "music box" piano parts,

"OK, let's hear it." Wilson in the control room, standing close to the center speaker, listens to the playback. He rushes to the board and supervises the throwing of switches and turning of knobs – more echo on the third track, a touch of reverb on the second honky-tonk overdub, this track dry and the other with more highs. Something happens to the sounds; they change, they move around and are transformed into a work of sheer beauty. Everyone in the booth has seen and heard the entire process.

"How did he do it?" they ask one another. Wilson stands at the back of the booth chuckling, he grabs a fire exinguisher off the wall and aims the nozzle at his friend David Anderle. "All right David, this is IT, you've HAD IT!" WOOOOOOOSSSSSHHHHHHHHHH! A blast of air cools David's face. Both men collapse giggling.

Vosse referred to "Wind Chimes" explicitly in a 1969 article for Fusion, again recalling the "music box" tag section, and said, "at that time it [the song] was considered a tentatively finished product." He also wrote,

Brian did something I've never heard anybody do: by recording everybody and doing the song straight through, and going back to the tape and eliminating voices, he had this little section where voices sounded like little percussion instruments — because he took everything out and would only let one little thing come in at a time, so suddenly there was this break and it was funny, but it worked so well that it built up the rhythm and made the change in such a way that all I can say is he found a new way to make musical changes in a song. And I must've heard the thing a hundred times: Anderle and I used to beg him to play that old dub for us.

== Smiley Smile sessions ==
The Smiley Smile version of "Wind Chimes" was recorded on July 10 and 11, 1967 at Wilson's makeshift home studio. This version differed significantly from its Smile counterpart. In the description of Record Collector's Jamie Atkins, "'Wind Chimes', previously breezy and bucolic, became tense and claustrophobic; the usually angelic harmonies of the Beach Boys sound discordant, even malevolent, until the end of the track when a beautiful a cappella flourish gives way to a barely audible Dennis, Brian and Carl harmony tag." The tag contains a melody that was previously used in Wilson's "Holidays".

== Critical reception ==
Writing in The Wire, Mike Barnes remarked of the Smile version of the song, "'Wind Chimes', with its exquisite tuned percussion, seems certain to have been influenced by Steve Reich's Drumming, but then you realise it was recorded five years before Reich's minimalist masterpiece was even composed."

== Legacy ==
In July 1967, the bass line from the Smile version of "Wind Chimes" was reworked into another song, "Can't Wait Too Long".

On December 23, 1967, "Wind Chimes" was issued as the B-side of the band's "Wild Honey" single.

In 1994, "Wind Chimes" was sampled by German electronica duo Mouse on Mars in their song "Die Seele von Brian Wilson".

== Personnel ==
Per band archivist Craig Slowinski, these credits pertain to the Smile Sessions version.

The Beach Boys

- Brian Wilson – overdubbed grand and tack pianos
- Carl Wilson – lead vocal, Fender bass, 12-string electric guitar, finger snaps, wood blocks

Guest

- Van Dyke Parks – marimbas

Session musicians

- Chuck Berghofer – upright bass (verses)
- Hal Blaine – drums, sticks
- Frank Capp – temple blocks
- Sam Glenn Jr. – tenor saxophone
- Bill Green – clarinet
- Jim Horn – clarinet
- Carol Kaye – Danelectro bass
- Larry Knechtel – grand piano
- Al De Lory – electric harpsichord
- Jay Migliori – tenor saxophone
- Don Randi – tack piano, celeste
- Lyle Ritz – upright bass (chorus and tag)

== Cover versions ==
- 1990 – The Mooseheart Faith, Smiles, Vibes & Harmony: A Tribute to Brian Wilson
- 1998 – David Grubbs, Smiling Pets
- 2000 – Katrina Mitchell & Bill Wells, Caroline Now!

== Bibliography ==
- Badman, Keith (2004). The Beach Boys: The Definitive Diary of America's Greatest Band, on Stage and in the Studio. Backbeat Books. ISBN 978-0-87930-818-6.
- Priore, Domenic (2005). Smile: The Story of Brian Wilson's Lost Masterpiece. Bobcat Books. ISBN 978-1860746277.
