= Fall Breaks and Back to Winter (W. Woodpecker Symphony) =

Instrumental composition by Brian Wilson

Instrumental by the Beach Boys

from the album Smiley Smile
- Released: September 18, 1967
- Recorded: June 29, 1967
- Studio: Brian Wilson's home studio, Los Angeles
- Genre: Avant-garde
- Length: 2:15
- Label: Brother/Capitol
- Composer: Brian Wilson
- Producer: The Beach Boys

Audio sample
- "Fall Breaks and Back to Winter (W. Woodpecker Symphony)": file; help

"Fall Breaks and Back to Winter (W. Woodpecker Symphony)" is an instrumental composed by Brian Wilson for the American rock band the Beach Boys. Released in 1967 as the third track on the group's album Smiley Smile, the composition derives from "Fire" – a piece recorded by Wilson several months earlier, but left unreleased due to his paranoia. It was briefly considered for inclusion on Brian Wilson Presents SMiLE in 2004.

== Composition ==
"Fall Breaks and Back to Winter (W. Woodpecker Symphony)" is an avant-garde composition with ambient elements, built on an uncertain discordant progression that repeats with a refrain melodically imitating the laugh of the cartoon character Woody Woodpecker, bookended by percussive chimes. Wilson said of the piece that it was "sort of a song about a cold winter scene. We tried to paint a picture of winter and then spring, late summer, and then broke into winter. We used the Woody Woodpecker theme because it was descriptive to us of spring and summer."

Biographer David Leaf noted its "bizarre woodpecking" percussion, the sentimental use of an accordion to imitate Woody Woodpecker's laugh, and droning wordless vocals by all of the Beach Boys which were originally an element of the shelved composition "The Elements: Fire". Musicologist Daniel Harrison described the piece (along with other Smiley Smile tracks) as "a kind of protominimal rock music", and that "the lack of formal or harmonic development makes the listener focus upon other quaities such as instrumentation, timbre, and reverberation. A concentrated listening effort thus goes quickly to subtle details."

== Legacy ==
Writer Richard Goldstein characterized "Fall Breaks and Back to Winter" as a precursor to the sound of experimental pop band Animal Collective. In 1996, the instrumental was included in David Toop's Ocean of Sound, a 2-CD compilation album meant to accommodate his book of the same name.

=== Cover versions ===
- 1970: Gary Usher, Add Some Music to Your Day: A Symphonic Tribute to Brian Wilson
- 1993: David Garland, I Guess I Just Wasn't Made for These Times (David Garland Performs Brian Wilson)
- 1998: Jim O'Rourke, Smiling Pets
