= Little Pad =

Beach Boys song written by Brian Wilson

Song by the Beach Boys

from the album Smiley Smile
- Released: September 18, 1967
- Recorded: June 19–28, 1967
- Studio: Beach Boys (Los Angeles)
- Genre: Lo-fi
- Length: 2:30
- Label: Capitol
- Songwriter: Brian Wilson
- Producer: The Beach Boys

Audio sample
- file; help

"Little Pad" is a song by the American rock band the Beach Boys from their 1967 album Smiley Smile. It was written by Brian Wilson and its working title had been "Hawaiian Song". On the track, the group sings in unison about wanting a "little pad in Hawaii" while accompanied by a Hawaiian guitar, an organ, and clip-clop percussion.

== Music ==
A psychedelic pop collage with elements of Hawaiian music, the song's only lyrics deal with the possibility of having a little house by the sea in Hawaii. Unlike many other tracks on Smiley Smile, "Little Pad" did not originate during the sessions for Smile, the album that was aborted by the band and replaced by Smiley Smile. Beginning life as the brief piece "Hawaiian Song", it and "Little Pad" were tracked on June 19–21 and 28, 1967. Both songs were later combined into one.

Author Andrew Hickey said that "the song's a nothing, but it's a gentle, heartfelt, beautiful vocal performance." Writer Domenic Priore said that the song is "one of the group's finest moments."

== Personnel ==
Sourced from Keith Badman.

- Mike Love
- Brian Wilson
- Carl Wilson
- Dennis Wilson

== Cover versions ==
- 1988 – Louis Philippe
- 1998 – The Olivia Tremor Control, Smiling Pets

== In popular culture ==
- In 1996, Japanese Shibuya-kei musician Keigo Oyamada (stage name Cornelius) recorded a spiritual sequel to the song titled "World's End Humming ~Reprise (In Hawaii)", a closer to his album 69/96.
- Comedian Trevor Moore stated that the theme song for his troupe's television show, The Whitest Kids U' Know, was based on "Little Pad", which itself had been used as the opening theme for their live shows.
