= Mrs. O'Leary's Cow =

Mrs. O'Leary's Cow may refer to:

- The cow belonging to Mrs. Catherine O'Leary, often blamed in folklore for starting the Great Chicago Fire of 1871
- "Mrs. O'Leary's Cow", an instrumental song by Brian Wilson
