= The Smile Sessions =

Compilation album and box set by the Beach Boys
- Released: October 31, 2011
- Recorded: October 15, 1965 – 1971
- Studios: Western; Columbia; Gold Star; Sunset Sound; Sound Recorders; Beach Boys (Hollywood)
- Length: 48:03 (album reconstruction); 140:57 (2-CD); 396:28 (box set)
- Label: Capitol
- Producer: Brian Wilson (original recordings)
- Compilers: Alan Boyd; Mark Linett; Brian Wilson; Dennis Wolfe

The Beach Boys chronology
Summer Love Songs (2009)	The Smile Sessions (2011)	That's Why God Made the Radio (2012)

Singles from The Smile Sessions
- 1. "Cabin Essence" / "Wonderful" Released: June 15, 2011

The Smile Sessions is a compilation album and box set recorded by the American rock band the Beach Boys, released on October 31, 2011, by Capitol Records. The set is the follow-up to The Pet Sounds Sessions (1997), this time focusing on the abandoned recordings from the band's unfinished 1966–1967 album Smile. It features comprehensive session highlights and outtakes, with the first 19 tracks comprising a hypothetical version of the completed Smile album.

The compilation is the first and only package devoted to the 1960s Smile recordings originally produced by Brian Wilson, arriving after decades of public anticipation and numerous false starts. The project was produced by Alan Boyd, Mark Linett, and Capitol A&R director Dennis Wolfe, with Wilson acting as a remote supervisor, assisting with some mixing decisions. Linett also was the engineer on the project. Previously, Wilson had completed a solo album based on Smile in 2004, that was recorded and mixed by Linett and which Boyd, Linett, and Wolfe used as a blueprint for The Smile Sessions. Wilson later stated that, while the compilation is "not a far cry" from his original vision, he prefers his 2004 version.

The Smile Sessions received virtually unanimous critical acclaim upon release. It was ranked number 381 in Rolling Stone's 2012 list of the greatest albums of all time and won the Grammy Award for Best Historical Album at the 2013 Grammy Awards. A spiritual successor, 1967 – Sunshine Tomorrow, followed in 2017.

== Background ==
Plans for a Smile archival release go back to at least early 1980s, when it was proposed that the album be issued in some form. In his 1978 biography The Beach Boys and the California Myth, David Leaf wrote that Smile "can never be completed as Brian intended, so a compromise solution might be to release the surviving tapes and outtakes in a series of records called The Smile Sessions [like] Elvis' Sun Sessions ..." In 1993, the box set Good Vibrations: Thirty Years of The Beach Boys included the debut of several unreleased Smile recordings. In 1997, Capitol Records issued The Pet Sounds Sessions, which featured an assortment of alternate mixes and highlights of the Pet Sounds recording sessions spread over four CDs. The releases provoked speculation that an official Smile release was imminent.

In 2004, Wilson released a reimagined version of the album, Brian Wilson Presents Smile. A comprehensive and official package dedicated to the original Beach Boys' recordings had not been compiled partly due to the logistics in organizing the dozens of convoluted song components. Band producer/archivist Mark Linett stated, "All we had were a bunch of bits and pieces—a few songs that were more or less completed later. And without some kind of a sequence from the artist, it would have just sort of been a jumble of sessions. And I think frankly until Brian felt comfortable with after all that time, he was able to finish what he started, there really wasn’t anything to seriously talk about."

In mid-2010, before the project was officially greenlit, Linett and the other compilers began assembling what would become The Smile Sessions. It was originally planned as a three-CD set, but ultimately grew to five CDs, with two of those devoted solely to the sessions for "Heroes and Villains" and "Good Vibrations", respectively.

== Smile reconstruction ==
This isn’t a project where an album was completed and just shelved for one reason or another and we’re bringing it back after all this time. It was largely unfinished and unsequenced. And it certainly wouldn't have been what it became in 2004.

— Compiler Mark Linett

The first nineteen tracks of The Smile Sessions constitute a hypothetical version of a completed Smile album that loosely follows the template established by Wilson's 2004 version. Wilson himself made a few suggestions to the compilation's sequencing after it was presented to him by the compilers Mark Linett, Alan Boyd and Dennis Wolfe. Linett said that the track listing would "present the whole piece as close to it as was envisioned, or as is envisioned, as possible ... with input from Brian as from everybody else".

According to Darian Sahanaja, "there was a discussion about whether to follow the 2004 sequence or completely present something new. In the end, of course, it all has to be approved by the Beach Boys themselves, and Brian lobbied hard for The Smile Sessions to follow the template of Brian Wilson Presents Smile." Asked if there had been anything newly unearthed from the sessions that would have influenced the 2004 assembly, Sahanaja responded, "No. Nothing major. Perhaps a few variations here and there, but nothing that would have altered the making of Brian Wilson Presents Smile." Asked if Linett and Boyd had arrived at what he had envisioned during the 1960s, Wilson responded: "Somewhat, yeah. To some degree. It's not a far cry from what I thought it would be." He later stated that he preferred his 2004 version.

=== Technical details ===
The reconstruction is presented in monaural due to missing stems and as a nod to Wilson's producing methods at the time. Digital manipulation was used. For instance, on "Surf's Up", the instrumental track was mashed up and synced with the vocal stem from an alternate performance of the song.

Not all of the tracks feature material that was originally recorded for the Smile album. In reference to including sessions from Smiley Smile, Linett stated, "Of course there's things that some people think—should Smiley Smile sessions be there—[with tracks such as] 'Can't Wait Too Long', we get into a very fuzzy area." A list of notes on the reconstructed album assembly were given in the booklet:

- Brian Wilson's lead vocals for "I'm in Great Shape" and "Barnyard" are taken from his and Van Dyke Parks' piano demo of "Heroes and Villains" (which includes the other two songs), recorded on November 4, 1966, for KHJ Radio and featured in full as track 36 on Disc Two in the five-CD box set edition. The vocals were stripped from the demo and laid on the existing backing tracks, comprising instrumentation, backing vocals and animal noises by the band.
- "The Elements: Fire" contains wordless vocals that were recorded for "Fall Breaks and Back to Winter" on June 29, 1967.
- "Holidays" and "Wind Chimes" segue together with a pitch-shifted version of the Smiley Smile "Wind Chimes" coda, recorded July 11, 1967.
- The "Cool Cool Water Chant" intro to "Love to Say Dada" and Carl Wilson's "da-da" vocals were recorded in October 1967.
- Carl Wilson's lead vocal on "Cabin Essence" was recorded for the 20/20 album on November 20, 1968.
- The "bygones", part of the first movement's lead vocals, Carl Wilson's backing vocals and the "Child Is Father of the Man" coda of "Surf's Up" was recorded in summer 1971.

== Release ==
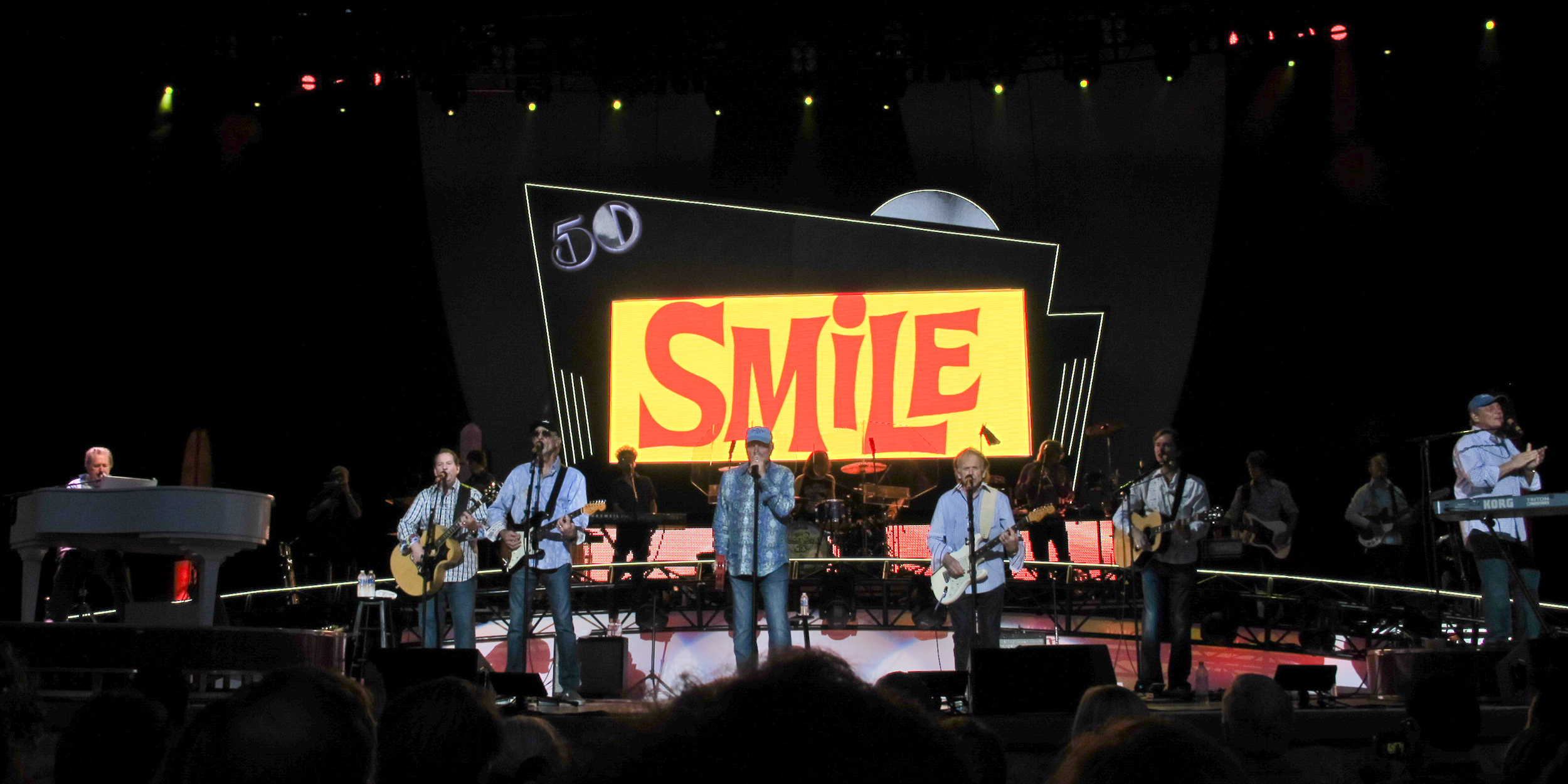
The reunited Beach Boys in 2012, performing "Heroes and Villains" during their 50th anniversary tour

On February 3, 2011, Al Jardine told an interviewer that "Capitol Records plans to issue a Beach Boys version of Smile sometime this summer to begin the celebration of the Beach Boys’ 50th anniversary. Smile is the Holy Grail for Beach Boys’ fans, so it will be good." Jardine also mentioned that the surviving Beach Boys "didn't do any new recording. I'm happy to see it finally come out. Brian’s changed his mind about releasing the material, but it was inevitable, wasn’t it?" The release was confirmed by Capitol Records on March 11, with the acknowledgement that an official release was planned for later in 2011.

After numerous delays, The Smile Sessions was released online via iTunes on October 31, 2011, and the next day on CD, vinyl and through other online services via digital download. The compilation was released in an array of physical format releases, including a single CD release, a double LP release, a deluxe 2-CD package, as well as a limited edition deluxe box set composed of 5 CDs, 2 LPs, 2 singles on 7" vinyl records, a poster and a 60-page booklet that features high quality photographs, essays and liner notes on the reconstruction process. The CD is encoded with HDCD and can be decoded with Windows Media Player. HDCD is backwards compatible.

The crowdsourcing film studio Tongal was used to create the music videos for The Smile Sessions, where fans in 2011 could submit video concepts, which were voted on and ultimately selected by other fans for two videos.

== Reception ==
Professional ratings
Aggregate scores
Source	Rating
Metacritic	96/100
Review scores
Source	Rating
AllMusic	4.5/5 stars
The A.V. Club	A
Consequence of Sound	A+
The Guardian	5/5 stars
One Thirty BPM	100%
Paste	9/10 stars
Pitchfork	10/10
Rolling Stone	4.5/5 stars
Ultimate Classic Rock	5/5 stars
Record Collector	5/5 stars

The Smile Sessions was met with universal acclaim. It was named the best reissue of 2011 by Rolling Stone magazine, while The Wire magazine placed it fifth in its annual critics' poll of the top releases of the year. In 2012, it was ranked number 381 in Rolling Stone's list of the greatest albums of all time. It won the Best Historical Album award at the 2013 Grammy Awards.

Pitchfork reviewer Mark Richardson gave the album a perfect score and wrote, "What's here is brilliant, beautiful, and, most importantly, finally able to stand tall on its own." The Los Angeles Times' Randall Roberts encouraged its inclusion in "every library of American recording history," suggesting, "university composition departments, music professors, budding recording engineers and composers should study it." Rolling Stone's David Fricke declared in his review, "there is delight and confidence in Wilson's exchanges with his studio crew. ... Wilson never found it, but the greatest pop album ever made is still in here, somewhere."

Writing in LA Weekly, musician Henry Rollins praised the compiled recordings as "even better than advertised ... Sonically, the album is one of the best things you are likely to hear in all of your life. There are moments on SMiLE that are so astonishingly good you might find yourself just staring at your speakers in unguarded wonder, as I have." PopMatters' Thomas Britt wrote "There is something holy in the tapestry of the album" and when reflecting on the drama surrounding the album's history stated "Contemporary bands could certainly stand to realize that all the band myths and stories in the world don’t matter much if you can't bring the songs, and no one brought the songs like Brian Wilson."

== Track listing ==
=== Smile (tracks 1–19 all editions) ===
All tracks are written by Brian Wilson and Van Dyke Parks, except where noted.

Movement one
No.	Title	Lead vocals	Length
1.	"Our Prayer" (Brian Wilson)	group	1:05
2.	"Gee" (William Davis, Morris Levy)	group	0:51
3.	"Heroes and Villains"	B. Wilson (verse), Al Jardine (chorus), Mike Love ("Cantina"), group	4:52
4.	"Do You Like Worms (Roll Plymouth Rock)"	group	3:35
5.	"I'm in Great Shape"	B. Wilson	0:28
6.	"Barnyard"	B. Wilson	0:48
7.	"My Only Sunshine (The Old Master Painter / You Are My Sunshine)" (Gillespie/Davis, Mitchell)	Dennis Wilson	1:55
8.	"Cabin Essence"	Carl Wilson (verses), group (chorus), D. Wilson (2nd chorus), Love (tag)	3:30
Total length:			16:59

Movement two
No.	Title	Lead vocals	Length
9.	"Wonderful"	B. Wilson	2:04
10.	"Look (Song for Children)" (B. Wilson)	group	2:31
11.	"Child Is Father of the Man"	group	2:10
12.	"Surf's Up"	B. Wilson (sections one and two), C. Wilson, Jardine (tag)	4:12
Total length:			10:54

Movement three
No.	Title	Lead vocals	Length
13.	"I Wanna Be Around / Workshop" (Johnny Mercer/B. Wilson)	Instrumental	1:23
14.	"Vega-Tables"	Jardine, B. Wilson (tag)	3:49
15.	"Holidays" (B. Wilson)	Instrumental	2:32
16.	"Wind Chimes" (B. Wilson)	C. Wilson	3:06
17.	"The Elements: Fire (Mrs. O'Leary's Cow)" (B. Wilson)	group	2:35
18.	"Love to Say Dada" (B. Wilson)	B. Wilson	2:32
19.	"Good Vibrations" (B. Wilson, Mike Love)	C. Wilson (verses), Love (chorus and bridge), group	4:15
Total length:			20:10 48:03

=== Bonus tracks ===
==== Two-CD deluxe edition ====
Disc one
No.	Title	Lead vocals	Length
20.	"You're Welcome" (B. Wilson)	group	1:08
21.	"Heroes and Villains (Stereo Mix)"	B. Wilson, Love	4:53
22.	"Heroes and Villains Sections (Stereo Mix)"	The Beach Boys	7:16
23.	"Vega-Tables (Demo)"	Love, B. Wilson	1:46
24.	"He Gives Speeches"	B. Wilson	1:14
25.	"Smile Backing Vocals Montage"	The Beach Boys	8:30
26.	"Surf's Up 1967 (Solo Version)"	B. Wilson	3:47
27.	"Psycodelic Sounds: Brian Falls into a Piano" (B. Wilson)	spoken	1:30
28.	"Capitol Smile Promo" (Capitol Records/hidden track)	spoken	1:02
Total length:			31:04 79:07

Disc two
No.	Title	Session date	Length
1.	"Our Prayer 'Dialog'" (B. Wilson)	(09/19/66)	3:02
2.	"Heroes and Villains: Part One"		3:08
3.	"Heroes and Villains: Part Two"		4:18
4.	"Heroes and Villains: Children Were Raised"	(01/27/67)	2:07
5.	"Heroes and Villains: Prelude to Fade"	(02/15/67)	3:42
6.	"My Only Sunshine"	(11/14/66)	6:52
7.	"Cabin Essence"	(10/03/66)	5:19
8.	"Surf's Up: 1st Movement"	(11/04/66)	4:55
9.	"Surf's Up: Piano Demo"	(12/15/66)	3:53
10.	"Vega-Tables: Fade"	(4/12/67)	5:25
11.	"The Elements: Fire session"	(11/28/66)	8:27
12.	"Cool, Cool Water (Version 2)"	(10/26/67) – (10/29/67)	3:32
13.	"Good Vibrations Session Highlights"		8:20
14.	"Psycodelic Sounds: Brian Falls into a Microphone" (hidden track)	(11/04/66)	1:10
Total length:			64:02 2:23:09

==== Vinyl edition ====
Vinyl-exclusive tracks (disc two, side two)
No.	Title	Lead vocals	Length
20.	"You're Welcome (Stereo mix)" (B. Wilson)	The Beach Boys	1:08
21.	"Vega-Tables (Stereo Mix)"	Jardine	3:49
22.	"Wind Chimes (Stereo Mix)"	C. Wilson	3:06
23.	"Cabin Essence (Sessions highlights and stereo backing track)"	C. Wilson	5:19
24.	"Surf's Up (Session excerpt and stereo mix)"	B. Wilson	4:46

==== Box set edition ====
All tracks are written by Brian Wilson and Van Dyke Parks, except where noted.

Disc one
No.	Title	Lead vocals	Length
20.	"You're Welcome" (Brian Wilson)	The Beach Boys	1:08
21.	"Heroes and Villains (Stereo Mix)"	B. Wilson, Love	4:53
22.	"Heroes and Villains Sections (Stereo Mix)"	The Beach Boys	7:16
23.	"Vega-Tables demo"	Love, B. Wilson	1:46
24.	"He Gives Speeches"	B. Wilson	1:14
25.	"Smile Backing Vocals Montage"	The Beach Boys	8:30
26.	"Surf's Up 1967 (Solo Version)"	B. Wilson	4:09
27.	"Psycodelic Sounds: Brian Falls into a Piano" (B. Wilson)	spoken	1:30
28.	"Capitol Smile Promo" (Capitol Records)	spoken	1:02

All tracks are written by Brian Wilson, except where noted.

Disc two
No.	Title	Session date	Length
1.	"Our Prayer 'Dialog'"	(09/19/66)	3:01
2.	"Our Prayer"	(10/04/66)	6:37
3.	"Heroes and Villains: Verse (Master Take)"	(10/20/66)	0:57
4.	"Heroes and Villains: Barnyard (Master Take)"	(10/20/66)	1:12
5.	"Heroes and Villains: I'm in Great Shape"	(10/27/66)	4:59
6.	"Heroes and Villains: Intro (Early Version)"	(12/??/66)	0:35
7.	"Heroes and Villains: Do a Lot"	(01/03/67)	0:53
8.	"Heroes and Villains: Bag of Tricks"	(01/03/67)	2:58
9.	"Heroes and Villains: Mission Pak"	(01/03/67)	0:55
10.	"Heroes and Villains: Bridge to Indians"	(01/03/67)	1:47
11.	"Heroes and Villains: Part 1 Tag"	(01/03/67)	1:19
12.	"Heroes and Villains: Pickup to 3rd Verse"	(01/03/67)	0:55
13.	"Heroes and Villains: Children Were Raised"	(01/27/67)	2:07
14.	"Heroes and Villains: Part 2 (Cantina Track)"	(01/27/67)	1:21
15.	"Heroes and Villains: Whistling Bridge"	(01/27/67)	1:14
16.	"Heroes and Villains: Cantina"	(01/27/67)	1:36
17.	"Heroes and Villains: All Day"	(01/27/67)	2:19
18.	"Heroes and Villains: Verse Edit Experiment"	(01/27/67)	0:48
19.	"Heroes and Villains: Prelude to Fade"	(02/15/67)	3:43
20.	"Heroes and Villains: Piano Theme"	(02/15/67)	2:43
21.	"Heroes and Villains: Part 2"	(02/20/67)	2:31
22.	"Heroes and Villains: Part 2 (Gee) (Master Take)"	(02/20/67)	2:36
23.	"Heroes and Villains: Part 2 Revised"	(02/20/67)	1:54
24.	"Heroes and Villains: Part 2 Revised (Master Take)"	(02/20/67)	0:48
25.	"Heroes and Villains: Part 3 (Animals) (Master Take)"	(02/20/67)	1:18
26.	"Heroes and Villains: Part 4"	(02/20/67)	2:36
27.	"Heroes and Villains: Part Two (Master Take)"	(02/27/67)	1:44
28.	"Heroes and Villains: Fade"	(02/28/67)	6:35
29.	"Heroes and Villains: Verse Remake"	(03/01/67)	4:16
30.	"Heroes and Villains: Organ Waltz/Intro"	(03/01/67)	2:04
31.	"Heroes and Villains: Chorus Vocals"	(06/14/67)	0:48
32.	"Heroes and Villains: Barbershop"	(06/14/67)	1:50
33.	"Heroes and Villains: Children Were Raised (Remake)"	(06/14/67)	1:06
34.	"Heroes and Villains: Children Were Raised (Master Take Overdubs Mix 1)"	(06/14/67)	0:26
35.	"Heroes and Villains: Children Were Raised (Master Take A Capella)"	(06/14/67)	0:27
36.	"Heroes and Villains Piano Demo (incorporating 'I'm in Great Shape' and 'Barnyard') Brian with Van Dyke Parks and 'Humble Harve' Miller, KHJ Radio"	(11/04/66)	4:17
37.	"Psycodelic Sounds: Brian Falls into a Microphone"	(11/04/66)	1:10
38.	"Psycodelic Sounds: Moaning Laughing"	(11/04/66)	1:09

Disc three
No.	Title	Session date	Length
1.	"Do You Like Worms: Part 1"	(10/18/66)	5:21
2.	"Do You Like Worms: Part 2 (Bicycle Rider)"	(10/18/66)	1:55
3.	"Do You Like Worms: Part 3"	(10/18/66)	2:43
4.	"Do You Like Worms: Part 4 (Bicycle Rider)"	(10/18/66)	1:10
5.	"Do You Like Worms: Bicycle Rider Overdubs (Heroes and Villains Part 2)"	(01/05/67)	0:22
6.	"My Only Sunshine: Parts 1 & 2"	(11/14/66)	6:51
7.	"My Only Sunshine: Part 2 (Master Take With Vocal Overdubs)"	(02/10/67)	0:45
8.	"Cabin Essence: Verse"	(10/03/66)	2:14
9.	"Cabin Essence: Chorus"	(10/03/66)	2:28
10.	"Cabin Essence: Tag"	(10/03/66)	2:31
11.	"Wonderful (Version 1)"	(08/25/66)	2:59
12.	"Wonderful (Version 2 "Rock With Me, Henry")"	(01/09/67)	3:25
13.	"Wonderful (Version 2 Tag)"	(01/09/67)	2:54
14.	"Wonderful (Version 3)"	(04/10/67)	2:41
15.	"Look"	(08/12/66)	4:52
16.	"Child is Father of the Man (Version 1)"	(10/07/66)	4:57
17.	"Child is Father of the Man (Version 2)"	(10/11/66)	5:38
18.	"Surf's Up: 1st Movement"	(11/04/66)	4:54
19.	"Surf's Up: Talking Horns"	(11/07/66)	3:42
20.	"Surf's Up: Piano Demo (Master Take)"	(12/15/66)	3:52
21.	"I Wanna Be Around/ Workshop (Friday Night)"	(11/29/66)	3:08
22.	"Vegetables: Verse (Master Take Track)"	(04/04/67) – (04/11/67)	2:02
23.	"Vegetables: Sleep a Lot (Chorus)"	(04/04/67) – (04/11/67)	2:34
24.	"Vegetables: Chorus 1 (Master Take)"	(04/04/67) – (04/11/67)	1:05
25.	"Vegetables: 2nd Chorus (Master Take Track and Backing Vocals)"	(04/04/67) – (04/11/67)	1:03
26.	"Vegetables: Insert (Part 4) (Master Take)"	(04/04/67) – (04/11/67)	0:37
27.	"Vegetables: Crunching Session (hidden track)"	(04/04/67) – (04/11/67)	1:02
28.	"Workshop Session (hidden track)"	(11/29/66)	1:40

Disc four
No.	Title	Session date	Length
1.	"Vegetables: Fade"	(04/12/67)	5:25
2.	"Vegetables: Ballad Insert"	(04/14/67)	1:03
3.	"Holidays"	(09/08/66)	7:32
4.	"Wind Chimes (Version 1)"	(08/03/66)	6:46
5.	"Wind Chimes (Version 2)"	(10/05/66)	5:00
6.	"Wind Chimes (Version 2 Tag)"	(10/05/66)	2:51
7.	"The Elements (Fire)"	(11/28/66)	8:27
8.	"Da Da (Taped Piano Strings)"	(12/22/66)	1:00
9.	"Da Da (Fender Rhodes)"	(12/22/66)	1:21
10.	"Love to Say Dada: Part 1"	(05/16/67)	1:22
11.	"Love to Say Dada: Part 2"	(05/17/67)	1:57
12.	"Love to Say Dada: Part 2 (Master Take)"	(05/17/67)	1:21
13.	"Love to Say Dada: Part 2 (Second Day)"	(05/18/67)	2:00
14.	"Cool, Cool Water (Version 1)"	(06/07/67)	2:21
15.	"Cool, Cool Water (Version 2)"	(10/26/67) & (10/29/67)	3:31
16.	"You're Welcome (Session)"	(12/15/66)	6:41
17.	"You're With Me Tonight"	(06/06/67) – (06/07/67)	2:46
18.	"Tune X" (Carl Wilson)	(03/03/67) – (03/31/67)	2:18
19.	"I Don't Know" (Dennis Wilson)	(01/12/67)	3:03
20.	"Three Blind Mice"	(10/15/65)	2:11
21.	"Teeter Totter Love" (Jasper Dailey)	(01/25/67) & (02/09/67)	1:49
22.	"Psycodelic Sounds – Underwater Chant"	(11/04/66)	1:45
23.	"Hal Blaine Vega-Tables Promo Session"	(11/16/66)	1:28
24.	"Heroes and Villains: Early Version Outtake Sections"	(01/??/67) – (02/??/67)	5:04
25.	"The Elements: Fire (Mrs. O'Leary's Cow) (Burning Wood Session) (hidden track)"		0:45

Disc five
No.	Title	Session date	Length
1.	"Good Vibrations: Gold Star (The Pet Sounds Session)"	02/18/66	7:27
2.	"Good Vibrations: Gold Star"	04/09/66	6:57
3.	"Good Vibrations: Western (First Chorus)"	05/04/66	2:24
4.	"Good Vibrations: Western (Second Chorus & Fade)"	05/04/66	3:28
5.	"Good Vibrations: Sunset Sound (Part 1)"	05/24/66	1:20
6.	"Good Vibrations: Sunset Sound (Parts 2 & 3)"	05/24/66	1:45
7.	"Good Vibrations: Sunset Sound (Part 4)"	05/24/66	0:47
8.	"Good Vibrations: Western (Part C)"	05/27/66	3:32
9.	"Good Vibrations: Western (Chorus)"	05/27/66	3:04
10.	"Good Vibrations: Western (Fade Sequence)"	05/27/66	1:56
11.	"Good Vibrations (Inspiration): Western (Part 1)"	06/02/66	2:44
12.	"Good Vibrations (Inspiration): Western (Part 3)"	06/02/66	0:57
13.	"Good Vibrations (Inspiration): Western (Part 4)"	06/02/66	0:49
14.	"Good Vibrations: Western (Part 1)"	06/16/66	6:24
15.	"Good Vibrations: Western (Part 2 & Verse)"	06/16/66	1:06
16.	"Good Vibrations: Western (Part 2 Continued)"	06/16/66	5:55
17.	"Good Vibrations: Western (Part 1)"	06/18/66	1:10
18.	"Good Vibrations: Western (Part 2)"	06/18/66	5:03
19.	"Good Vibrations (Persuasion): Western"	09/01/66	1:49
20.	"Good Vibrations: Western (New Bridge)"	09/01/66	3:39
21.	"Good Vibrations: Session Masters"		6:13
22.	"Good Vibrations: Single Version Stereo Track"		3:49
23.	"Good Good Good Vibrations (First Version With Overdubs)"	03/??/66	3:41
24.	"Good Vibrations: Alternate Edit"	08/24/66	3:32
25.	"Good Vibrations: Tape Rewind (hidden track)"		0:27

Bonus 7" records

All tracks written by Brian Wilson and Van Dyke Parks.

Single one, side one
No.	Title	Length
1.	"Heroes and Villains: Part One"	3:09

Single one, side two
No.	Title	Length
1.	"Heroes and Villains: Part Two"	4:08

Single two, side one
No.	Title	Length
1.	"Vega-Tables"	3:49

Single two, side two
No.	Title	Length
1.	"Surf's Up"	4:12

== Personnel ==
Adapted from band archivist Craig Slowinski.

=== Recording ===
These credits pertain only to the first 19 tracks.

The Beach Boys

- Al Jardine – lead, harmony and backing vocals, vegetable chomping (on "Vega-Tables")
- Bruce Johnston – harmony and backing vocals
- Mike Love – lead, harmony and backing vocals, vegetable chomping (on "Vega-Tables")
- Brian Wilson – lead, harmony and backing vocals; grand piano (on "Child Is Father of the Man", "Surf's Up", "Vega-Tables", and "Wind Chimes"), harpsichord (on "Do You Like Worms?" and "Wonderful"), tack piano (on "Heroes and Villains", "Child Is Father of the Man", "Wind Chimes", and "Good Vibrations"), Baldwin organ (on "Heroes and Villains"), electric harpsichord (on "Heroes and Villains" and "Vega-Tables"), Fender bass (on "I'm in Great Shape"), temple blocks (on "Love to Say Dada"), tambourine (on "Good Vibrations"), vegetable chomping (on "Vega-Tables")
- Carl Wilson – lead, harmony and backing vocals; electric guitar (on "Child Is Father of the Man", "Wind Chimes" and "Good Vibrations"), Fender bass (on "Vega-Tables", "Holidays" and "Wind Chimes"), acoustic guitar (on "Cabin Essence"), castanet (on "Child Is Father of the Man"), shaker (on "Good Vibrations"), vegetable chomping (on "Vega-Tables")
- Dennis Wilson – lead, harmony and backing vocals, drums (on "Vega-Tables" and "Holidays"), percussion (on "Vega-Tables"), Hammond organ (on "Good Vibrations"), xylophone (on "Vega-Tables"), vegetable chomping (on "Vega-Tables")

Guests

- Gene Gaddy – "You're under arrest!"
- Van Dyke Parks – piano with taped strings (on "I'm In Great Shape", "Do You Like Worms?", and "Holidays"), upright piano (on "Cabin Essence"), tack piano (on "Heroes and Villains", "Barnyard", and "Do You Like Worms?"), marimba (on "Wind Chimes")

Session musicians

- Charles C. Berghofer – upright bass
- Hal Blaine – drums, percussion
- Jimmy Bond Jr. – upright bass
- James Burton – dobro
- Frank Capp – percussion, bongos, drums, glockenspiel, hi hat, stick, tambourine, temple blocks, vibraphone
- Jerry Cole – guitar
- Al De Lory – piano, tack piano
- Joseph DiFiore – viola
- Jesse Ehrlich – cello
- Gene Estes – percussion, Hammond organ, marimba, percussion, piano, recorder, shaker, triangle, vibraphone, whistle
- Carl Fortina – accordion
- Sam Glenn – saxophone
- Jim Gordon – drums, conga drums, tambourine
- Bill Green– clarinet, flute, alto flute, piccolo, bass saxophone, tenor saxophone, whistle
- Jim Horn – clarinet, flute, kazoo, piccolo, slide whistle, percussion
- Armand Kaproff – cello
- Alfred Lustgarten – violin
- Arthur Maebe – French horn
- Carol Kaye – bass guitar, banjo
- Larry Knechtel – grand piano, organ
- Jay Migliori – saxophone
- Oliver Mitchell – trumpet
- Tommy Morgan – harmonica, bass harmonica, jew's-harp
- Bill Pitman – guitar
- Ray Pohlman – bass guitar
- Don Randi – piano, harpsichord
- Dorothy Remsen – harp
- Lyle Ritz – upright bass
- Billy Strange – guitar
- Paul Tanner – Electro-Theremin
- Don Randi – celeste, electric harpsichord, grand piano, tack piano
- Tommy Tedesco – guitar, bouzouki
- Alan Weight – trumpet

=== Production ===
- Alan Boyd – compilation producer, editing, liner notes, producer
- Chuck Britz – engineer
- Stacey Freeman – product manager
- Frank Holmes – design, drawing
- Mark Linett – compilation producer, editing, liner notes, mastering, mixing, producer
- Mark London – hard-cover book design
- Domenic Priore – project consultant
- Tom Recchion – art direction, design
- Peter Reum – photography
- Diane Rovell – contractor
- Mikel Samson – production design
- Guy Webster – photography
- Brian Wilson – arranger, compilation producer, composer, liner notes, main personnel, photography, producer
- Dennis Wolfe – compilation producer, liner notes

== Charts ==
Chart	Peak position
Belgian Albums Chart (Flanders)	84
Dutch Albums Chart	20
Finnish Albums Chart	46
French SNEP Albums Chart	84
German Media Control Albums Chart	26
Greek Albums (IFPI)	39
Japanese Oricon Albums Chart	14
Norwegian VG-lista Albums Chart	13
Spanish Albums Chart	90
Swedish Albums Chart	9
Swiss Albums Chart	65
UK Albums Chart	25
US Billboard 200	27
US Billboard Vinyl Albums	1

== Accolades ==
Year	Organization	Accolade	Result
2011	Rolling Stone	10 Best Reissues of 2011	1
2012	The Wire	Top 50 Releases of 2011	5
2012	Rolling Stone	The 500 Greatest Albums of All Time	381
2013	National Academy of Recording Arts and Sciences	Grammy Award for Best Historical Album	Won
