= You're Welcome (song) =

Single by the Beach Boys
- A-side: "Heroes and Villains"
- Released: July 24, 1967
- Recorded: December 15, 1966, CBS Columbia Square, Hollywood
- Length: 1:17
- Label: Brother/Capitol
- Songwriter: Brian Wilson
- Producer: The Beach Boys

The Beach Boys singles chronology
"Then I Kissed Her" (1967)	"You're Welcome" (1967)	"Gettin' Hungry" (1967)

"You're Welcome" is a song written by Brian Wilson for American rock band the Beach Boys. It was released on July 24, 1967 as the B-side of the "Heroes and Villains" single. It later appeared as a bonus track on the compilations Smiley Smile/Wild Honey (1990) and The Smile Sessions (2011).

== Composition ==
The song is a mostly-a cappella chant, with the repeating phrase of "Well / you're well / you're welcome to come". In mid 1967, Mike Love said of the piece "[It's] incredible. The title is 'You’re Welcome'. No other lyrics. I don’t know how Brian did it, but there’s no accompaniment. [sic] 'Heroes and Villains' is going to be released as the first single on our new label, Brother Records…We are finishing it [the album] now." Its "extraordinary long fade-in" gives the impression of development which is absent from the similar "Whistle In", writes Daniel Harrison.

== Recording ==
"You're Welcome" was recorded on December 15, 1966 at CBS Columbia Square. Other songs worked on during that date were "Cabinessence", "Wonderful", and "Surf's Up". Some portions of the session were filmed by David Oppenheim.

== In popular culture ==
New York-based power pop combo the Cheepskates recorded a response to "You're Welcome" entitled "Thank You" for their 1988 album It Wings Above.

== Personnel ==
Per band archivist Craig Slowinski.

The Beach Boys

- Al Jardine – vocals
- Bruce Johnston – vocals
- Mike Love – vocals
- Brian Wilson – vocals, foot tap, glockenspiel (uncertain credit)
- Carl Wilson – vocals, drum (uncertain credit)
- Dennis Wilson – vocals, "parade drum" (uncertain credit)

== Cover versions ==
- 1997 – Melt-Banana, Smiling Pets
