= She's Goin' Bald =

1967 song by the Beach Boys

Song by the Beach Boys

from the album Smiley Smile
- Released: September 18, 1967
- Recorded: June 3 – July 14, 1967
- Studio: Beach Boys Studio, Los Angeles
- Genre: Experimental pop; psychedelic pop
- Length: 2:15
- Label: Brother; Capitol
- Songwriter(s): Brian Wilson; Mike Love; Van Dyke Parks
- Producer(s): The Beach Boys

Audio sample
- file; help

"He Gives Speeches"

Song by the Beach Boys

from the album The Smile Sessions
- Released: October 31, 2011
- Recorded: August 25 or September 1, 1966
- Length: 1:13
- Songwriter(s): Brian Wilson; Van Dyke Parks

"She's Goin' Bald" is a song by American rock band the Beach Boys from their 1967 album Smiley Smile. It was written by Brian Wilson, Mike Love, and Van Dyke Parks. Like many of the songs on that album, it has roots in the abandoned Smile album, as the short song "He Gives Speeches". Both compositions follow the "How Dry I Am" progression.

== Background ==
"He Gives Speeches" was recorded for the abandoned Smile. After the collapse of Smile, "He Gives Speeches" was left unreleased.

The song was later rewritten and rerecorded for Smiley Smile as "She's Goin' Bald" with new lyrics by Mike Love. In 1995, Brian Wilson said that it was only a coincidence that Love himself "was on his way to goin' bald then," and that the group did the song without being aware that he might have thought it was about him. Brian then called it "one of the funnier songs [the Beach Boys had] ever done, very current for its time."

On Love's contribution to the song, Bruce Johnston commented, "You want to know where Mike Love's at? He's Chuck Berry and Leiber and Stoller so if you listen to the end of She's Goin' Bald, there’s so much Leiber and Stoller in it. (Sings) 'You're too late mama, ain't nothing upside your head' and we go (sings) 'No hair, no hair…'."

In 1976, Dennis Wilson claimed: "I took that song in a very strange way, I thought it was more or less about oral sex. You know, [sings] 'Get a job, sha na na na, sha na na na na. What a blow...' And I thought, Jesus, that's funny as shit — [moronic voice] 'Hey, it's about getting a blow job, huh huh huh.' Love said of the song, "We were stoned out of our heads. We were laughing our asses off when we recorded that stuff."

The Smiley Smile version includes some unusual effects, including the novel use of the Eltro Information Rate Changer to raise the pitch of the group's vocals without affecting the tempo. The same device was also used to lower the voice of the HAL 9000 computer in the film 2001: A Space Odyssey.

When it came time to assemble the Smile material for Brian Wilson Presents Smile in 2004, Wilson passed on the inclusion of "He Gives Speeches" or "She's Goin' Bald". In 2011, the Beach Boys' recording of "He Gives Speeches" was issued as a bonus track for The Smile Sessions.

== Personnel ==
Per band archivist Craig Slowinski.

"He Gives Speeches"

- Brian Wilson – lead and backing vocals, upright piano (organ on early takes)
- Carl Wilson – Fender bass
- Dennis Wilson – drums
