= Whistle In =

1967 song by the Beach Boys

Song by the Beach Boys

from the album Smiley Smile
- Released: September 18, 1967
- Recorded: July 13, 1967
- Studio: Beach Boys (Los Angeles)
- Genre: Experimental pop
- Length: 1:04
- Label: Brother/Capitol
- Songwriter: Brian Wilson
- Producer: The Beach Boys

"Whistle In" is a song written by Brian Wilson for American rock band the Beach Boys. It is the eleventh and final track on their 1967 album Smiley Smile.

Like "You're Welcome" (the B-side to "Heroes and Villains"), "Whistle In" is a short chant sung by the Beach Boys. It features a driving honky-tonk piano and an electric bass line doubled by Mike Love's bass-baritone voice singing the line "dum, dum, dum, whistle in". Other backing and harmony vocals are shared by the Beach Boys, which Carl Wilson leads with the lines "remember the day, remember the night, all day long" similar to the 1964 Shangri-Las single "Remember (Walking in the Sand)".

It was erroneously speculated to have been sourced from a "Heroes and Villains" section entitled "Whistling Bridge". There is no discernible link between "Whistling Bridge" and "Whistle In" save for their titles. "Whistle In" was one of the last tracks recorded for Smiley Smile, the replacement for the aborted Smile album. Both "Whistle In" and "Wonderful" were both later covered by Nikki Sudden & the Mermaids for the 1990 tribute album Smiles, Vibes & Harmony: A Tribute to Brian Wilson.
