= The Elements: Fire =

"The Elements: Fire (Mrs. O'Leary's Cow)"

Instrumental by the Beach Boys

from the album The Smile Sessions
- Released: October 31, 2011
- Recorded: November 28, 1966 – June 29, 1967
- Studio: Gold Star and Beach Boys, Los Angeles
- Genre: Experimental rock; avant-garde
- Length: 2:27
- Label: Capitol
- Composer: Brian Wilson
- Producer: Brian Wilson

Music video
- "The Elements: Fire (Mrs. O Leary's Cow)" on YouTube

Audio sample
- file; help

"Fire" (also known as "The Elements – Part 1" and "Mrs. O'Leary's Cow") is an instrumental by American musician Brian Wilson that he originally composed for the Beach Boys' unfinished album Smile. Named after Catherine O'Leary and the Great Chicago Fire, the track was originally conceptualized as part of "The Elements", a four-part movement based on the four classical elements: Air, Fire, Earth, and Water. Wilson's friends, family, and colleagues later referred to its recording as heralding his period of psychosis and the unraveling of the Smile project.

Wilson produced "Fire" on November 28, 1966, at Gold Star Studios with 15 session musicians, including three bassists, four flutists, and a string sextet. The track was arranged to evoke images of a conflagration and was recorded under unusual conditions. To help set the mood, Wilson instructed everyone in the studio to wear a fire helmet and had a bucket of burning wood placed in the recording area so that it would smell of smoke.

Within a few days of the session, Wilson was frightened to learn that a nearby building had burned down shortly after the recording was made; he believed that the recording had somehow contributed to the fire and decided to shelve it afterwards.

In 1967, the band reworked the piece as "Fall Breaks and Back to Winter (W. Woodpecker Symphony)". In 2004, Wilson rerecorded "Fire" under the title "Mrs. O'Leary's Cow" for his album Brian Wilson Presents Smile. It earned him his first Grammy Award, winning in the category of Best Rock Instrumental Performance. In 2011, the original Beach Boys recording was released for The Smile Sessions.

== Background ==
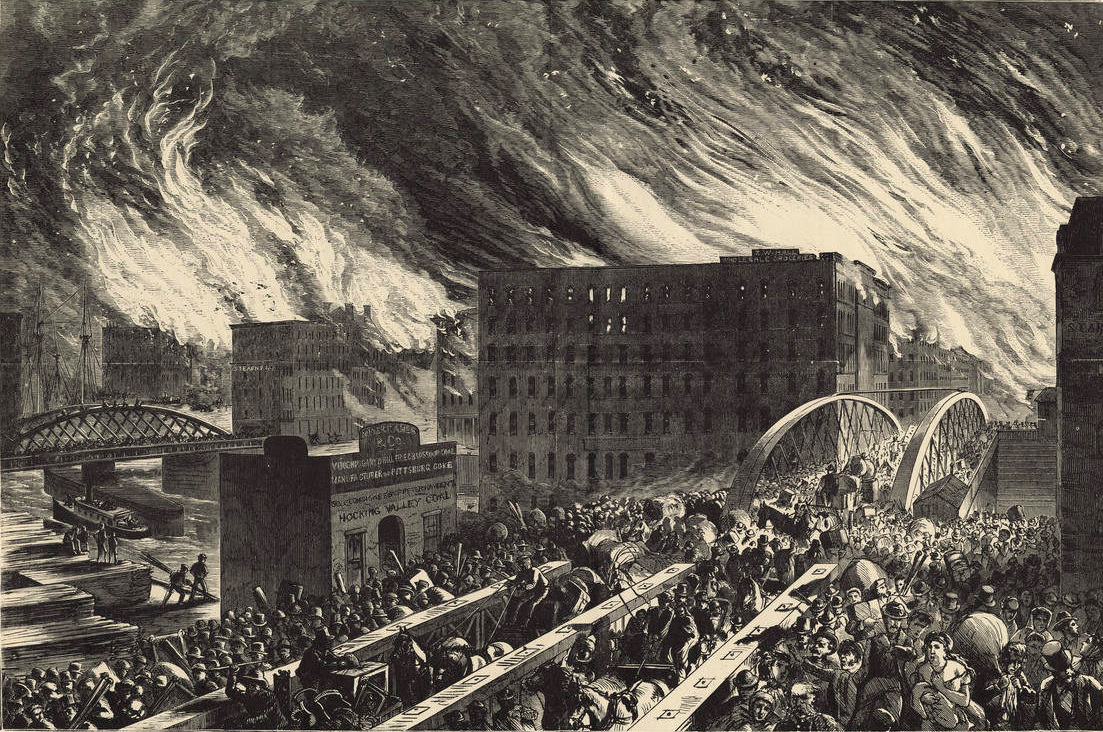
Artist's rendering of the Great Chicago Fire of 1871, an event on which "Fire" was based

"The Elements" was conceptualized as a four-part movement based on the four classical elements: Air, Fire, Earth, and Water. According to band associate David Anderle, Wilson "was really into the elements", so much so that he "ran up to Big Sur for a week, just 'cause he wanted to get into that, up to the mountains, into the snow, down to the beach, out to the pool, out at night, running around, to water fountains, to a lot of water, the sky, the whole thing was this fantastic amount of awareness of his surroundings. So the obvious thing was to do something that would cover the physical surroundings."

Anderle said that Wilson told friends "what fire was going to be, and what water was going to be; we had some idea of air. That was where it stopped. None of us had any ideas as to how it was going to tie together, except that it appeared to us to be an opera." Smile lyricist Van Dyke Parks recalled that an elemental concept did not come up until later in the project. "Fire" was to be the first part of the suite. Participants on the session tape refer to it as "The Elements – Part 1", while it was logged as "'The Elements' (Fire)" on the AFM contract. It was later given the alternate title "Mrs. O'Leary's Cow," for Catherine O'Leary, an Irish Catholic emigrant to the United States (and her allegedly frisky cow), famously scapegoated for the 1871 Great Chicago Fire.

In Wilson's (since-discredited) 1991 memoir, Wouldn't It Be Nice: My Own Story, the hallucinations of his second LSD trip were said to have involved death by burning. (Note: The 1991 memoir claims that Wilson's second LSD trip occurred in mid-1965, while Wilson's 2016 memoir, I Am Brian Wilson, claims that he did not take LSD for a second time until June 1966 at the earliest.) Music historian Bill Tobelman speculated that the track may have been conceived as a musical adaptation of this LSD trip. In the 2004 documentary Beautiful Dreamer: Brian Wilson and the Story of Smile, Wilson stated, "I was feeling unhappy so I thought that 'fire' tape would express the crazy, weird thoughts I was going through."

== Recording ==
"Fire" was recorded on November 28, 1966, at Gold Star Studios in Hollywood. Attendees of the session included singer Danny Hutton, illustrator Frank Holmes, Dennis Wilson (who filmed Brian as he worked), Marilyn Wilson, session contractor Diane Rovell, and Beach Boys roadie Arnie Geller. Wilson's friends, family, and colleagues later referred to the events surrounding "Fire" as heralding his psychosis and the unraveling of the Smile project. According to biographer Steven Gaines, Wilson had recently cancelled a session involving "an enormous string section" because he felt that the "vibrations" were not right. Consequently, Parks said, "I avoided the 'Fire' sessions like the plague. I didn't want to embarrass myself. I thought it was regressive behavior."

A gigantic fire howled out of the studio speakers in a pounding crush of pictorial music that summoned up visions of roaring, wind-storm flames, falling timbers, mournful sirens and sweating firemen, building into a peak and cackling off into fading embers as a single drum turned into a collapsing wall and the fire engines dissolved and disappeared.

— Saturday Evening Post reporter Jules Siegel recalling his impression of the "Fire" music, 1967

Discussing "Fire", Wilson told biographer Steven Gaines, "It was sick. Weird chords, it wasn't the straight eight and all that. I started thinking, 'Oh God, I'm flipping here.' But I liked it." His 1991 memoir stated that "the instrumental track was one long, eerie whine. ... It created a disturbing picture that mirrored the screams that had filled my head and plagued my sleep for years. ... The weirdest was the crash and crackle of instruments smoldering for the final time. Listening to the playback, I began to feel unnerved by the music, strange and eerie." Journalist Nick Kent described the track as a "dark, booming, reverb-drenched blur of sound." Biographer Byron Preiss, who was lent an acetate disc of the recording, called it "a mad, impressionistic piece that crept up on you with the emotional chill of a real fire." Author and musician Bob Stanley felt that "Fire" was a "terrifying atonal cacophony".

To help set the mood, the track was recorded under unusual conditions. Wilson instructed an acquaintance to purchase several dozen fire helmets at a local toy store so that everybody in the studio could don them during the recording. Wilson also had the studio's janitor, a man named Brother Julius, bring in a bucket with burning wood so that the room would smell of smoke. (Note: Writing in the liner notes of The Smile Sessions, Diane Rovell said that she was the one who was instructed by Wilson to bring the fire hats. Gaines said it was Arnie Geller.) The instrumental was recorded in 18 takes, after which he recorded the crackling noises made by the burning wood and mixed them into the track.

With the session completed, Jules Siegel quoted Wilson as saying, "Yeah, I'm going to call this 'Mrs. O'Leary's Fire' and I think it might just scare a whole lot of people." The next day, Wilson returned to Gold Star with many of the same musicians to produce a rendition of "I Wanna Be Around" and the original piece "Friday Night". (Note: Journalist Domenic Priore claimed that Wilson told collaborator Andy Paley that "I Wanna Be Around" and "Workshop" were recorded as a "rebuilding after the fire".)

== Aftermath ==
Within a few days of the "Fire" session, a building across the street from the studio burned down. Wilson was frightened that the recording may have caused the fire, as well as others around Los Angeles, and decided to keep the track unreleased. Siegel quoted Wilson, "I don't have to do a big scary fire like that. I can do a candle and it's still fire. That would have been a really bad vibration to let out on the world, that Chicago fire. The next one is going to be a candle." Anderle later told journalist Paul Williams, "after we all laughed at him, as we normally did in these situations, he went ahead and destroyed the tape. Completely. Eliminated it, never to be heard again. That basically destroyed 'Elements.' ... That was the first sign that we were going to have problems on this album."

We were doing witchcraft, trying to make witchcraft music. I was stoned on hashish and grass and I got a little too much into this one tape called "Fire". Then, a place burned down the same day we did the song. And I said to myself, "Somehow we must have burned the building down."

— Brian Wilson, 1992

The story of the "Fire" session was first reported in Siegel's 1967 memoir, "Goodbye Surfing, Hello God!", and subsequently became a much-mythologized part of the album's history. Another story involves Wilson attempting to set fire to the tapes only to find that they refuse to ignite, which further frightens him. (Note: In a 2013 interview, Al Jardine commented, "You can't burn tape, that's just a myth. We tried it once, because of the rumor that Brian has burned the tapes, and I wanted to see if that would work. We were finishing a song for Surf's Up and we had some outtakes from the album and I put a match to it, and it wouldn't burn. The tapes weren't burned, and needless to say they do exist for the Smile sessions.") Wilson falsely claimed in interviews to have destroyed the tapes and later said that the track was one of the principal reasons that Smile was never finished. He told Rolling Stone: "We thought maybe it was witchcraft or something. We didn't know what we were into. So we decided not to finish the project. ... I was getting too fancy and arty and doing things that were just not Beach Boys at all. They were made for me."

In 1967, the band reworked the piece as "Fall Breaks and Back to Winter (W. Woodpecker Symphony)", which featured the melody from "Fire" in the form of wordless vocals. Wilson said of this version, "That was sort of a song about a cold winter scene. We tried to paint a picture of winter and then spring, late summer, and then broke into winter." It was released in September as the third track on Smiley Smile.

On a 1978 Robert W. Morgan Special of the Week radio program, Dennis recalled how he had recently played the "Fire" tape for Brian, and that a day later, an electrical fire broke out at the Record Plant in Los Angeles, destroying the Studio C room. The 1985 documentary The Beach Boys: An American Band featured some previously unreleased music by the band, including an excerpt of "Fire".

== Release ==
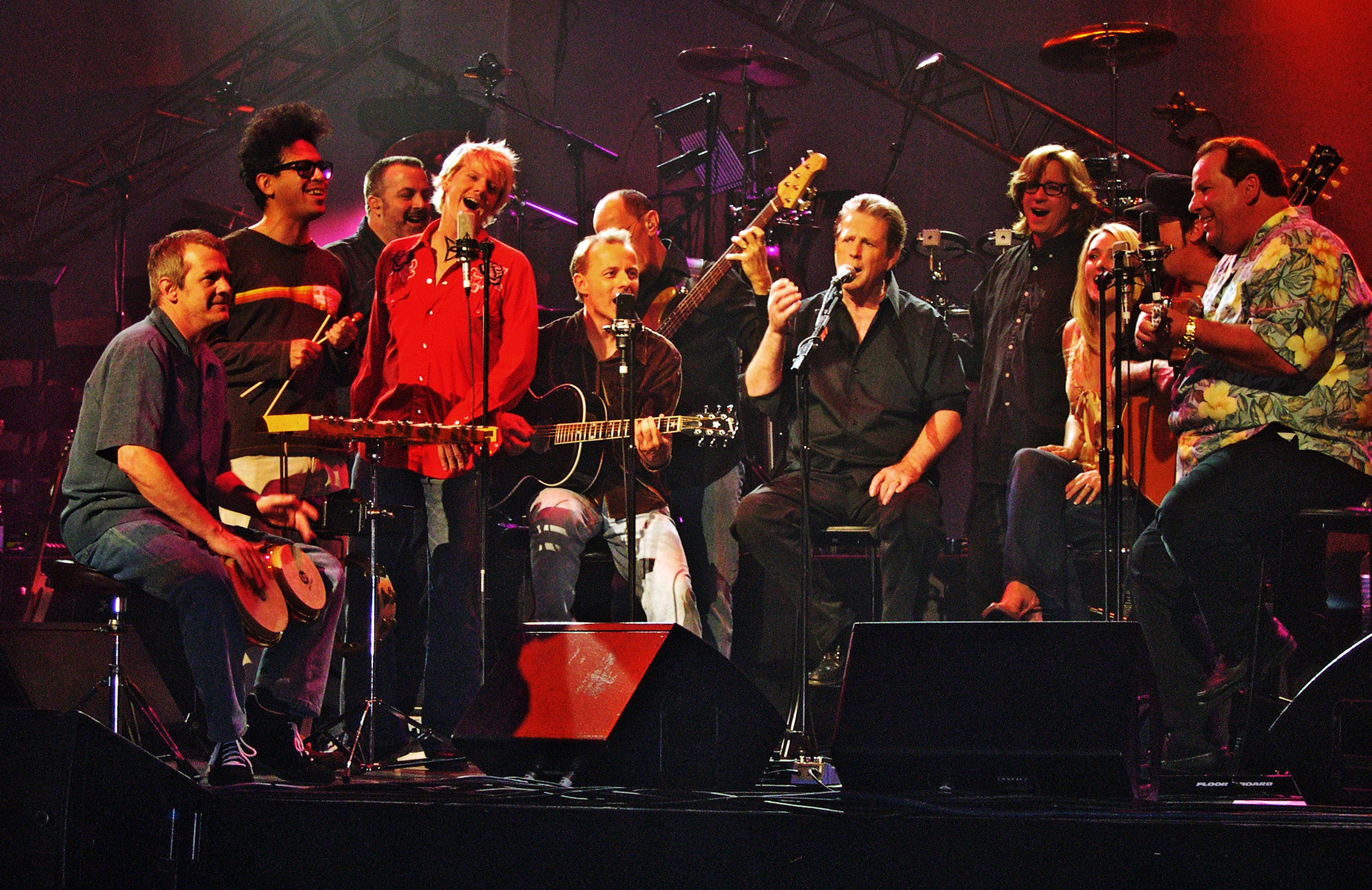
Wilson and his band performing at the Royal Festival Hall, February 2004

In 2004, Wilson rerecorded the piece as part of Brian Wilson Presents Smile with assistance from keyboardist Darian Sahanaja. As they were assembling the project, Sahanaja recalled, Wilson began humming the wordless melody from "Fall Breaks ...", after which it was decided to incorporate the same wordless vocals into the new arrangement of "Fire". Wilson left the string arrangement to Sahanaja. "I think that's the part that spooked him the most. I told him I'd deal with it." During the band rehearsals for "Mrs. O'Leary's Cow", the electricity in the building went out mid-performance. Biographer Mark Dillon wrote, "Luckily Brian wasn't around ... It might have convinced him the song was cursed after all."

"Mrs. O'Leary's Cow" earned Wilson his first Grammy Award, winning in the category of Best Rock Instrumental Performance. The original Beach Boys recording was later released on the 2011 compilation The Smile Sessions, where it was combined with the vocals from "Fall Breaks ...".

== Reception ==
One music historian wrote about this song, "The doors of hell are suddenly kicked open...[the] track is so thoroughly demonic that it could be the scariest thing ever put on tape."

== Personnel ==
Per band archivist Craig Slowinski.

The Beach Boys

- Brian Wilson – fire sound effects (uncertain credit)

Session musicians

- Arnold Belnick – violin
- Norman Botnick – viola
- Joseph DiTullio – cello
- Gene Estes – triangle, "clanking" percussion
- Jim Gordon – drums
- Bill Green– flute
- Jesse Ehrlich – cello
- Jim Horn – flute
- Plas Johnson – flute
- Carol Kaye – Fender bass
- Leonard Malarsky – violin
- Alexander Nelman – viola
- Jay Migliori – flute
- Bill Pitman – Danelectro fuzz bass
- Lyle Ritz – upright bass

== Bibliography ==
- Badman, Keith (2004). The Beach Boys: The Definitive Diary of America's Greatest Band, on Stage and in the Studio. Backbeat Books. ISBN 978-0-87930-818-6.
- Dillon, Mark (2012). Fifty Sides of the Beach Boys: The Songs That Tell Their Story. ECW Press. ISBN 978-1-77090-198-8.
- Gaines, Steven (1986). Heroes and Villains: The True Story of The Beach Boys. New York: Da Capo Press. ISBN 0306806479.
- Kent, Nick (2009). "The Last Beach Movie Revisited: The Life of Brian Wilson". The Dark Stuff: Selected Writings on Rock Music. Da Capo Press. ISBN 9780786730742.
- Lambert, Phillip (2007). Inside the Music of Brian Wilson: the Songs, Sounds, and Influences of the Beach Boys' Founding Genius. Continuum. ISBN 978-0-8264-1876-0.
- Preiss, Byron (1979). The Beach Boys. Ballantine Books. ISBN 978-0-345-27398-7.
- Priore, Domenic (2005). Smile: The Story of Brian Wilson's Lost Masterpiece. Sanctuary. ISBN 1860746276.
- Sanchez, Luis (2014). The Beach Boys' Smile. Bloomsbury Publishing. ISBN 978-1-62356-956-3.
- Siegel, Jules (1997) [1967]. "The Religious Conversion of Brian Wilson: Goodbye Surfing, Hello God". In Abbott, Kingsley (ed.). Back to the Beach: A Brian Wilson and the Beach Boys Reader. Helter Skelter. pp. 51–63. ISBN 978-1-90092-402-3.
- Stanley, Bob (2013). Yeah Yeah Yeah: The Story of Modern Pop. Faber & Faber. ISBN 978-0-571-28198-5.
- Williams, Paul; Anderle, David (1995). "A Celebration of Wild Honey". In Priore, Domenic (ed.). Look, Listen, Vibrate, Smile!. Last Gasp. pp. 220–241. ISBN 0-86719-417-0. Mirror (subscription required)
- Wilson, Brian; Gold, Todd (1991). Wouldn't It Be Nice: My Own Story. HarperCollins. ISBN 978-0-06-018313-4.
- Wilson, Brian; Greenman, Ben (2016). I Am Brian Wilson: A Memoir. Da Capo Press. ISBN 978-0-306-82307-7.
