= On a Holiday =

"Holidays"

Instrumental by the Beach Boys

from the album The Smile Sessions
- Released: October 31, 2011
- Recorded: September 8, 1966 – July 10, 1967
- Studio: Western and Beach Boys, Los Angeles
- Genre: Exotica
- Length: 2:32
- Label: Capitol
- Songwriter: Brian Wilson
- Producer: Brian Wilson

Licensed audio
- "Holidays" on YouTube

"Holidays" (sometimes erroneously called "Tones") is an instrumental by the American rock band the Beach Boys that was composed by Brian Wilson for their never-finished Smile album. In 2003, it was rewritten with new lyrics by Van Dyke Parks as "On a Holiday" for the project Brian Wilson Presents Smile (2004). A section of it was reused for "Happy Days" from Wilson's Imagination album in 1999.

== Recording ==
The original Beach Boys' version of "Holidays" was recorded on September 8, 1966 at Western Studio. According to historian Keith Badman, the session marked the official start of the album's sessions, although other tracks had been recorded before then. It is one of the few pieces from Smile where every section was performed as part of one whole take.

In 1967, the Beach Boys recycled the piece's marimba melody for the Smiley Smile version of "Wind Chimes". These vocals were later mashed up into the version of "Holidays" that appears on The Smile Sessions (2011).

Wilson's 2004 version of "Holidays" contains mostly the same arrangement, albeit with new vocals. The hook of another Smile track, "Roll Plymouth Rock", was repeated in the chorus.

== Lyrics ==
In a 2004 interview, Van Dyke Parks offered details about the lyrics he had recently penned for the song, now retitled "On a Holiday".

I thought it was only appropriate to continue the thought of Hawaii in this piece because back in the Sixties, we decided that this album would be about the westward movement from Plymouth Rock to Hawaii. It was only natural that I wanted to catch these pirates in a drunken celebration when they reached their territorial goal, which was Hawaii.

The pirates on the song … The pirating had been so determinate in my life – economically, of course – I decided to get at them. And keep the pirates in place. Include them. And that’s why that image is there. I thought it was a good thing for us to pursue the Hawaiians a little further with the pirate.

Here’s some very interesting information about that sad chapter in American history: the United States Marines – at the behest of Dole and some other missionaries – pointed the cannons directly at Queen Liliuokalani's palace. And she abdicated under military pressure. She was the same queen who had written hymns and studied in Paris. She actually wrote music. This tragic story about Hawaii – I thought – should be something to think about. That’s why that’s there.

["On a Holiday"] has a lot to do with all the things that are in the tale: the spread of the Gospel, the insistence that the conquered territories adapt to Christianity, and bow to the American way of life. When we were in our twenties, we were thinking about stuff like that. The musical world was basically influenced by The Beatles and their imitators, the war in Vietnam, and the struggle for civil rights. SMiLE is the entertainment that we thought we would serve up.

The line "lazy mister moon" alludes to the 1903 song "Lazy Moon", and "long, long ago" is a reference to the title of an 1833 text by Thomas Haynes Bayly that was recorded by Patti Page in 1951.

== Reception ==
In the opinion of Consequence of Sound's Dean Essner, the original "has no vocals at all, allowing for the track’s wind instruments and marimbas to gorgeously swell at the front of the mix. But on Brian Wilson Presents SMiLE, Wilson sings a forgettable line about pirates, cluttering up the otherwise simple, feathery melody." PopMatters' Sean Murphy characterized the song as a "Zappa-esque romp".

== Bootleg discrepancies ==
Bootlegs of Smile sometimes mislabel the track as "Tones". A 1983 LP bootleg, referred to as the "Brother Records" Smile, included a track titled "Holidays", but was actually Miles Davis' "Here Come de Honey Man" (1959).

== Personnel ==
Per band archivist Craig Slowinski.

The Beach Boys

- Al Jardine – tag vocals
- Mike Love – tag vocals
- Brian Wilson – tag vocals
- Carl Wilson – Fender bass, tag vocals
- Dennis Wilson – drums, tag vocals

Guest

- Van Dyke Parks – piano with taped strings, overdubbed slidewhistle (uncertain credit)

Session musicians (later known as "the Wrecking Crew")

- Gary Coleman – marimba
- Gene Estes – marimba
- Sam Glenn, Jr. – clarinet, overdubbed flute
- Bill Green – clarinet, overdubbed flute
- Jim Horn – clarinet, overdubbed flute
- Jay Migliori – clarinet, overdubbed flute
- Chet Ricard – marimba
