= Comedown (drugs) =

Feelings after a drug's effects are fading

The comedown, or crashing (also "down", "low", or sometimes "crash"), is a phase of drug withdrawal that involves the deterioration in mood and energy that occurs when a psychoactive drug, typically a stimulant, clears from the blood in the bloodstream. The improvement and deterioration of mood (euphoria and dysphoria) are represented in the cognitive schema as high and low elevations; thus, after the drug has elevated the mood (a state known as a high), there follows a period of coming back down, which often has a distinct character from withdrawal in stimulants. Generally, a comedown can happen to anyone as a transient symptom, but in people who are dependent on the drug (especially those addicted to it), it is an early symptom of withdrawal and thus can be followed by others.

Various drug classes, most especially stimulants and, to a lesser degree, opioids and sedatives, are subject to comedowns. A milder analogous mood cycle can happen even with blood sugar levels (thus sugar highs and sugar lows), which is especially relevant to people with diabetes mellitus and to parents and teachers managing children's behavior, as well as in adults with ADHD, although the notion of a "sugar high" has not been verified in scientific studies and appears to be a form of confirmation bias or placebo effect. The use of caffeine may also be subject to periods of low energy and mood following its effects. Stimulant comedowns are unique in that they often appear very abruptly after a period of focus or high, and are typically the more intensely dysphoric phase of withdrawal than that following complete elimination from the bloodstream. Besides general dysphoria, this phase can be marked by frustration, anger, anhedonia, social withdrawal, and other symptoms characteristic to a milder mixed episode in bipolar disorder. Alertness and other general stimulant effects are still present.

== MDMA ==
For example, in an MDMA ("ecstasy" and "molly") comedown, if the user experiences severe, persisting emotional distress, such as panic attacks, severe generalized anxiety, or insomnia following an MDMA session, a physician may prescribe a benzodiazepine (specifically, lorazepam), a sleep aid (e.g., zolpidem), or both to alleviate those effects.

== See also ==
- Hangover
- Dysphoria
- Self-medication
- Cocaine withdrawal
