= Love to Say Dada =

1993 song by The Beach Boys

"I Love to Say Da Da"

Song by the Beach Boys

from the album Good Vibrations: Thirty Years of the Beach Boys
- Released: July 29, 1993
- Recorded: May 16–18, 1967
- Studio: Gold Star, Hollywood
- Genre: Psychedelia
- Length: 1:34
- Label: Capitol
- Songwriter: Brian Wilson
- Producer: Brian Wilson

Music video
- "I Love to Say Da Da" on YouTube

"In Blue Hawaii"

Song by Brian Wilson

from the album Brian Wilson Presents Smile
- Released: September 24, 2004
- Recorded: 2004
- Studio: Sunset Sound, Hollywood
- Length: 3:00
- Label: Nonesuch
- Songwriters: Brian Wilson; Van Dyke Parks
- Producer: Brian Wilson

Music video
- "In Blue Hawaii" on YouTube

"Love to Say Dada" (also known as "I Love to Say Da Da", "Da Da", "All Day", and "In Blue Hawaii") is an unfinished song that was written by the American musician Brian Wilson for the Beach Boys' Smile project. It was one of the last tracks recorded for the album. The song subsequently evolved into "Cool, Cool Water" from Sunflower (1970).

In 2003, Wilson rewrote "Love to Say Dada" as "In Blue Hawaii" with new lyrics by Van Dyke Parks for Brian Wilson Presents Smile (2004). The Beach Boys' original recording of "Love to Say Dada" was released on the compilations Good Vibrations: Thirty Years of the Beach Boys (1993) and The Smile Sessions (2011). The latter release mixed elements from "Cool, Cool Water" into the track.

== Background ==
Wilson's first wife Marilyn wrote in the liner notes of The Smile Sessions: "When he was writing Love to Say Dada he had me buy him a baby bottle and fill it with chocolate milk, and he would sit and write and drink from it. It was hilarious, I thought." Stephen Desper, who became the band's engineer in late 1967, wrote in 2012 that "Love to Say Dada" was "a song about a baby ... It was never finished or released. [sic]"

Music historian Bill Tobelman noted that the song's title could be abbreviated as "LSD", a reference to the drug. Biographer Byron Preiss wrote that the song formed part of the water-themed section of "The Elements" and was "briefly considered" to be paired with "Surf's Up".

== Recording ==
On December 22, 1966, Wilson recorded two versions of the track, titled "Da Da", at Columbia Studio. One version featured him playing a piano with the strings taped, while the other featured him playing a Fender Rhodes electric piano. No master number was assigned to the tape. "Heroes and Villains: All Day" was recorded on January 27, 1967.

From May 16 to 18, 1967, Wilson produced three sessions dedicated to the track at Gold Star Studios. Another session scheduled for May 19 that would have likely seen further work on the track was cancelled. The session would have employed the musicians Mike Rubini, Bill Pitman, Lyle Ritz, drummers Hal Blaine and Jim Gordon, and percussionist Alan Estes. According to music historian Keith Badman, these occasions marked the final sessions for the Smile album.

== "Cool, Cool Water" ==
"Love to Say Dada" later evolved into the song "Cool, Cool Water". The "Cool Cool Water Chant", which appears as an introduction to The Smile Sessions version of "Love to Say Dada", was recorded in October 1967. Vocals recorded by Carl Wilson for "Cool, Cool Water" on October 29, 1967 were also combined with this version.

== Personnel ==
Per band archivist Craig Slowinski.

Part 1 (May 16, 1967)

- Hal Blaine – drums
- Gene Estes – upright piano
- Mike Rubini – grand piano
- Bill Pitman – Danelectro bass
- Lyle Ritz – upright bass
- Brian Wilson – temple blocks

Part 2 (May 17, 1967)

- Hal Blaine – drums
- Gene Estes – Hammond organ
- Jim Horn – clarinet
- Carol Kaye – electric rhythm guitar
- Jay Migliori – clarinet
- Bill Pitman – Danelectro bass (uncertain credit)
- Ray Pohlman – 12-string electric lead guitar (uncertain credit)
- Lyle Ritz – Fender bass (uncertain credit)
- Mike Rubini – grand piano
- Brian Wilson – vocals, temple blocks

Part 2 (Second Day) (May 18, 1967)

- Frank DeVito – bongos
- Gene Estes – Hammond organ
- Bill Green – piccolo, whistle
- Jay Migliori – piccolo, whistle
- Bill Pitman – "gut-string" guitar
- Ray Pohlman – Danelectro bass
- Mel Pollan – upright bass
- Mike Rubini – grand piano
- Brian Wilson – piano with taped strings
