= Eltro information rate changer =

Analog recording tool

The Eltro information rate changer is an analog recording tool for changing pitch without changing speed and vice versa. Patents for the device date from the 1920s. The Eltro was the first machine capable of changing audio pitch (frequency) and speed (time) independently of each other.

The Eltro was developed in Germany by an engineer, Anton Marian Springer (1909–1964). It was an accessory to a reel-to-reel tape recorder. Recorders compatible with the Eltro were introduced in the 1940s. The Eltro was first publicly demonstrated in 1953. By the mid 1960s, it was in many recording studios.

The Eltro was often used to adjust the timing of radio commercials to fit them exactly to their time limits. Using the Eltro, a recording engineer could control the length of a commercial without changing the pitch or adding or removing silence. It could also be used for a variety of musical effects.

Most audio tape recorders use fixed heads, which remain stationary while the tape moves past. However, the Eltro used rotating heads. It does not record sound and is used for audio playback only. Rotating heads were first devised by Ampex in the 1950s for analog videotape recording. The altered sound from playback on the Eltro was then usually copied by another reel-to-reel tape recorder.

Wendy Carlos, a musician and recording engineer, used an Eltro Mark II machine at Gotham Recording Studios in New York City in the 1960s. The Beach Boys used it for high-pitched vocal effects on the song "She's Goin' Bald", recorded in Los Angeles in 1967.

The Eltro is probably best known from use in the 1968 film 2001: A Space Odyssey. The effect of the Eltro was applied to the voice of Douglas Rain, who played the part of the HAL 9000 computer. In the film, both the pitch and speed of HAL's voice gradually drop at different rates while the computer is deactivated. The final effect was created by passing the actor's voice through the Eltro twice.

The Eltro worked with mono recordings and processed only one audio channel at a time. It fell out of common use during the 1970s. Later devices were developed to shift pitch by other electronic means. Many of these had stereo capability. With the widespread availability of digital recording in the 1980s, it got easier to control pitch and speed with software while avoiding expensive, special analog tools. Digital audio workstation software can now achieve the same effects more easily and at lower cost.

== See also ==
- Audio time stretching and pitch scaling
