= Tack piano =

Musical instrument

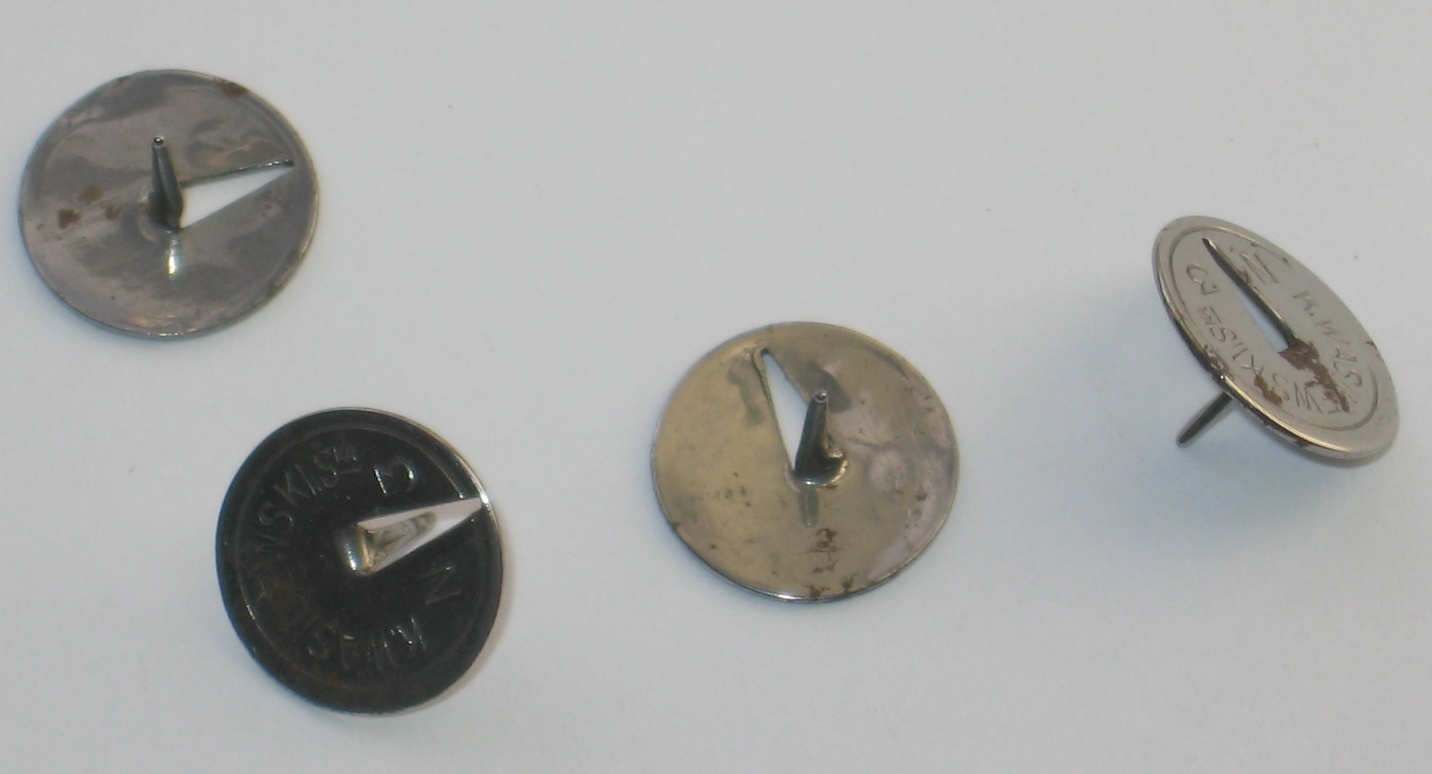
Thumbtacks such as these are sometimes pushed in the hammers of a piano to give the instrument a more percussive sound.

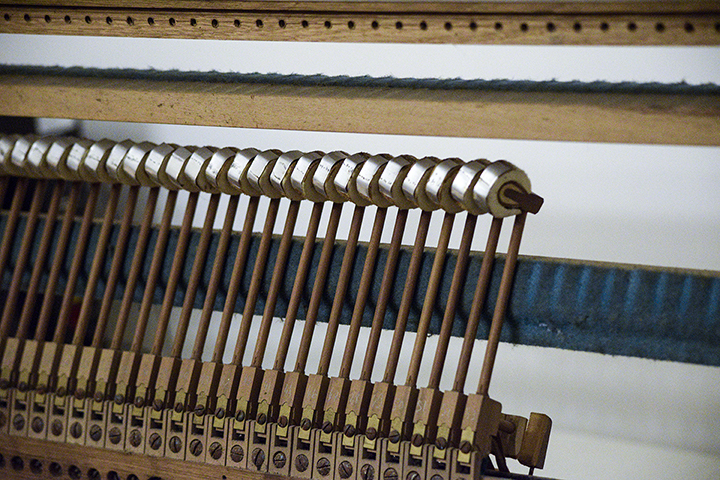
Piano hammers to which metal strips have been glued to give the special sound

A tack piano (also known as a harpsipiano, jangle piano, and junk piano) is a modified ordinary piano, in which objects such as thumbtacks or nails are placed on the felt-padded hammers of the instrument at the point where the hammers hit the strings, giving the instrument a tinny, more percussive sound. It is used to evoke the feeling of a honky-tonk piano.

Tack pianos are commonly associated with ragtime pieces, often appearing in Hollywood Western saloon scenes featuring old upright pianos. The instrument was originally used for classical music performances as a substitute for a harpsichord.

== Honky-tonk piano ==
A honky-tonk piano has a similar tone to a tack piano; however, the method of obtaining its sound is different, and simply involves one or more strings of each key being slightly detuned, without the use of tacks. The resultant sound produces acoustic beats in a manner similar to undulating organ stops.
