= Daniel Harrison (music theorist) =

American music theorist

Daniel Harrison (born April 20, 1959) is a music theorist, author, and former chairman of the Department of Music at Yale University. Most interested in tonal theory, Harrison wrote his dissertation on the music of Max Reger at Yale (PhD '86), which eventually became Harmonic Function in Chromatic Music: A Renewed Dualist Theory and an Account of Its Precedents (1994). Also interested in pop music, particularly The Beach Boys, he appeared in the Don Was documentary Brian Wilson: I Just Wasn't Made for These Times (1995). During his tenure at Yale, he was named the Allen Forte Professor of Music Theory in 2006 and Chairman in 2007. From 2001 to 2003 he was editor-in-chief of Music Theory Spectrum.

== Publications ==
Counterpoint and Fugue

- "Some group properties of triple counterpoint and their influence on compositions by J.S. Bach." Journal of Music Theory 32/1 (1988): 23-50.
- "Rhetoric and Fugue: An Analytical Application." Music Theory Spectrum 12/1 (1990): 1-42.
- "Heads and Tails: Subject Play in Bach's Fugues." Music Theory Spectrum 30/1 (2008): 152-163.

Chromatic Harmony

- "Max Reger's motivic technique: Harmonic innovations at the borders of atonality." Journal of Music Theory 35 (1991): 61-91.
- Harmonic Function in Chromatic Music: A Renewed Dualist Theory and an Account of Its Precedents (Chicago, 1994) ISBN 978-0-226-31809-7
- "Supplement to the theory of augmented-sixth chords." Music Theory Spectrum 17/2 (1995): 170-195.
- "Nonconformist notions of nineteenth-century enharmonicism." Music Analysis 21/2 (2002): 115-160.

Neo-Riemannian Theory

- "Three Short Essays on Neo-Riemannian Theory," in The Oxford Handbook of Neo-Riemannian Music Theory, ed. Edward Gollin and Alexander Rehding (Oxford, 2011): 548-577.

Popular Music

- "After sundown: The Beach Boys' experimental music." In Understanding Rock: Essays in Musical Analysis, ed. John Covach and Graeme M. Boone (Oxford, 1997). ISBN 978-0-195-10005-1.
