= Domenic Priore =

American author (born 1960)

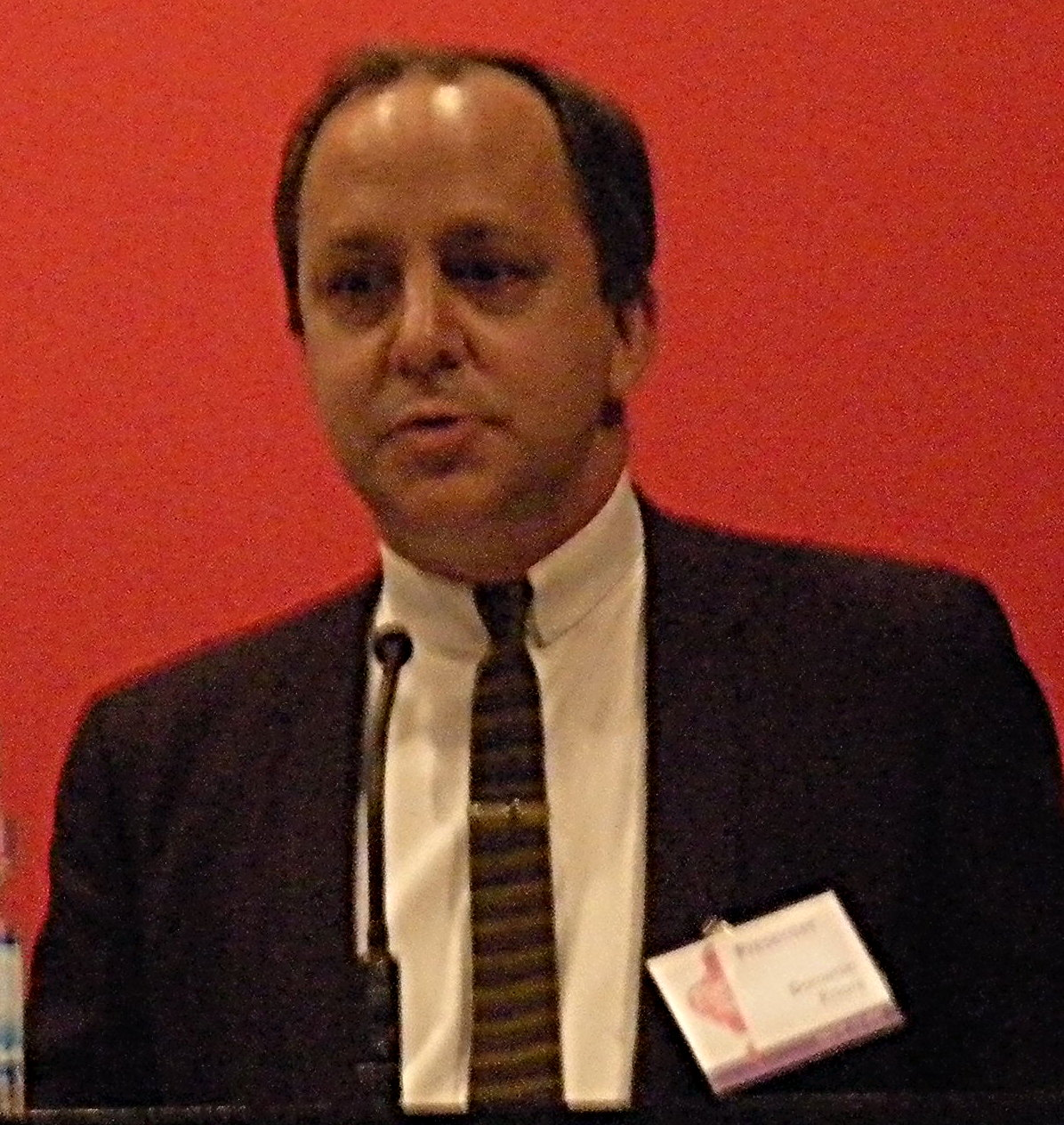
- Born: Domenic Priore; January 15th 1960 (age 66); Pasadena, California, United States
- Education: Pasadena City College
- Occupations: Author; popular music and culture historian; documentary writer; television producer
- Writing career
- Genres: American popular music, American popular culture
- Subjects: Psychedelia, counterculture of the 1960s
- Notable works: Look! Listen! Vibrate! Smile!, Smile: The Story of Brian Wilson's Lost Masterpiece, Riot on Sunset Strip: Rock 'n' Roll's Last Stand in Hollywood

Domenic Priore (born January 15, 1960) is an American author, historian and television producer whose focus is on popular music and its attendant youth culture.

== Biography ==
He has written extensively about the Beach Boys' album Smile, including two books on the subject, Look! Listen! Vibrate! Smile! and Smile: The Story of Brian Wilson's Lost Masterpiece. In 2011, he contributed to the liner notes of compilation album The Smile Sessions. He has also published a number of books and articles on the greater Los Angeles area's youth culture during the 1960s, with special focus on the surf craze and the Sunset Strip music scene.

Priore worked as the primary writer and creative consultant on the AMC documentaries Hollywood Rocks the Movies: The Early Years (1955–1970) and Hollywood Rocks the Movies: The 1970s.

== Publications ==
- Priore, Domenic (1988). Look, Listen, Vibrate, Smile: The Book about the Mysterious Beach Boys Album. Surfin' Colours Hollywood. ISBN 9780867194173.
- Priore, Domenic (2005). Smile: The Story of Brian Wilson's Lost Masterpiece. London: Sanctuary. ISBN 1860746276.
- Chidester, Brian; Priore, Domenic (2008). Pop Surf Culture: Music, Design, Film, and Fashion from the Bohemian Surf Boom. Santa Monica Press. ISBN 978-1-59580-035-0.
- Priore, Domenic (2007). Riot on Sunset Strip: Rock'N'Roll's Last Stand in Hollywood. Jawbone Press. ISBN 978-1-906002-94-7.
- Merritt, Christopher; Priore, Domenic (2014). Pacific Ocean Park: The Rise and Fall of Los Angeles' Space Age Nautical Pleasure Pier. Process. ISBN 978-1-934170-52-6.

== Filmography ==
- Hollywood Rocks the Movies: The Early Years (1955–1970) (2000, hosted by Ringo Starr)
- Hollywood Rocks the Movies: The 1970s (2002, hosted by David Bowie)
