= Mind If We Make Love to You =

Studio album by Wondermints
- Released: September 10, 2002
- Recorded: 2002
- Studios: Studio Thru Inner Space, Los Angeles, California, United States
- Genre: Power pop
- Length: 43:49
- Language: English
- Label: Smile Records
- Producer: The Wondermints

Wondermints chronology
Bali (1998)	Mind If We Make Love to You (2002)	Kaleidoscopin': Exploring Prisms of the Past (2009)

Professional ratings
Review scores
Source	Rating
AllMusic	4/5 stars
The Encyclopedia of Popular Music	3/5 stars
Uncut	4/5 stars

Mind If We Make Love to You is an album by the American power pop group Wondermints. It was released in 2002 on Smile Records. The album title, with its intentional lack of punctuation, is a take-off of Mind If I Make Love to You, an album of 1950s cocktail instrumentals in Darian Sahanaja's record collection.

Multiple configurations of the album have been released, in different parts of the world. Some pressings contain outtakes from the album sessions as well as Wondermints' cover of The Beatles' "Getting Better", which was originally submitted for use in a Philips commercial; the submission was rejected in favor of Gomez's version.

== Critical reception ==
PopMatters wrote that the songs "are more celebration than innovation, simple pleasures arranged in complex manner that delight the ear." The Sun Sentinel wrote that the band sounds "like a cross between Cheap Trick and the Beatles due to their love of power-pop harmonies and trippy lyrics."

== Track listing ==
1. "On the Run" – 3:10
2. "Ride" – 4:18
3. "Shine on Me" – 4:00
4. "Time Has You" – 3:05
5. "Another Way" – 3:37
6. "Project 11" – 3:41
7. "Out of Mind" – 3:47
8. "Sweetness" – 4:20
9. "If I Were You" – 3:44
10. "Something I Knew" – 2:55
11. "Listen" – 3:27
12. "So Nice" – 3:47

Rev-Ola 2002 reissue bonus tracks

13. "Out of Mind" (Alternate version) – 3:47
14. "Ride" (Instrumental) – 4:18

== Personnel ==
The Wondermints

- Mike D'Amico – percussion
- Darian Sahanaja – keyboards
- Nick Walusko – guitar

with

- Probyn Gregory – multiple instruments

Additional musicians

- Marc Daten – upright bass
- Colin Garner – viola
- Todd Jaeger – theremin
- Ana Lenchantin – cello, "Easter Island Girl"
- David Nolte – bass guitar
- Heidi Rodewald – oboe
- Evie Sands – background vocals on "Shine on Me"
- Debbie Shair – harp and recorder
- Martin St-Pierre – viola
- Brian Wilson – background vocals on "Ride" and "So Nice"

Production

- Ramón Bretón – Oceanview digital mastering
- Mark Linett – Additional recording
- Darian Sahanaja with Steve Stanley – Art Direction|Design
- Taro Yoshida, Robert Matheu, & Shad Sluiter – Photography
