= War Child Presents Heroes =

2009 compilation album by various artists

Compilation album by various artists
- Released: 16 February 2009
- Genre: Various
- Label: Parlophone (Europe); Astralwerks (US); Distribution Select (Canada)
- Producer: War Child

War Child charity albums chronology
Help: A Day in the Life (2005)	War Child Presents Heroes (2009)	Help(2) (2026)

Professional ratings
Review scores
Source	Rating
Entertainment Weekly	(B)
Pitchfork Media	(7.0/10)
Robert Christgau	(3-star Honorable Mention)
Rolling Stone	4/5 stars
USA Today	3.5/4 stars

War Child Presents Heroes is a 2009 charity album devoted to the War Child charity's aid efforts in war-stricken areas, such as Iraq, Uganda, Afghanistan and the Democratic Republic of Congo. With a theme of "placing faith in the next generation," the concept of the album is to have music legends select a track from their own canon and nominate an artist from the next generation to create a modern reworking of that song.

The album was recorded over six months in London, Manchester, Paris, Berlin, New York, and Los Angeles, and mastered at Abbey Road Studios in North London. Previous War Child charity albums include The Help Album (1995), 1 Love (2002), Hope (2003) and Help: A Day in the Life (2005).

== Release ==
While initial reports indicated the album would be released on 24 November 2008, on 7 October, it was announced that the release date would be pushed back to February 2009 due to an overwhelming interest from musicians hoping to contribute to the compilation. On 17 December, a release date of 16 February 2009 was announced.

== Track listing ==
- Original artists listed in parentheses.

=== European edition ===
1. Beck – "Leopard-Skin Pill-Box Hat" (Bob Dylan)
2. Scissor Sisters – "Do the Strand" (Roxy Music)
3. Lily Allen and Mick Jones – "Straight to Hell" (The Clash)
4. Duffy – "Live and Let Die" (Paul McCartney and Wings)
5. Elbow – "Running to Stand Still" (U2)
6. TV on the Radio – "Heroes" (David Bowie)
7. Hot Chip – "Transmission" (Joy Division)
8. The Kooks – "Victoria" (The Kinks)
9. Estelle – "Superstition" (Stevie Wonder)
10. Rufus Wainwright – "Wonderful/Song For Children" (Brian Wilson)
11. Peaches – "Search and Destroy" (The Stooges)
12. The Hold Steady – "Atlantic City" (Bruce Springsteen)
13. The Like – "You Belong to Me" (Elvis Costello)
14. Yeah Yeah Yeahs – "Sheena Is a Punk Rocker" (Ramones)
15. Franz Ferdinand – "Call Me" (Live) (Blondie)

=== North American edition ===
The album has a different sequence in North America, including an additional track by Adam Cohen.

1. Beck – "Leopard-Skin Pill-Box Hat" (Bob Dylan)
2. The Kooks – "Victoria" (The Kinks)
3. The Hold Steady – "Atlantic City" (Bruce Springsteen)
4. Hot Chip – "Transmission" (Joy Division)
5. Lily Allen and Mick Jones – "Straight to Hell" (The Clash)
6. Yeah Yeah Yeahs – "Sheena Is a Punk Rocker" (Ramones)
7. Franz Ferdinand – "Call Me" (Live) (Blondie)
8. Duffy – "Live and Let Die" (Paul McCartney and Wings)
9. Estelle – "Superstition" (Stevie Wonder)
10. Rufus Wainwright – "Wonderful/Song For Children" (Brian Wilson)
11. Scissor Sisters – "Do the Strand" (Roxy Music)
12. Peaches – "Search and Destroy" (The Stooges)
13. Adam Cohen – "Take This Waltz" (Leonard Cohen)
14. Elbow – "Running to Stand Still" (U2)
15. The Like – "You Belong to Me" (Elvis Costello)
16. TV on the Radio – "Heroes" (David Bowie)
