= Gettin' In over My Head =

Studio album by Brian Wilson
- Released: June 22, 2004
- Recorded: 1996, 2002–04
- Genre: Rock
- Length: 53:08
- Label: Brimel/Rhino
- Producer: Brian Wilson

Brian Wilson chronology
Pet Sounds Live (2002)	Gettin' In over My Head (2004)	Brian Wilson Presents Smile (2004)

Gettin' In over My Head is the fourth studio album by American musician Brian Wilson, released June 2004 on Rhino Records. Many of the songs were reworked versions of tracks recorded for the scrapped album Sweet Insanity and the Andy Paley sessions from the 1990s. The album reached #100 in the US during a 1-week chart stay, and #53 in the UK. Critical reaction was mixed.

It features an assortment of celebrity guests such as Paul McCartney, Elton John, Eric Clapton and Carl Wilson (the latter appearing posthumously on "Soul Searchin'", a rejected Beach Boys song from the Paley sessions). Peter Blake created the cover art and assigned 2004 Brian Wilson Presents Smile artist Mark London to art-direct the rest of the package.

As of 2026, the album is not available on streaming services. Despite this, "Soul Searchin'" and the title track can be heard digitally on Playback: The Brian Wilson Anthology.

== Background ==
Most tracks from the album are rerecorded versions of songs dating from Wilson's unreleased Sweet Insanity and Andy Paley sessions from the 1990s. "Soul Searchin'" features a posthumous guest appearance by Carl Wilson, sourced from the Paley sessions. Furthermore, with the concurrent live performances of the recently completed Smile album, and the announcement of its impending issue on CD, completely overshadowed Gettin' In Over My Head's release, with most attention going to the former. There was a limited edition set of prints created by artist Peter Blake in 2004.

One songwriter who was reached for a collaboration was XTC's Andy Partridge who recalled, "I rang up a lot of people ... and heard quite a few stories that would put off any sane person from getting involved in the Brian Wilson camp ... They said he would call me ... either he changed his mind, or the management changed his mind, or maybe he just forgot".

== Reception ==
Professional ratings
Aggregate scores
Source	Rating
Metacritic	55/100
Review scores
Source	Rating
AllMusic	3/5 stars
The Austin Chronicle	2/5 stars
Blender	2/5 stars
E!	C+
The Guardian	2/5 stars
The Independent	2/5 stars
Q	4/5 stars
The Rolling Stone Album Guide	3/5 stars
Stylus	D+
Uncut	3/5 stars

At Metacritic, which assigns a normalized rating out of 100 to reviews from critics, Gettin' In Over My Head received an average score of 55 based on 14 reviews, indicating "mixed or average reviews". Writing in The Rolling Stone Album Guide, reviewer Jackie Wilson wrote, "Wilson is still frighteningly detached from the moment. ... it's best to think of this one as a celebrity's children's record." Critic Robert Christgau said that the album's only improvement on Imagination was the absence of producer Joe Thomas.

John Bush of AllMusic highlighted "Soul Searchin'" and the title track in what was otherwise a collection of "weak songs" with "trite lyrics". He wrote, "Whether it's a solo composition or one written with a talented collaborator like Andy Paley, Wilson's songs are uniformly embarrassing". The Guardian's Alexis Petridis was disappointed with the record's "musical conservatism" – which be believed came out of Wilson's self-described desperation to be considered in league with Sting, Paul Simon, and Bruce Springsteen – and wrote, "The worst thing about Gettin' In Over My Head - far worse than the mediocre songs and the MOR guest appearances - is that it doesn't sound terribly happy."

Matthew Weiner of Stylus introduced his review by declaring, "It's time to face the facts: we’re never, never, ever getting another great record out of Brian Wilson again. It's over." He added that, given the involvement of the Wondermints and all the other musicians and songwriters Wilson could have potentially collaborated with, "it's impossible to conclude that the utter failure of Getting In Over My Head falls anywhere other than squarely on Wilson himself". Three months later, Wilson released Brian Wilson Presents Smile, which was ranked number 399 on Rolling Stone's 2020 list of "The 500 Greatest Albums of All Time", and is the third-highest rated album in the history of Metacritic.

Conversely, Uncut's reviewer said the album was "the most consistent and sympathetically constructed solo album he's made." Billboard's review called it "An unexpected but dazzling return to the top form of the later Beach Boys years."

== Track listing ==
No.	Title	Writer(s)	Length
1.	"How Could We Still Be Dancin?" (featuring Elton John)	Brian Wilson, Joe Thomas	4:42
2.	"Soul Searchin'" (featuring Carl Wilson)	B. Wilson, Andy Paley	4:07
3.	"You've Touched Me"	B. Wilson, Steve Kalinich	3:21
4.	"Gettin' In Over My Head"	B. Wilson, Paley	4:27
5.	"City Blues" (featuring Eric Clapton)	B. Wilson, Scott Bennett	4:20
6.	"Desert Drive"	B. Wilson, Paley	3:34
7.	"A Friend Like You" (featuring Paul McCartney)	B. Wilson, Kalinich	3:37
8.	"Make a Wish"		3:49
9.	"Rainbow Eyes"		4:06
10.	"Saturday Morning in the City"	B. Wilson, Paley	2:53
11.	"Fairy Tale"	B. Wilson, David Foster	5:28
12.	"Don't Let Her Know She's an Angel"		4:17
13.	"The Waltz"	B. Wilson, Van Dyke Parks	4:09

- Tracks 8–9 and 11–13 were originally recorded for the scrapped Sweet Insanity album
- An iTunes bonus track of "Don't Worry Baby" was released with daughter Wendy Wilson on lead vocals.
- Recorded and mixed by Mark Linett at Your Place Or Mine Recording

== Personnel ==
- Brian Wilson – lead and background vocals, piano, keyboards; producer

Guests

- Eric Clapton – lead guitar on "City Blues"
- Elton John – vocals and piano on "How Could We Still Be Dancin"
- Paul McCartney – vocals and acoustic guitar on "A Friend Like You"
- Carl Wilson – vocals on "Soul Searchin'"

The Brian Wilson Band

- Scott Bennett – keyboards, vibraphone, percussion, bass, guitar, additional background vocals on "Desert Drive"
- Jeffrey Foskett – guitar, additional background vocals on "Desert Drive"
- Probyn Gregory – guitar, French horn, trumpet, keyboards, trombone
- Bob Lizik – bass
- Paul Mertens – saxophones, flutes, harmonica, clarinet
- Darian Sahanaja – piano, keyboards, vibraphone, percussion, additional background vocals on "Desert Drive"
- Nick Walusko – guitar

Additional musicians

- Amy Farris – viola, violin
- Jim Hines – percussion
- Sandra Jensen – violin
- Peter Kent – violin
- Greg Leisz – guitar
- Michael Rhodes – bass guitar
- Andy Paley – percussion, additional background vocals on "Desert Drive"
- Carol Robbins – harp
- Rudolph Stein – cello
- Todd Sucherman – drums, percussion
- Joe Thomas – keyboards
