= Wonderful (The Beach Boys song) =

1967 song by the Beach Boys

Song by the Beach Boys

from the album Smiley Smile
- Released: September 18, 1967
- Recorded: 1967
- Length: 2:21
- Label: Brother; Capitol
- Songwriters: Brian Wilson; Van Dyke Parks
- Producer: The Beach Boys

Licensed audio
- "Wonderful" on YouTube

Audio sample
- file; help

"Wonderful"

Song by the Beach Boys

from the album Good Vibrations: Thirty Years of the Beach Boys
- Released: July 29, 1993
- Recorded: August 25 – December 15, 1966
- Studio: Western and Columbia, Hollywood
- Genre: Chamber pop; baroque pop
- Length: 2:02
- Label: Capitol
- Songwriters: Brian Wilson; Van Dyke Parks
- Producer: Brian Wilson

Licensed audio
- "Wonderful" on YouTube

Audio sample
- file; help

"Wonderful" is a song by the American rock band the Beach Boys from their 1967 album Smiley Smile and their unfinished Smile project. Written by Brian Wilson and Van Dyke Parks, it was their only collaboration that resulted in a love song, telling the story of a young girl's sexual awakening and its disruption of her devotion to God and her parents.

Numerous early versions of the song were recorded by the group from August 1966 to April 1967 at three different Hollywood studios. It was originally sung by Wilson with harpsichord and trumpet as accompaniment. The Smiley Smile reworking was recorded in a single three-hour session at his makeshift home studio. This version featured Carl Wilson on lead vocal, supported by piano and organ, and a 35-second doo-wop interlude.

The original Smile version was released on the compilations Good Vibrations: Thirty Years of the Beach Boys (1993) and The Smile Sessions (2011). Brian rerecorded the song for his solo albums I Just Wasn't Made for These Times (1995) and Brian Wilson Presents Smile (2004). In the latter, it begins the album's second movement and segues into "Song for Children". Cover versions of "Wonderful" have been recorded by artists including Nikki Sudden, David Garland, Adventures in Stereo, and Rufus Wainwright.

== Background and lyrics ==
"Wonderful" is one of the numerous songs Brian Wilson and Van Dyke Parks wrote for the Beach Boys' unfinished album Smile. The song title derived from a pet name Wilson had for his then-wife Marilyn. It was the only "boy/girl song" written for the project. Van Dyke Parks recalled,

Musically, it's entirely different from anything else. and I thought that it was a place, an opportunity, to begin a love song. I remember Brian pressing me about the relationship between the mother and the father and the child. And this is the guy who wrote "When I Grow Up (To Be A Man)", the guy who is becoming a man. I really think that he was thinking about his own personal progression from childhood. Now I thought, once we had gotten "Heroes And Villains" done, we might have seen a boy/girl song emerge, other than "Wonderful". Honestly, I really thought we would do it, but I never found an opportunity to pursue that with the music I was given.

The lyrics tell the story of a girl whose meeting with a boy disrupts her devotion to God and her parents. Wilson commented, "A sweet song all about a girl who just stays in her little world, you know? And then she bumps into a boy, and then she gets her heart broken, then she goes back to her 'Wonderful.'"

Of the songs on Smile, some of which deal with spiritual themes, "Wonderful" is the only one that refers to God explicitly. Music journalist David Zahl wrote that although "The Lord gets a mention in 'Wonderful'", it is "mainly as a somewhat creepy device to deal with adolescent sexuality." Biographer Mark Dillon interpreted the interlude on the Smiley Smile rendition as a musical representation of the female protagonist's sexual awakening.

Parks was not credited for co-writing "Wonderful" when it was first published. He was awarded an official writing credit after broaching the issue with Wilson in 2003.

== Recording ==
=== Smile sessions ===
"Wonderful" was one of the first songs attempted for Smile, and according to historian Keith Badman, none of the Smile recordings of "Wonderful" were finished versions of the song. The original is a harpsichord-led arrangement supported by trumpet and the group's backing vocals.

The basic track for the first version was recorded on August 25, 1966, at Western Studio. It took 18 takes to record; Wilson had trouble playing the harpsichord. At one point in the session, he remarked to engineer Chuck Britz, "Some of these notes are fucking up. I swear to God. You push them and they don't go." On October 6, Wilson overdubbed a lead vocal onto the track. Drums and other instruments are also added to the track during the session. Wilson then created a rough mix of the track. Further vocals were recorded for the song on December 15 at Columbia Studio.

On January 9, 1967, the second version (known as the "Rock with Me Henry" version) was recorded at Western. (Note: Slowinski could not determine when and where the vocals of this version were overdubbed.) Badman speculated that Wilson "consider[ed] this another potential candidate for the B-side of 'Heroes and Villains'." A third version of the song, with piano as the sole accompaniment, was recorded by the band around April 10 at Armin Steiner's Sound Recorders Studio. On April 29, publicist Derek Taylor reported that a single, "Vegetables" backed with "Wonderful", would soon be released. Regarding "Wonderful", he wrote, "I only heard [it] improvised at the piano with the boys humming the theme for Paul [McCartney]."

=== Smiley Smile sessions ===
From June to July 1967, the Beach Boys recorded simplified versions of Smile-period songs, including "Wonderful", for the forthcoming album Smiley Smile. According to Dillon, "Wonderful" had "the most radical reinterpretation". It was recorded in one three-hour session at Wilson's makeshift home studio. Carl Wilson sang the lead vocal with piano and organ as accompaniment.

This version omitted one verse from the original lyrics. Instead, the section consists of a 35-second interlude described by Dillon as "a left turn into a hash den". Dillon believed that, amid the group's giggling and nonsense doo-wop chanting, the phrase "don't think you're God" can be heard in the mass of voices.

== "Wonderbill" ==
In 1972, the Beach Boys performed "Wonderful" at numerous concert dates in medley with the Flames' song "Don't Worry Bill". They nicknamed the medley "Wonderbill".

== Recognition ==
Reviewing the 2001 CD reissue of Smiley Smile for Pitchfork, Spencer Owen praised the song as featuring one of Wilson's best melodies, although he also felt the Smiley Smile rendition did not do it justice, commenting, "the Smiley Smile version is gorgeous enough, but it nearly pales in comparison to the stripped-down harpsichord and heartbreaking harmonies of the original." Dillon characterized the Smile version as "proto-psychedelic chamber pop" and the Smiley Smile rendition as "Beach Boys' Party! on acid." He wrote, "If Smile was indeed shelved in part because any band members found the music too weird, it is inconceivable that they would have seen this as any more accessible."

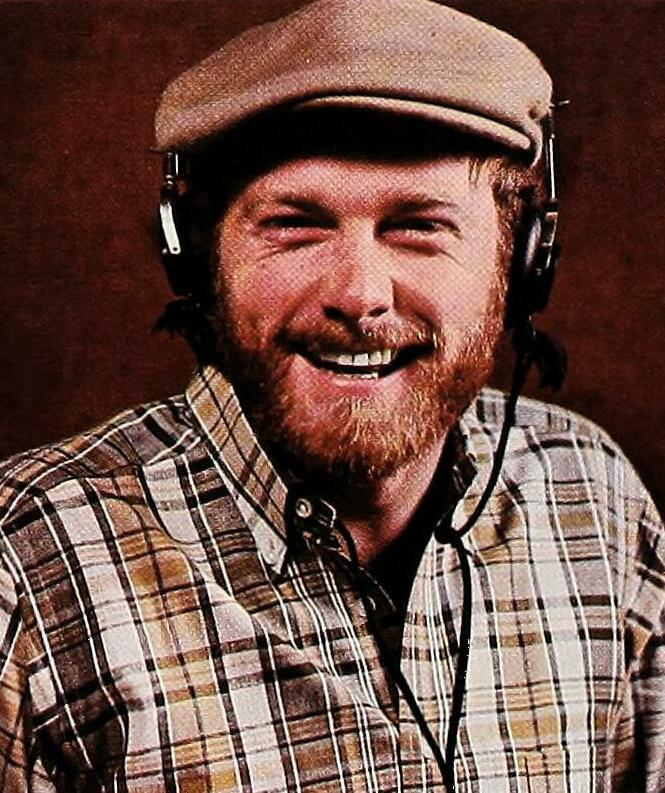
Mike Love cited "Wonderful" as his favorite song on Smile

For his curation of the 2002 compilation Classics Selected by Brian Wilson, Wilson chose the Smiley Smile version of "Wonderful" as one of his favorite songs by the Beach Boys. It is also Mike Love's favorite song from Smile. In a 2011 interview, he commended Parks' "marvelous job" with the lyrics and described the piece as beautiful, sensitive, and possessing the ability to move listeners to tears. In 2012, he added, "'Wonderful' is an amazing, amazing piece of work. Holy shit! Van Dyke and Brian did a great collaboration on that one. It’s a really beautiful song. That’s probably my favorite thing from the Smile project."

Among other musicians, Matthew Sweet praised the Smile version for its baroque feel, although he decreed, the song "gets a little more trivialized on Smiley Smile". Wondermints co-founder Darian Sahanaja said, "I remember around 1984 or ’85 getting one of the first cassettes with Smile bootlegs floating around and hearing this version of 'Wonderful' with Brian playing harpsichord. That pretty much changed my life. It sounded to me like the natural link between Pet Sounds and 'Heroes & Villains.' So amazing. Even now, when I think of Smile I think of that piece."

== Release history ==
"Wonderful"

Single by Brian Wilson

from the album Brian Wilson Presents Smile
- B-side: "Wind Chimes"
- Released: September 20, 2004
- Recorded: 2004
- Length: 2:01
- Label: Nonesuch Records
- Songwriters: Brian Wilson, Van Dyke Parks
- Producer: Brian Wilson

Brian Wilson singles chronology
"Your Imagination" (1998)	"Wonderful" (2004)	"Good Vibrations" (2004)

Licensed audio
- "Wonderful" on YouTube

- In 1993, the original Smile version was released on the compilation Good Vibrations: Thirty Years of the Beach Boys.
- In 1995, Wilson performed the Smile version of "Wonderful" for the documentary I Just Wasn't Made for These Times. The rendition was included on the accompanying soundtrack album.
- In 1998, a live rendition from 1972 was included on the compilation Endless Harmony Soundtrack.
- In 2004, Wilson rerecorded the song for Brian Wilson Presents Smile, where it begins the second movement before segueing into "Song for Children". He released this version as the album's second single.
- In 2011, several alternate versions of the song were included on the compilation The Smile Sessions.
- In 2013, a live rendition from 1993 was included on the compilation Made in California.

== Personnel ==
Per band archivist Craig Slowinski, the following credits pertain to the Smile versions.

Version 1 (recorded August 25 – December 15, 1966)

- Al Jardine – backing vocals
- Bruce Johnston – backing vocals
- Larry Knechtel – grand piano
- Mike Love – backing vocals
- Lyle Ritz – upright bass, overdubbed tenor ukulele
- Alan Weight – trumpet
- Brian Wilson – lead and backing vocals, harpsichord
- Carl Wilson – backing vocals
- Dennis Wilson – backing vocals

Version 2 – "Rock with Me Henry" (recorded January 9, 1967)

- Hal Blaine – overdubbed drums
- Carol Kaye – Danelectro fuzz bass (uncertain edit)
- Ray Pohlman – overdubbed mandolin (uncertain credit)
- Lyle Ritz – overdubbed upright bass
- Brian Wilson – backing vocals, harpsichord
- Carl Wilson – lead and backing vocals

Version 3 (recorded April 10, 1967 [uncertain date])

- Al Jardine – vocals
- Mike Love – doubletracked vocals
- Brian Wilson – vocals, grand piano
- Carl Wilson – vocals

== Cover versions ==
- 1990 – Nikki Sudden & the Mermaids, Smiles, Vibes & Harmony: A Tribute to Brian Wilson
- 1993 – David Garland, I Guess I Just Wasn't Made for These Times
- 1996 – Outrageous Cherry, Stereo Action Rant Party
- 1998 – Adventures in Stereo, Smiling Pets
- 1998 – Sportsguitar, Smiling Pets
- 2009 – Rufus Wainwright, War Child Presents Heroes
- 2020 - Glenn Tilbrook,

== Bibliography ==
- Badman, Keith (2004). The Beach Boys: The Definitive Diary of America's Greatest Band, on Stage and in the Studio. Backbeat Books. ISBN 978-0-87930-818-6.
- Dillon, Mark (2012). Fifty Sides of the Beach Boys: The Songs That Tell Their Story. ECW Press. ISBN 978-1-77090-198-8.
- Lambert, Philip (2007). Inside the Music of Brian Wilson: The Songs, Sounds, and Influences of the Beach Boys' Founding Genius. Continuum. ISBN 978-0-8264-1876-0.
- Priore, Domenic, ed. (1995). Look, Listen, Vibrate, Smile!. San Francisco: Last Gasp. ISBN 0-86719-417-0.
- Priore, Domenic (2005). Smile: The Story of Brian Wilson's Lost Masterpiece. London: Sanctuary. ISBN 1860746276.
