= Polly Tones =

Swedish acoustic duo

- Origin: London, Sweden
- Genres: Acoustic rock Alternative; Folk; Singer-songwriter
- Years active: 2008–present
- Members: Malin Dahlgren; Viktor Näslund
- Website: http://www.myspace.com/pollytones

Polly Tones is acoustic Swedish duo consisting of Malin Dahlgren (vocals) and Viktor Näslund (guitar). Their music can be described as experimental acoustic pop with romantic and folk overtones.

== History ==
Malin and Viktor met in their small home town of Umeå, Northern Sweden. They collaborated under several different names before finally adopting their permanent identity as the Polly Tones. In 2008, the duo moved to London and have been living there since.

== Albums ==
– Polly Tones' first EP Take this Pill was released in late 2008. A second EP, The Toast, was released in November 2011, consisting of the tracks In My Room, Waiting, Midnight on a Bus and The Toast.

– A new album is currently being recorded and was set to be released by Safety First Records in 2011.

== Other facts ==
– On Friday 30 October 2009 Polly Tones was chosen as Band of the Day by the British newspaper The Guardian

– Polly Tones are also known for their well received cover of Brian Wilson's SMiLE using just Malin's voice and Viktor's guitar. Music journalist Paul Lester described it as: "in conception and execution,[it] is a work of genius. It's amazing."

– Malin and Viktor regularly collaborate with the London-based band Klak Tik.
