= Andy Paley sessions =

Unfinished album by Brian Wilson and Andy Paley

- Cover artwork from an unofficial CD bootleg which pictures Paley (left) and Wilson (right)

Studio album (unreleased) by Brian Wilson & Andy Paley with the Beach Boys
- Recorded: 1987–2008
- Studios: Your Place or Mine (Glendale); Brian's home studio (Malibu); Chomsky Ranch (Los Angeles); Ocean Way Recording (Los Angeles)
- Producers: Brian Wilson; Andy Paley; Don Was

The "Andy Paley sessions" (also referred to as the "Wilson-Paley sessions") is the unofficial name given to an unfinished recording project by American musicians Brian Wilson and Andy Paley. During the 1990s, the duo planned to record an album that would have comprised original material written and produced by themselves with participation from other members of the Beach Boys. It was the last time Brian worked with his bandmates on original material before his brother Carl Wilson's death in 1998.

Wilson and Paley had previously collaborated on Wilson's solo albums Brian Wilson (1988) and Sweet Insanity (unreleased). In February 1992, California courts issued a restraining order on Wilson's former psychologist Eugene Landy. The next day, Wilson phoned Paley explaining that they were now free to produce whatever they wanted. Without an album or recording contract in mind, the two proceeded to write and record several dozen songs that reflected Wilson's artistic sensibilities more than any work since The Beach Boys Love You (1977). In the meantime, he completed two albums for 1995: I Just Wasn't Made for These Times with Don Was and Orange Crate Art with Van Dyke Parks.

Many personal and legal conflicts prevented the album from being completed. Contemporary reports stated that Wilson was influenced by his wife and advisors to abandon the Paley recordings in favor of more commercial adult contemporary projects with River North Records owner Joe Thomas. Since then, several Paley collaborations have seen official release across Wilson's albums, though many more circulate on bootlegs.

== Background ==
Andy Paley first met Brian Wilson and the Beach Boys in the late 1970s. His first major project with Wilson was the album Brian Wilson (1988), which Paley later called "a pretty good record ... [but] there were too many cooks and Brian wasn't really calling the shots." Some songs from the album drew from close to 170 rough tape demos kept in briefcases next to Wilson's piano. Paley said: "There's great stuff, but there are also what I call 'hamburger songs'. A lot of those are real junk" (referring to songs Brian composed in exchange for hamburgers from his brother Dennis). After they worked on the material for several months, additional producers and songwriters were called in for Wilson. The duo reteamed for the recording of Sweet Insanity, which Paley called "even less real Brian than the first one". It was left unreleased.

I don't think that anyone really knows where I'm at now. It's funny. People look at me I think as somebody who used to write songs for the Beach Boys, and is sort of inactive

— Brian Wilson, January 1995

In February 1992, on the day after California courts issued a restraining order on therapist Eugene Landy from contacting Wilson, Wilson phoned Paley to work on an assortment of recordings destined for a potential album which could have featured some involvement with the Beach Boys. Paley remembered that Wilson would speak of each song's vocal arrangement in terms of which parts the Beach Boys would sing. Wilson called it "some of the best material I've done in a real long time", adding that he is "baffled" why Smile (whose recordings were still largely unreleased) continued to attract attention, saying: "Things are so different now. The new material just kicks the shit out of Smile."

Sessions coincided with the recording of I Just Wasn't Made for These Times (1995) and the Brian Wilson–Van Dyke Parks collaboration Orange Crate Art (1995) in addition to his brief writing collaboration with power pop band Jellyfish. The band's co-founder Roger Manning told Rocky Mountain News in 1993: "Brian's an amazing guy and still has a lot of musical ideas. ... People ask me what he's like, and I've said he's like a really powerful computer with a really bad printer."

== Songs and production ==
The material Wilson and Paley wrote ranged from full-blown rockers to delicate ballads. Their writing process involved one or the other convening at each other's house to sketch ideas on a boombox and contribute musical or lyrical ideas until the song was ready to be recorded in a professional studio with session musicians paid for by Wilson. Paley said: "We've just been doing what he [Brian] likes to do — the kind of records he's always liked; I don't try to change anything in any way — his vision of what he wants." Wilson described Paley as a multi-instrumentalist with "a lot of talent for anything you can think of. ... He's the most frighteningly talented person that I've met, and the most serious about music." Biographer Peter Ames Carlin wrote of the material,

Brian's new songs bore none of the stamps that had come to define latter-day Beach Boys songs – no references to beaches or surf, no self-conscious attempts to seem younger than the singers' actual years – they did reflect more of Brian's musical, emotional, and intellectual interests than any series of songs he'd recorded since The Beach Boys Love You.

"Gettin' In over My Head" was written for the film Grace of My Heart (1995), a fictionalized account of the 1960s Brill Building era that included a character based on Wilson. "Soul Searchin'" was envisioned as a Philadelphia soul-sounding record; Solomon Burke later recorded a version for his album Don't Give Up on Me (2002). "You're Still a Mystery", according to Paley, was "a 50/50 collaboration ... except for the bridge, which Brian wrote by himself." "God Did It" was largely written by Paley and inspired by Beach Boys songs such as "He Come Down" and "That Same Song". "Chain Reaction of Love" contains various percussion that was meant to evoke the song's "chain reaction" theme. "Elbow '63" is an autobiographical song about Wilson's competition with bands such as the Beatles.

Other titles included "Slightly American Music", "I'm Broke", "It's Not Easy Bein' Me", "Marketplace", "Proud Mary" (a cover of the John Fogerty song), "Desert Drive", "Frankie Avalon", "Dancin' the Night Away", "Off My Chest", "This Song's Gonna Sleep with You Tonight", "Saturday Morning in the City", "This Could Be the Night" (a cover of the Harry Nilsson song), "I'm Goin' Home", "I'm Psyched", "Mary Ann", "Stay Right Here in Heaven", "Must Be a Miracle", "In My Moondreams", "Where Has Love Been", "Rodney on the ROQ", and "Pleasure Island".

== Initial sessions ==
The Wilson–Paley recordings span 1987–2008, though the main 1990s sessions commenced in spring 1992 and lasted until fall 1994 at Mark Linett's Your Place or Mine recording studio in Glendale, California. Weeks after Mike Love successfully sued Wilson for songwriting credits – which resulted in Wilson losing $5 million – Wilson told MOJO in February 1995: "Mike and I are just cool. There's a lot of shit Andy and I got written for him. I just had to get through that goddamn trial!"

Two weeks after the trial, Love invited Wilson to his home in Lake Tahoe for a "serious" songwriting session, in which they wrote one song tentatively slated for the television show Baywatch Nights. Wilson said in March 1995: "I'm trying to get used to our new thing, and I think I will. It's so hard, you know. I feel like I'm on the spot, and I don't like that feeling." Next month, in April, it was unclear whether the project would turn into a Wilson solo album, a Beach Boys album, or a combination of the two. Paley told Billboard: "We've got 30 things in various stages of development. Sometimes Brian says 'Yeah, let's put the Beach Boys' voices on this,' and other times he's not so into it, so I don't know how it's going to work out." In August, Wilson announced he had "40 incredible songs" and "would be damned if we can only have 10 or 12 of them on one album". That month, friction between Brian and the Beach Boys was reported in Mojo, with Paley alleging that Love had attempted to rewrite some of the material.

Those guys [the Beach Boys] are assholes. ... I'll work on my own, solo, before I work with a bunch of guys that don’t give a shit about me.

— Brian Wilson, 1995

Further recording was produced by Brian and Don Was in November 1995. Was expressed excitement after sifting through the pile of demo tapes Brian and Paley had provided. By his account, the group "were a little cynical, but they didn't hesitate. ... Everybody got along and it was a lovely couple of days. There wasn't a tense moment and the results were pretty good." Paley remembered: "We had meetings and everything was getting rolling. ... Everyone was so happy to be there ... First I thought: 'Wow, this could really happen.' And when Carl sang 'Soul Searchin',' it was like ... wow this really is going to happen!" However, as reported by the magazine Request, "When he [Brian] played some of the new tracks for the Beach Boys ... the members were politely supportive, but ultimately declined his invitation."

According to historian Andrew Doe, Carl had abruptly walked out of the backing vocals session for "Dancin' the Night Away". Camera crews were present for the song's recording, which was intended to be used for Baywatch Nights. Some vocals for the song's bridge were recorded by Carl, but others including Brian failed to get Love to sing. Shortly after, Paley said that the album was unlikely to become a Beach Boys record: "Brian and I had a meeting with Mike Love and he listened to everything and Brian really stuck up for these songs and told him he didn't want them changed in any way. I know he's so anxious for this music to come out, and I know I am too." Brian later blamed Carl for the project's stalling. He said that Carl disliked the song "Soul Searchin'", and did not want it released. Brian's wife and soon-to-be manager Melinda Ledbetter also blamed Carl, saying that he did not believe the music was commercial enough. (Note: David Leaf was Brian's manager at this time.)

== Further conflicts ==
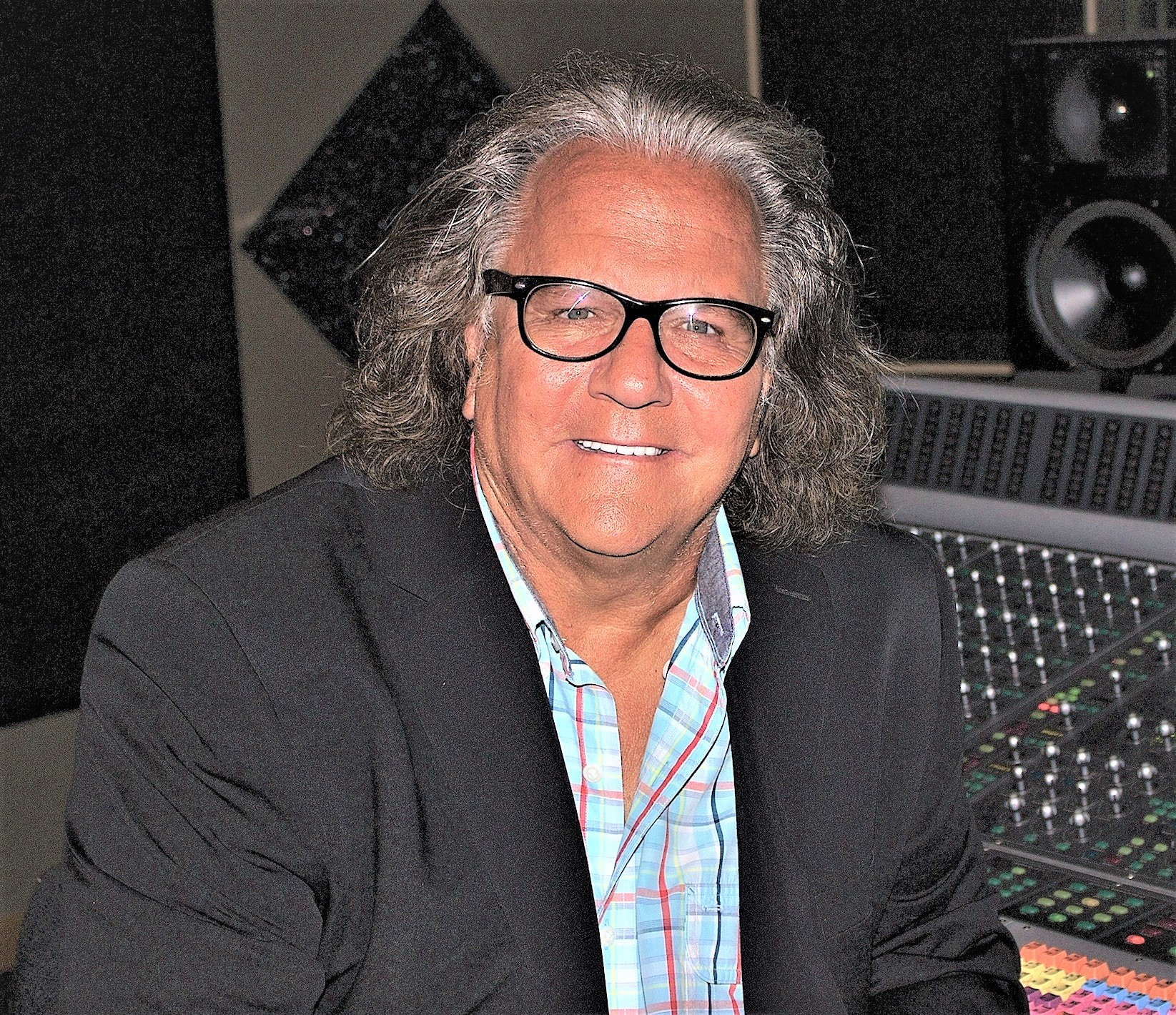
Contemporary reports state that Wilson was pressured to abandon the Paley collaboration in favor of an album with River North Records owner Joe Thomas (pictured 2017)

Music businessman and former wrestler Joe Thomas, owner of River North Records, was enlisted to co-produce the Beach Boys' album Stars and Stripes Vol. 1, an album composed of country music stars covering Beach Boys songs, for which Brian was a participant. Love said: "I have no idea why [a proper reunion album] didn't come together. I think everyone was willing to do it. I'm not sure how eager, but certainly willing." (Note: He wrote in his 2016 autobiography that Brian "entered a new phase" after marrying Ledbetter in 1995. She became Brian's conservator, and in November, her lawyer sent a letter to Love's with a list of financial demands to compensate for Love's recent litigation.) Don Was reflected that he felt responsible for "stopping the momentum" after suggesting that Brian's songs were not up to his standards: "He said, 'Yeah I agree with you.' And then Carl was sick and it just never happened." Stars and Stripes Vol. 1 was issued by River North in August 1996. In music critic Stephen Thomas Erlewine's description, the release was "an unmitigated disaster and an outright embarrassment for all involved".

The High Llamas were brought to the Beach Boys' attention after Bruce Johnston heard their 1996 album Hawaii. Attempts to coordinate a collaboration between Brian and the High Llamas' Sean O'Hagan were unsuccessful. According to Peter Ames Carlin, it was Carl who proposed that Brian work with O'Hagan, but Brian showed little interest. O'Hagan said that Thomas' involvement (specifically the "middle of the road" style he was influencing Wilson toward) was one reason why the High Llamas collaboration never happened. By 1997, Wilson and Paley were still recording, but unable to find a record contract. "I don't blame anybody for having their doubts about Brian," said Paley, "Because you look at what's been out there and it doesn't tell you what he's capable of. The Beach Boys' country album? Come on."

Many of the people advising Brian on his career decisions had been persuading him to break into the adult contemporary and adult album alternative markets. Asked why Wilson did not finish the songs on his own, given that there was so much excitement and enthusiasm over the project, Paley responded: "A lot of people didn't want it to happen. I can't really go into it." Request wrote that Brian was being pressured by his "closest associates" to abandon his meticulously crafted arrangements with Paley and record an album more in the style of Kenny G. Some sources attributed the project's demise specifically to Ledbetter's interference. According to the magazine Uncut, "observers" said that Ledbetter "coerced" Wilson toward Joe Thomas and away from Paley. O'Hagan intimated: "Melinda likes [Thomas], and [Brian's] dependent on Melinda. ... I don't think Brian really wanted to work with him — but he had no choice, he was being pulled in that direction. ... He just wants to feel safe and comfortable." Asked why Wilson worked with Thomas and not Paley, an anonymous insider told journalist Paul Lester, "Melinda! Why? Because it [the Paley-Wilson stuff] didn't sound like Garth Brooks! Think about that for a second – she really doesn't get it. She wants it to sound like this schlocky piece of MOR shit."

Brian moved to St. Charles, Illinois, spurred by a new partnership and friendship with Thomas. Carlin writes that the motivation was largely so that Wilson could use Thomas' connections and "slick" production sound to break into the adult contemporary market. In June 1997, music writer Domenic Priore wrote that Sire Records expressed interest in funding the completion of the Paley tapes and putting it out on the label: "A second meeting with [Seymour] Stein took place where Joe Thomas was brought in, and Thomas offered to deliver newly recorded Brian Wilson tapes from his studio (this offer was thankfully rejected)."

== Aftermath and partial releases ==
The material from the sessions became widely bootlegged, with some of the recordings circulating under the name Landylocked. In June 1998, four months after the death of Carl Wilson, Brian released his fourth solo album, Imagination, containing only one song written with Paley: "Where Has Love Been?". The next month, Rolling Stone journalist Jason Fine reported Brian's upcoming work:

Melinda plans to release a live Wilson album and then return to St. Charles in the fall so Brian can record a second album with [Joe] Thomas. Though Wilson seems more eager to finish the material he's done with Andy Paley than to return to St. Charles, Melinda says he's obligated to do another record with Thomas. She calls the Paley–Wilson material "great therapy" but says his vocals are not up to par and believes the production isn't good enough to be released commercially. As is often the case with Brian's career, Brian doesn't seem to be the one calling the shots. "I'd like to stay here in L.A., but we built the studio, so I guess I have to go," he says simply.

In 2013, the Beach Boys' versions of "Soul Searchin'" and "You're Still A Mystery" were released on their box set Made in California. (However, the version of "You're Still A Mystery" released in 2013 does not feature Brian's original lead vocals; the vocal released had been recorded in 1999; an alternate Beach Boys' version of "Soul Searchin'" (featuring some of the Beach Boys' vocals "flown-in" from the Don Was-produced backing track to Brian and Paley's backing track from their original recording) had previously been bootlegged but not officially released.

In 2015, Brian performed "I'm Broke" live in concert for the first time (with Al Jardine and Blondie Chaplin), with Seattle Music Insider describing it as a "bluesy rarity". In 2017, Paley told Rolling Stone: "I believe that all the stuff he [Brian] and I wrote together will see the light of day. I know he loves it and I love it." The article mentioned that most of the recordings remain unreleased "due in part to the legal quagmire that resulted when Wilson extricated himself from his tyrannical therapist, Eugene Landy." That year, "Some Sweet Day" found release as a bonus track on the compilation Playback: The Brian Wilson Anthology.

In July 2021, vintage mixes of five Paley sessions tracks, including "I'm Broke", and a version of "You’re Still A Mystery" with Brian’s original 1995 lead vocals, were released as downloadables on Wilson's official website. Later that year, in November, the Long Promised Road soundtrack was released with "I'm Goin' Home", "It's Not Easy Being Me", "Must Be a Miracle", "Slightly American Music", and a new mix of "I'm Broke".

In July 2025, a month after Brian Wilson’s death, his manager (and co-conservator) Jean Sievers later confirmed a release for the Andy Paley sessions is in the works.

== Critical reception ==
In 1995, Vox's John Mulvey called it "quite simply the most consistent and inspiring music Brian has made for at least 25 years. For any elder statesman of rock, they would be shockingly good. For a man allegedly a gibbering wreck, they're nothing short of revelatory." Retrospectively, The Washington Post called the material "worthy of release". Peter Ames Carlin wrote that the songs "set a new standard for Brian's solo work".

== Officially released tracks ==
Song	Year	Appearance	Orig. record.	Note(s)
"Sweets for My Sweet"	1995	Till the Night Is Gone: A Tribute to Doc Pomus	Yes	
"This Could Be the Night"	1995	For the Love of Harry: Everybody Sings Nilsson	Yes	
"In My Moondreams"	1995	Pulp Surfin'	Yes	
"This Song Wants to Sleep with You Tonight"	1995	"Do It Again" B-side	Yes	
"Where Has Love Been?"	1998	Imagination	No	
"Gettin' In over My Head"	2004	Gettin' In over My Head	No	
"Soul Searchin'"	2004	Gettin' In over My Head	Partial	
"Saturday Morning in the City"	2004	Gettin' In over My Head	Partial	
"Desert Drive"	2004	Gettin' In over My Head	No	
"Soul Searchin'"	2013	Made in California	Yes	
"You're Still a Mystery"	2013	Made in California	Partial	
"Some Sweet Day"	2017	Playback: The Brian Wilson Anthology	Yes	
"Desert Drive"	2021	brianwilson.com	Yes	
"Gettin' In over My Head"	2021	brianwilson.com	Yes	
"I'm Broke"	2021	brianwilson.com	Yes	
"Saturday Morning in the City"	2021	brianwilson.com	Yes	
"You're Still a Mystery"	2021	brianwilson.com	Yes	
"I'm Goin' Home"	2021	Long Promised Road (Original Motion Picture Soundtrack)	Yes	
"It's Not Easy Being Me"	2021	Long Promised Road (Original Motion Picture Soundtrack)	Yes	
"Must Be a Miracle"	2021	Long Promised Road (Original Motion Picture Soundtrack)	No	
"Slightly American Music"	2021	Long Promised Road (Original Motion Picture Soundtrack)	Yes	
"I'm Broke"	2021	Long Promised Road (Original Motion Picture Soundtrack)	Yes	

== Personnel ==
Partial credits.

- Brian Wilson - vocals, producer, vocal track producer, piano on "Some Sweet Day" and "This Could Be the Night", plastic bells on "Saturday Morning in the City"
- Andy Paley - producer, Steinway grand piano and 6-string bass on "You're Still A Mystery"; backing vocals, drums, guitar, and piano on "Some Sweet Day"; drums and plastic bells on "Saturday Morning in the City"; guitar, drums and glockenspiel on "This Could Be the Night"; all other instruments on "Soul Searchin'"; backing vocals on "Dancin' the Night Away"
- Danny Hutton - vocals on "This Song Wants to Sleep With You Tonight"
- Elliot Easton - guitar on "Elbow '63"
- Mike Love - bass vocals on "Soul Searchin'", backing vocals on "You're Still A Mystery" and "Dancin' the Night Away"
- Carl Wilson - lead vocals on "Soul Searchin'", backing vocals on "You're Still A Mystery", vocals on "Dancin' the Night Away"
- Al Jardine - backing vocals on "Soul Searchin'" and "You're Still A Mystery"
- Bruce Johnston - backing vocals on "Soul Searchin'"
- Matt Jardine - backing vocals on "Soul Searchin'" and "You're Still A Mystery"
- Jonathan Paley - bass guitar on "This Could Be the Night", "Some Sweet Day", and "I'm Broke"; backing vocals on "Some Sweet Day" and "I'm Broke"; plastic bells on "Saturday Morning in the City"
- Michael Andreas - woodwinds on "Some Sweet Day", saxophones on "Soul Searchin'"
- Tommy Morgan - bass harmonica on "This Could Be the Night"
- Benmont Tench - electric piano on "You're Still A Mystery"
- Waddy Wachtel - guitar on "You're Still A Mystery"
- Jim Keltner - drums on "You're Still A Mystery"
- Frank Macchia - saxophones and flutes on "Chain Reaction of Love"
- Don Was - producer
- Mark Linett - engineer

== See also ==
- The Beach Boys bootleg recordings

== Bibliography ==
- Carlin, Peter Ames (2006). Catch a Wave: The Rise, Fall, and Redemption of the Beach Boys' Brian Wilson. Rodale. ISBN 978-1-59486-320-2.
- Dillon, Mark (2012). Fifty Sides of the Beach Boys: The Songs That Tell Their Story. ECW Press. ISBN 978-1-77041-071-8.
- Lambert, Philip (2007). Inside the Music of Brian Wilson: the Songs, Sounds, and Influences of the Beach Boys' Founding Genius. Continuum. ISBN 978-0-8264-1876-0.
- Love, Mike (2016). Good Vibrations: My Life as a Beach Boy. Penguin Publishing Group. ISBN 978-0-698-40886-9.
- Wilson, Brian; Greenman, Ben (2016). I Am Brian Wilson: A Memoir. Da Capo Press. ISBN 978-0-306-82307-7.
