= Brian Wilson Presents Smile =

2004 studio album

Studio album by Brian Wilson
- Released: September 28, 2004
- Recorded: April 13 – July 2004
- Studios: Sunset Sound Recorders and Your Place or Mine Recording, California
- Genres: Orchestral pop; art pop; psychedelic pop; Americana; indie rock
- Length: 46:49
- Label: Nonesuch
- Producer: Brian Wilson

Brian Wilson chronology
Gettin' In over My Head (2004)	Brian Wilson Presents Smile (2004)	What I Really Want for Christmas (2005)

Singles from Brian Wilson Presents Smile
- 1. "Good Vibrations"/"In Blue Hawaii Instrumental" Released: 2004; 2. "Wonderful"/"Wind Chimes" Released: September 20, 2004

Brian Wilson Presents Smile (also referred to as Smile or the abbreviation BWPS) is the fifth studio album by American musician Brian Wilson, released on September 28, 2004 by Nonesuch. It features all-new recordings of music that he had originally created for Smile, an unfinished concept album he produced for the Beach Boys and abandoned in 1967. Revisiting the project was an intense emotional undertaking for Wilson, who had long associated it with trauma and personal failure.

Wilson initially agreed to revisit Smile in the form of a live concert performance, commissioned by the Royal Festival Hall in London, as a follow-up to his 2000–2002 tour for the Beach Boys' album Pet Sounds. From October to November 2003, he worked with keyboardist Darian Sahanaja and original lyricist Van Dyke Parks in assembling a three-movement structure embellished with newly written lyrics, melodies, and orchestrations. The concert premiered on February 20, 2004 with five repeated sold-out showings. Encouraged by the positive reception, Wilson produced its studio-recorded adaptation and embarked on a world tour lasting from late 2004 to mid-2005. His former Beach Boys bandmates were not involved with BWPS, nor with the Showtime documentary that accompanied its release, Beautiful Dreamer: Brian Wilson and the Story of Smile, directed by biographer David Leaf.

BWPS was universally acclaimed by critics and peaked at number 13 in the U.S. and number 7 in the UK. It earned Wilson his first Grammy Award, winning in the category of Best Rock Instrumental Performance for "Mrs. O'Leary's Cow". The album also garnered a nomination for best engineering for Mark Linett who recorded and mixed the project. In 2011, the album's sequencing served as a blueprint for The Smile Sessions, a compilation dedicated to the original Beach Boys recordings, with Wilson and Linett among the co-producers. In 2020, BWPS was ranked number 399 on Rolling Stone's list of "The 500 Greatest Albums of All Time". As of 2025, it is the third-highest rated album on Metacritic.

== Background ==
Brian Wilson abandoned Smile in mid-1967 amid difficulties during its production with the Beach Boys and lyricist Van Dyke Parks. The band substituted its release with Smiley Smile, a downscaled version, and a legend subsequently grew around the original project. During the 1980s, unreleased material from its recording sessions circulated on bootlegs, leading many fans to compile a hypothetical version of the completed album. Among these fans were Los Angeles musicians Darian Sahanaja, Probyn Gregory, and Nick Walusko, later members of the band Wondermints and contributors to journalist Domenic Priore's Smile-focused fanzine, The Dumb Angel Gazette.

In 1995, Wilson reteamed with Parks for the collaborative album Orange Crate Art, provoking speculation of an imminent Smile release, however, Wilson indicated a greater interest in completing a then-forthcoming collaboration with musician Andy Paley. That year, Paley invited Wilson to a concert at the Morgan-Wixon Theater in Los Angeles, a show which featured the Wondermints performing "Surf's Up". After the concert, Wilson remarked to Paley, "If I'd had these guys back in '67, I could've taken Smile on the road." In late 1998, the Wondermints, at the invitation of Wilson's wife and then-manager Melinda Ledbetter, joined his newly formed touring band, a group that included guitarist Jeffrey Foskett, multi-instrumentalist Scott Bennett, reed player Paul Mertens, bassist Bob Lizik, and backing vocalist Taylor Mills. A successful initial tour was followed with concert performances of the full Pet Sounds album from 2000 to 2002; for shows with a symphonic orchestra, Parks was commissioned to write an orchestral arrangement of Wilson's songs as an opener.

Wilson had long been psychologically scarred by the Smile sessions and associated the album with personal failure. Sahanaja recalled, "When I first met Brian, you couldn't even mention the words 'Heroes and Villains'; he'd turn around and walk away or he'd say, 'I don't want to talk about it.'" In 2000, while at a private Christmas gathering at Bennett's house, a request from the wife of biographer and filmmaker David Leaf prompted Wilson to play the song on piano, to the astonishment of everybody present. Sahanaja later said, "If you had even mentioned it to him a month earlier, he would have freaked." Wilson subsequently agreed to perform the song at a forthcoming tribute show held in his honor at the Radio City Music Hall in New York. At that event, various artists performed his songs, including "Our Prayer" and "Surf's Up", with his band providing accompaniment. A performance of "Cabinessence" was considered but abandoned due to its complexity. Following the concert, Ledbetter and Sahanaja successfully petitioned Wilson to add "Our Prayer" and "Surf's Up" into his regular setlists. "Heroes and Villains" and a medley of "Wonderful" and "Cabinessence" were also added. Within a few months, he performed "Our Prayer" and "Heroes and Villains" during an appearance on Late Night with Conan O'Brien.

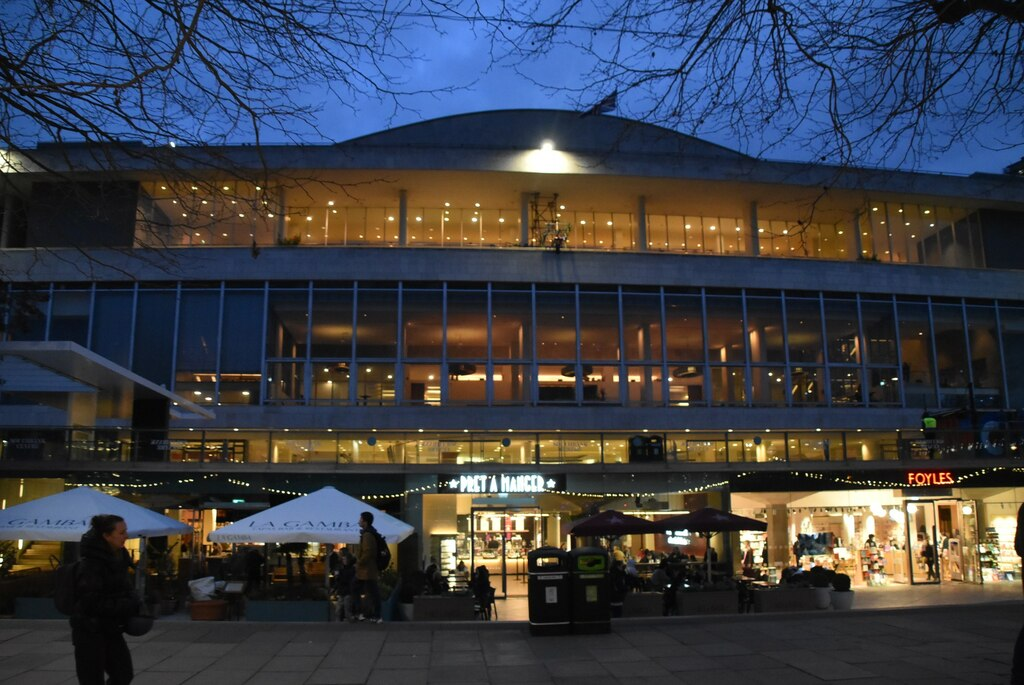
The Smile performances were commissioned by organizers for the Royal Festival Hall in London (pictured in 2023), which had previously hosted Wilson's Pet Sounds shows

During rehearsals for the Pet Sounds concerts in January 2002, Wilson met with Sahanaja, Ledbetter, and concert promoter Glenn Max. There, Max discussed with the band what could logically follow, concluding that performing Smile was the only way to top the success of Pet Sounds. The idea of performing material from Smile was raised without Wilson objecting, and the Royal Festival Hall, through its programming mandate and budget, ultimately commissioned the project. In 2003, during the recording of his forthcoming album Gettin' in over My Head, Wilson permitted his managers, Ronnie Lippin and Jean Sievers, to schedule shows that would include the live debut of Smile. On May 22, while in London to accept an Ivor Novello Award for Lifetime Achievement, it was announced that Wilson and his band would perform a live interpretation of Smile in February 2004 at the Royal Festival Hall. Parks, who had attended the Radio City Music Hall concert, was not originally contacted about the planned concerts and learned of them through the press. (Note: Wilson had paid Parks and his wife's travel expenses for attending the Radio City Music Hall show and singled them out for an ovation, but did not invite them to an exclusive after-party held at a midtown restaurant with other celebrities.)

The announcement generated mixed reactions from some fans concerned that Wilson's attempt to complete Smile would diminish its legacy, a sentiment Sahanaja initially shared. He remembered that during their meetings over the summer, Wilson did not appear interested in the project, although he gradually became more engaged. That same period, Wilson told Leaf that he could not proceed with the Smile concerts without Leaf's continuous presence. Leaf, who had recently completed a film about the Bee Gees, proposed that his daily involvement would only be possible if they were making a documentary film, a condition Wilson accepted.

== Collaboration and assembly ==
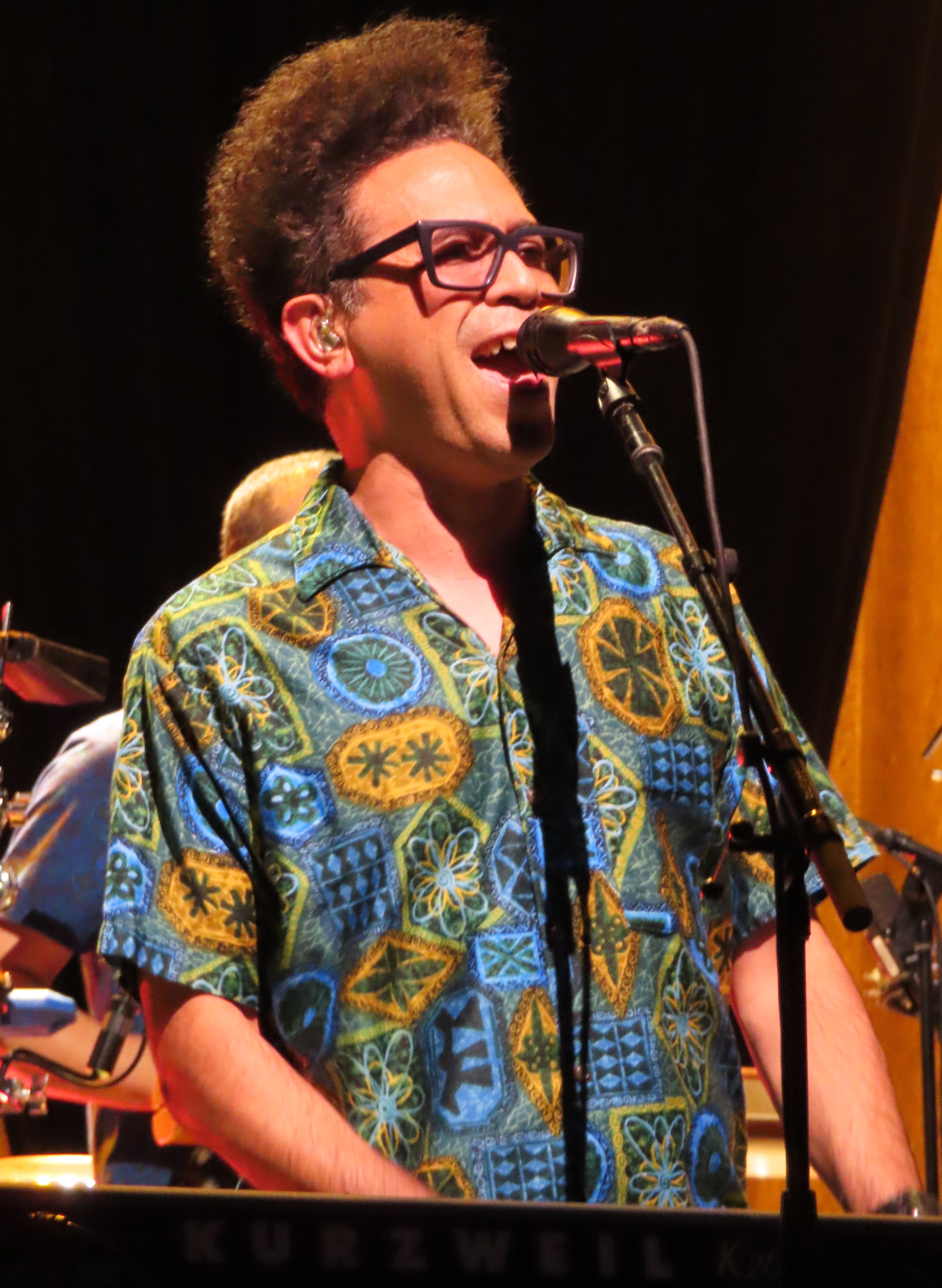
Keyboardist Darian Sahanaja was integral to the project's realization

The project was not initially approached as a completion of the original Smile album, but rather as an effort to compile previously released material into a coherent live performance. To facilitate this, Sahanaja assumed the role of Wilson's "musical secretary" and, in late 2003, transferred selected recordings from the Beach Boys' tape vaults to a laptop computer. (Note: Journalist Scott Staton states that Wilson "probably wouldn't have completed" the project had engineer Mark Linett not already prepared preliminary mixes of Smile tracks for an aborted release from the late 1980s.) His preparatory work also involved consulting bootleg recordings he had collected since the early 1980s, as well as an archive of literature belonging to Leaf, which included photocopies of handwritten lyric sheets that were originally given to illustrator Frank Holmes in 1966.

Using Pro Tools session files loaded onto his Apple G3 iBook, Sahanaja subsequently joined Wilson at his home to review the recordings and determine their original intended structure. Sahanaja undertook the task of transcribing and deconstructing the music, presenting his reconstructions to Wilson for feedback and revision. This process began with the isolation of recurring musical motifs and chord progressions before progressing to lyrical content. Wilson had resisted listening to the original recordings and later said that they had "reawakened the bad feelings of the drugs, not the music. The music was good vibes. The drugs were bad vibes. I had a bad flashback, but we got over it right away."

Early in these sessions, the pair were working on "Do You Like Worms?" when they ran into issues reading the handwriting of its lyric sheet. Wilson swiftly phoned Parks, who he had not spoken to in years, and immediately asked what word came after "cheering". Parks requested a lyric sheet to be faxed, and within minutes, called back and clarified that the word was "Indians". After Wilson and Sahanaja finished their work for that day, Wilson called Parks again and had a lengthier conversation, during which Parks accepted the invitation to join the project.

I said to Van Dyke, "It's really important to me that yours and Brian's work maintains some integrity," and he said, "Thank you." It dawned on me later just how heavy a trip this was, and that's why every little step, every little accomplishment that we made along the way, was so important, in the sense that it was done with integrity and stayed purely those guys' decisions.

— Darian Sahanaja

Parks assumed his original role, providing lyrics that had been written in the 1960s but not previously documented, and some that were newly written for the project, though he was not involved with track sequencing, preferring to leave those decisions to Wilson. In the interest of preserving the "integrity" of their work, Sahanaja took on a less active role, contributing to the discussions only when the songwriters were struggling with "how to pull something off live". (Note: Sahanaja filmed some of the planning sessions for future reference; some of the footage was later used for Beautiful Dreamer.)

=== Original Smile differences ===
Wilson stated that he could recall little of Smile until Parks entered the project, while Parks himself had not listened to the original recordings in decades. According to Wilson, BWPS reimagined the original Smile concept "from scratch" and became "different, much different. Much more progressive, much happier, much more uplifting." Parks believed that a hypothetical 1967 version of Smile would not have significantly diverged from their 2004 arrangement, and when asked by Sahanaja if an idea was part of the original concept, would only respond with, "It was inevitable." Sahanaja recounted two exceptions in which Wilson clearly recalled ideas that he had originally conceived for the album: one was the verse melody of "Do You Like Worms?"; the other was the pairing of "Wonderful" and "Look". Regarding the latter, Sahanaja said that "Brian just butted those two together and said, 'Yeah, that's it! That's how it goes!'" (Note: In Sahanaja's recollection, "He'd be saying, 'Oh yeah, that's supposed to be a part of this song,' or 'Use that bit to connect these two songs here,' and it was really neat." However, on another occasion, Sahanaja said that Wilson did not assert his original ideas for the album: "Brian Wilson is not going to tell you in October/November of 2003, 'No, this was supposed to be like this.' [...] as he became more comfortable, we just went with his gut. And nine times out of ten, his gut is Smile.") Elaborating on Wilson and Parks' communication during the writing sessions, Sahanaja said:

Brian would sing a melody, and I wouldn't know if it was new or something that had always been there. Van Dyke would listen, look up, and then point up in the air and nod his head, like confirmation of some thread he'd left behind. [...] For them to come up with ideas now, whether they were there all along or if they were new, it was seamless to me. They created their own universe.

A number of short, orchestral segues between songs were newly written for the project by Wilson, Parks, Sahanaja, and Paul Mertens; they also wrote a string arrangement for the second part of "Surf's Up", an idea Wilson stated was originally intended for the piece. According to Mertens, some orchestral parts were transcribed from existing recordings, while others were newly added; he recalled instances where he proposed ideas not present on the original recordings with Wilson's approval. Some song titles were changed; "Do You Like Worms?" was renamed "Roll Plymouth Rock", an alteration Wilson attributed to a desire for "something a little more appropriate". When presented with "Mrs. O'Leary's Cow", he hummed the melody from the Smiley Smile track "Fall Breaks and Back to Winter", which was then incorporated into the composition.

Wilson, Parks, and Sahanaja ultimately configured the presentation into three movements. In Wilson's words, "We [first] thought of it as 2-movement rock opera. Then we added a third ..."." The third movement effectively constituted songs that were leftover from the other two, and in Sahanaja's description, "the stuff that was the riskiest" from Wilson's point of view. Sahanaja added: "At that point, he and Van Dyke were talking as if they were finishing Smile." The subtitles for these movements ("Americana", "Cycle of Life", and "Spiritual Rebirth—Elements") were the invention of music writer Peter Reum. In a 2011 interview, Sahanaja stated that Wilson never mentioned an "elemental" concept during these sessions: "whenever I did bring up the concept he didn't seem to react to it with any enthusiasm. I brought it up again while Van Dyke was around and didn't get a clear reaction from him either." According to biographer Steven Gaines, Wilson had declared an intention to complete Smile in three movements in 1980.

Besides the tracks that made it into the final presentation, nothing from the original Smile sessions was worked on, although some recordings were presented to Wilson for consideration. Among the rejected ideas that Sahanaja played for Wilson was "He Gives Speeches", "With Me Tonight", "She's Goin' Bald", and the alternate "rock with me, Henry" version of "Wonderful".

== Rehearsals ==
It was obvious that [Brian] was having some memories, and they weren't necessarily the best memories, when we started to rehearse Smile. I think that [going through with the performances] absolutely did exorcise those problems. It was therapeutic, even for me to watch.

— Guitarist Jeffrey Foskett

Rehearsals began in January 2004, at which point Leaf had arrived with a film crew set on documenting the project. Wilson was still intensely troubled by his memories of Smile and the prospects of performing it live. He began struggling with a resurgence of auditory hallucinations. Sahanaja recalled that, after the holiday break, when he returned to Wilson's house to prepare for the forthcoming vocal rehearsals, "I remember him shaking and he sat down and he started crying and yelling 'I'm fucked! I'm fucked!'" They attempted to work on a few songs before Wilson threw the lyric sheet across the room and began shouting from the other room, "Darian! Darian! They are trying to kill me! They are trying to kill me!" (Note: Sahanaja said, "I found out later that that incident was part of his seasonal depression, especially now that he is the last Wilson [of his generation] standing. His mom, dad, brothers are all gone. There was that and then there was the reality that we had to do SMiLE for real. There was a concert date set and we have to do this.")

On the first day of rehearsals, Wilson had a panic attack and drove himself to the emergency room at a nearby hospital, but calmed down within hours. His attendance for the rest of the rehearsal dates remained inconsistent, as he would leave prematurely on some days, and on others, skip them entirely. Sahanaja told biographer Mark Dillon, "There's always the question of whether you're forcing Brian to do something he doesn't want to do. But in the end, do you want a Brian Wilson who just sits at home, watching TV, or should you try to put a spark under him and get him going to the point where it is a productive, positive thing for him?"

== Initial concerts and reactions ==
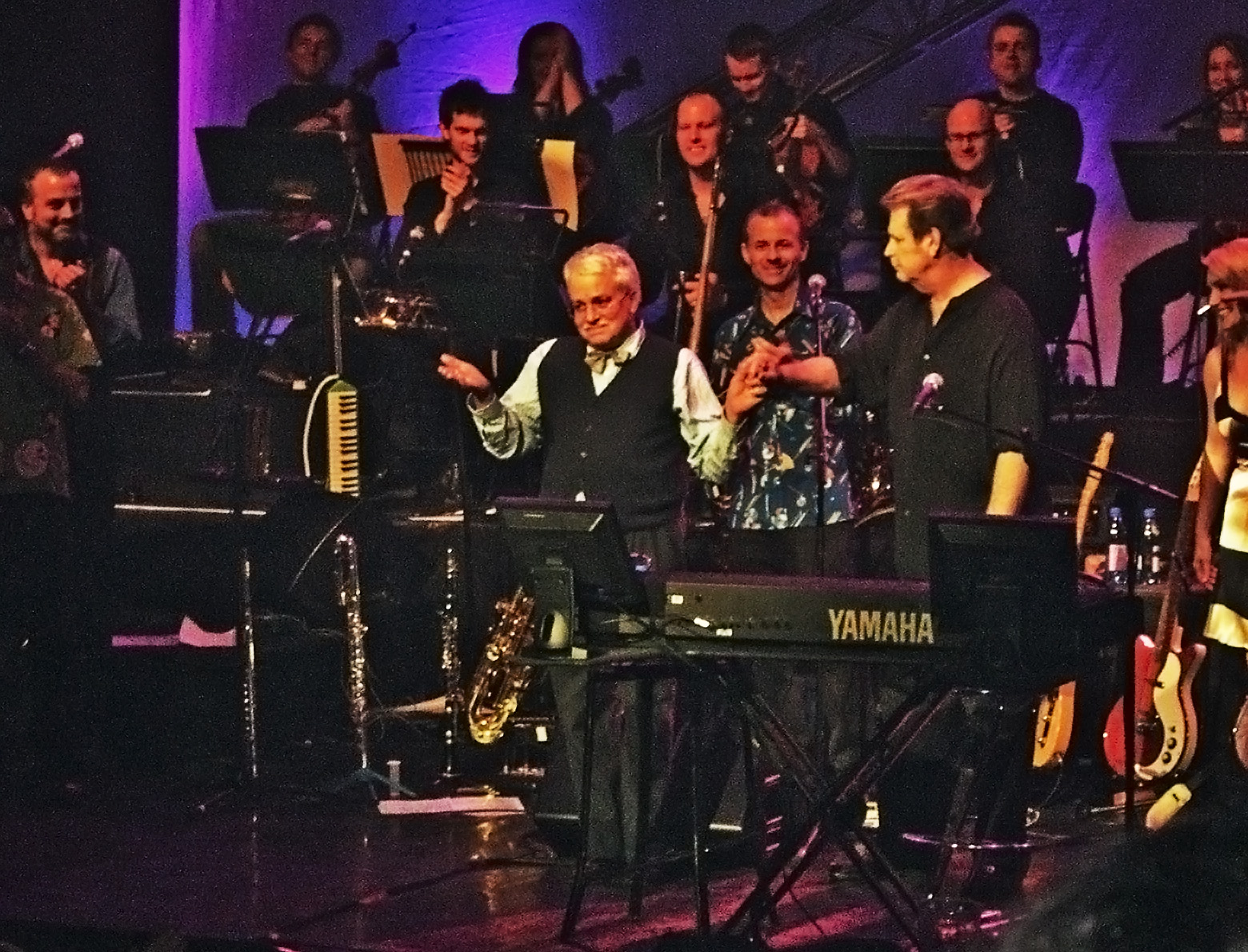
Parks joining Wilson onstage after debuting Smile at the Royal Festival Hall, February 20, 2004

Brian Wilson Presents Smile premiered at the Royal Festival Hall on February 20, 2004. It was bookended by two setlists consisting of regular Beach Boys hits such as "Sloop John B" and "God Only Knows", lesser-known songs such as "You're Welcome" and "Time to Get Alone", and songs from Gettin' in Over My Head. The first set was played acoustically in the style of Beach Boys' Party!; Wilson sat on a stool surrounded by his supporting band, who provided additional vocals, two guitars, bongos, and an occasional flute or harmonica part. Smile followed the intermission.

When Smile completed its debut, Wilson received a ten-minute standing ovation before he was able to invite Parks, who was in tears, onstage. (Note: The ovation was longer on the second night.) According to Sahanaja, "the standing ovation was indescribable. I had never seen anything like it as an audience member or a performer. [...] They wouldn't let him speak or say anything. [...] I stepped up to him and said, 'Uh, Brian... I think they like SMiLE.'" (Note: Wilson later commented on the ten-minute standing ovation, "I got bored after a while. I said, 'Okay, that's enough!' but they wouldn't shut up. It's almost scary [...] I couldn't believe they could like it so much.") During the encore, Parks performed shaker on "Do It Again". Sahanaja reported that, after the show, Wilson rocked back and forth backstage—out of relief that he had finally conquered his fear of Smile—exclaiming "Darian! Darian! We did it! We did it!"

The concerts were repeated at the same venue for six shows until February 27, with each playing recorded by engineer Mark Linett for posterity on a 48-track Genex hard disk recorder. All dates were sold-out. Attendees included Paul McCartney, George Martin, Richard Wright, Jeff Beck, Elvis Costello, Jason Pierce of Spiritualized, Gruff Rhys of Super Furry Animals, Kevin Shields of My Bloody Valentine, and Aphex Twin. A brief tour followed in England and Europe.

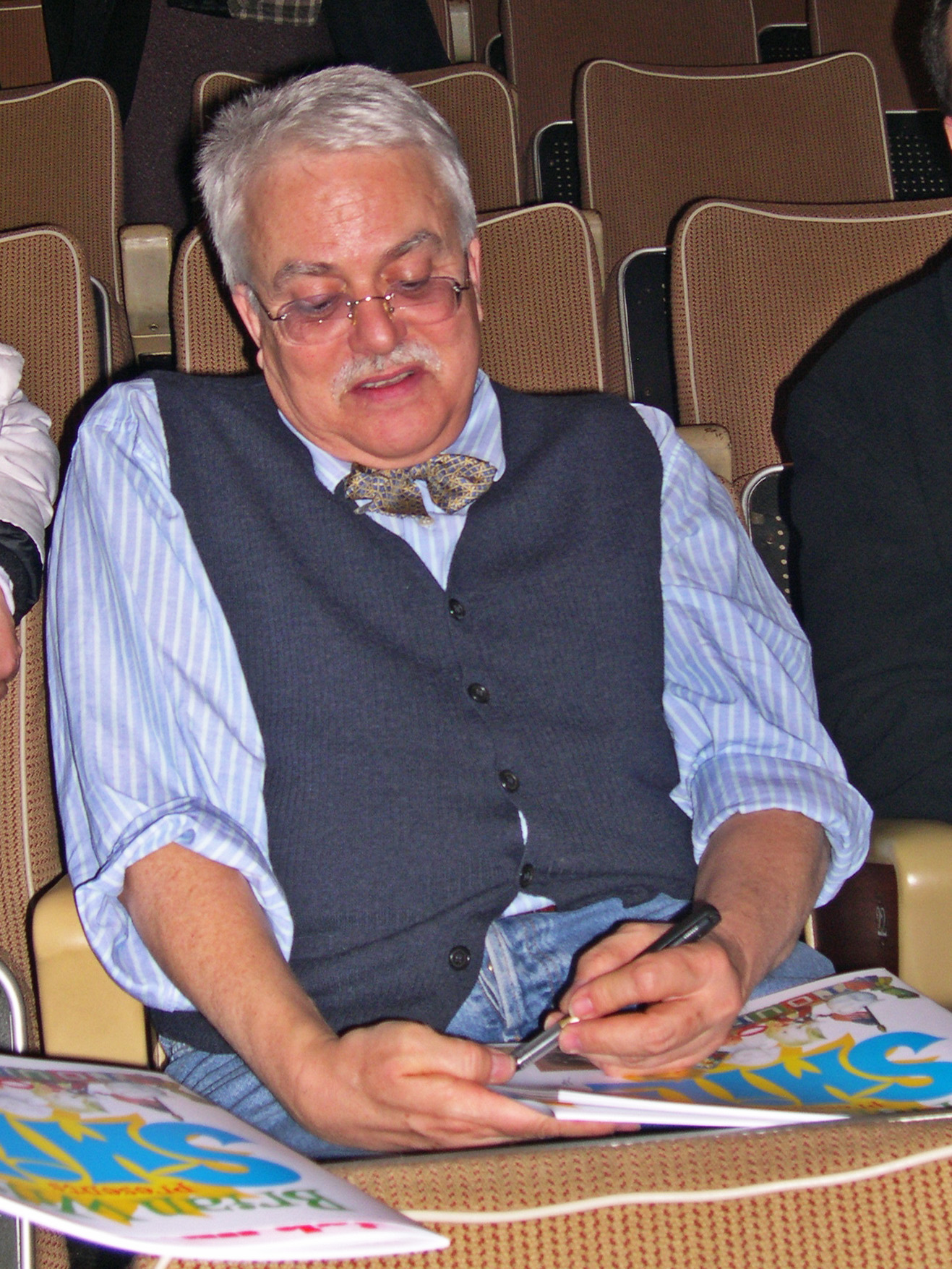
Parks signing Smile memorabilia after the next day's concert

Critical reaction was highly favorable. The Guardian declared that it was "one of the greatest of American symphonies." John Mulvey wrote in NME; "It's rare that you can honestly say you were present at a moment of genuine historic significance. And it's rarer still that the reality of these occasions measures up to the hype." In March, GQ ranked BWPS among the "Top Five Gigs of All Time". Parks attended several more of Wilson's shows, commenting, "It's absolutely thrilling. I did two shows in London, two in New York and two in LA, and you can't help but be engaged in seeing the performance. The audience was very much a part of what the performance was all about."

Conversely, The Times' Stephen Dalton was skeptical of the album's myth and felt that most of the performance "sounded like whimsical juvenilia. It was clearly adventurous for its era but, with the best will in the world, it is not difficult to see why Wilson's [...] fellow Beach Boys balked at releasing it." Mojo's Jim Irvin was similarly underwhelmed; although he enjoyed the songs, he wrote, "To claim that this show was transcendent is to disregard the figure at its heart, a bewildered-looking man of 61 who barely plays the piano he's perched behind. [...] its [sic] hard to feel uplifted, as such." Critic Barney Hoskyns wrote that it was "a pretty magnificent evening", although Wilson's apathetic demeanor resembled that of an autistic person's. Hoskyns mused, "As bizarrely not-there as Brian seemed through all of this, he seemed to be enjoying himself as much as he is able to. Occasionally he flapped his arms about, and he made a big point of introducing 'Marcella' as a real 'rock'n'roll' song – as though that were what we secretly craved."

== Studio recording ==
Motivated by the positive reception, Wilson agreed to record a studio version of Smile after two weeks of consideration. Recording began on April 13, 2004 with his ten-piece touring band, augmented by a ten-piece string section and an acoustic bassist. The basic tracks were recorded at Sunset Sound Recorders in four days, with vocals, additional overdubbing and mixing done at engineer Mark Linett's Your Place or Mine studio.

When played live, digital keyboards were used to replicate the sound of various instruments such as harpsichord and tack piano, and electric drums were used in place of timpanis. These digital keyboards were kept for the album's recording, though a real upright piano and timpani was used. Some alterations were also made to tracks' specific arrangements, since they had been arranged with an audience in mind, along with the logistics of only having ten performers on stage. Linett explained: "For the studio version of Smile, Brian and the band eliminated some of the flourishes that were designed just for live performance and substantially reworked the instrumental arrangements." Most engineering for the album followed practices that were common during the 1960s, and tracks were recorded and sequenced in discrete sections the same as they would have been on the original Smile. The vocals were recorded using a Universal Audio tube mixing console identical to the one used by the Beach Boys at United Western Recorders in the 1960s.

The album was recorded onto a custom Pro Tools HD rig. Mixing was completed in late July, just as the band were to begin their tour of Europe. Wilson mostly avoided the mixing sessions. Linett said, "Brian would come in, make comments, take stuff home, then make more comments. The third time he came in, I gave him a CD and I said: 'Hey, there it is. Smile, ready to play on your CD player.' I swear you could see something change in him. And he's been different ever since." According to Sahanaja, Wilson held the CD to his chest and said, "'I'm going to hold this dear to my heart.' He was trembling."

== Release ==
In an interview from October 2004, Wilson was asked what completing Smile had meant to him, and he responded:

It means reaching people in a market that's so dead, so out of it. Breathing some new life into an old market is what this music is about. And I think it's going to inspire the industry to make better music. I really do. A Phil Spector type of movement might happen again, too. [...] I think we're at the lowest point we've been in the history of the business. The quality of music, the lack of melodic originality, the lack of discernible lyrics, like in rap music. It all adds up to one big minus.

On September 28, 2004, BWPS was issued on Nonesuch Records. It debuted at number 13 on the Billboard 200, the highest chart position of any album by the Beach Boys or Brian Wilson since 1976's 15 Big Ones, and it was the best-selling album on Amazon for two weeks. On September 28, Wilson appeared on The Tonight Show performing "Heroes and Villains". On October 5, Leaf's documentary Beautiful Dreamer: Brian Wilson and the Story of Smile premiered on the Showtime network. The film included interviews with Wilson and dozens of his associates, albeit none of his surviving bandmates from the Beach Boys, who declined to appear in the film. It was later included on the DVD of a Smile concert performed in Los Angeles. By February 2005, Nielson Soundscan had reported that the album had sold over 300,000 copies. It was certified platinum in combination with its international sales.

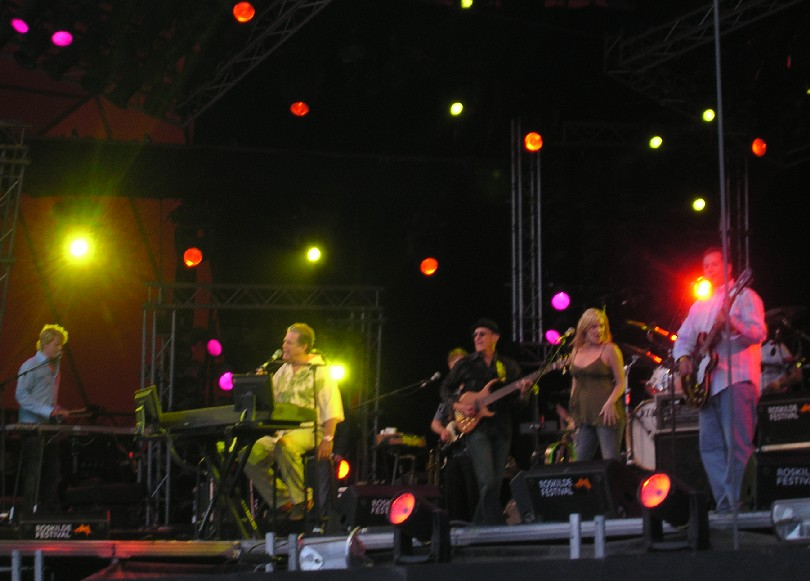
Wilson touring Smile in Denmark, July 2005

From autumn 2004 to summer 2005, Wilson supported the album with a world tour that included stops in the US, Europe, Australia, New Zealand and Japan. In March 2005, Wilson, Parks, and Leaf held a panel at the annual South by Southwest convention in Austin, Texas to discuss Smile. Asked if he would permit the release of the original Beach Boys recordings, Wilson responded, "Never. Those are gone forever. I don't want those made public because they bring up bad memories. I don't think about the old days anymore. I never do." Sahanaja told Australian Musician, "In six years of touring this is the happiest we've ever seen Brian, I mean consistently happy and it's got to be because of the music. [...] Who would have thought … of all things…Smile."

== Contemporary critical reception ==
Professional ratings
Aggregate scores
Source	Rating
Metacritic	97/100
Review scores
Source	Rating
AllMusic	4.5/5 stars
Entertainment Weekly	A
The Guardian	4/5 stars
NME	9/10
The Observer	5/5 stars
Pitchfork	9.0/10
Q	4/5 stars
Rolling Stone	5/5 stars
Uncut	5/5 stars
The Village Voice	A+

BWPS received widespread acclaim from music critics. At Metacritic, which assigns a normalized rating out of 100 to reviews from critics, Smile received an average score of 97 based on 29 reviews, making it the third-highest rated album in the website's history.

Rolling Stone's Robert Christgau, who was skeptical of Smile back in the 1960s, praised Parks' lyrics and wrote, "what elevates them into something approaching a utopian vision is Wilson's orchestrations: brief bridge melodies, youthful harmonies [...] and an enthralling profusion of instrumental colors." (Note: He went on to give the album his rare A+ grade. It also topped his annual list of the year's best album.) Dominique Leone of Pitchfork declared, "As the mythical follow-up to Pet Sounds, it delivers, and despite his age, Wilson's voice even sounds fantastic, still carrying the weight of these angelic melodies." The Village Voice's Tom Smucker felt that it might go on to be considered "album of the year" and described it as "the first successfully conceptualized Beach Boys release since Kokomo, the most moving since Pet Sounds, and the funniest since Smiley Smile".

John Bush of AllMusic believed BWPS was "a remarkably unified, irresistible piece of pop music", yet decreed that it was "no musical watershed on par with Sgt. Pepper's [...] or Wilson's masterpiece, Pet Sounds". Writing in his 2005 book about Smile, Domenic Priore opined, "The recording sessions for the album at Sunset Sound came and went very quickly, and the mix suffers because of this; the emphasis on bass is not what it should be, and the tracks should breathe more. Some felt that there was too much singing, compared with the instrumental texture of the original tapes."

BWPS received three nominations for the 2005 Grammy Awards, including Best Pop Vocal Album and Best Engineered Album, Non-Classical (for Mark Linett). It won one Grammy, in the category of Best Rock Instrumental Performance for "Mrs. O'Leary's Cow". Smile also finished in second place in the Pazz & Jop, an annual critics poll run by The Village Voice. Pitchfork named it fifth best album of 2004 and the 25th best album released between 2000 and 2004.

=== British reception ===
According to Guardian contributor Alexis Petridis, news of the album's release caused "an outbreak of mild hysteria" and provoked a journalist from the newspaper to solicit an opinion from the British government, who then supplied a comment from defense secretary Geoff Hoon. Other celebrities and industry figures were also solicited for their opinions on BWPS; appreciation for Wilson's new work was expressed by singer-songwriter Ed Harcourt, the Who's Roger Daltrey, disc jockey Mary Anne Hobbs, artist Peter Blake, singer Fran Healy, and Hoon. Petridis concluded, "Despite the hype, it is hard not to be impressed with the new Smile. [...] the songs Wilson wrote for Smile still sound like nothing else rock music has ever produced. Its release may not warrant a quote from the defence secretary, but only the hardest heart would not be gladdened by its contents."

NME's reviewer compared BWPS favorably to Sergei Prokofiev's Lieutenant Kijé ("its interweaved and repeated melodic strands"), Miles Davis' Kind of Blue ("its sheer contemplative beauty"), and the work of George Gershwin and Aaron Copland ("its appropriation of American folk"). In his review for Mojo, Mark Paytress rated BWPS higher than the Beatles' Sgt. Pepper's Lonely Hearts Club Band, as well as any "latter-day art-rock classic, say, Radiohead's OK Computer". Acknowledging the "issues of authenticity that arise out of this 'reconstruction'", he added, "as someone with a small collection of Smile(s) — and thus with one eyebrow sharply raised — I'm amazed how easy it is to believe that this is, perhaps, the genuine Smile."

In the same Guardian feature, tentative or negative remarks were given by music critic Paul Morley, novelist Ian Rankin, and Rough Trade Records founder Geoff Travis." Morley felt that BWPS represented "a breathtaking example of ultimately banal thinkers attempting self-consciously to make art, a square version of freaking out, musically sophisticated, aesthetically conservative [...] I needed a quick shower of Ramones, Dre and Hendrix afterwards, just to rinse away the clingy bits of fake myth."

== Beach Boys' response and lawsuit ==
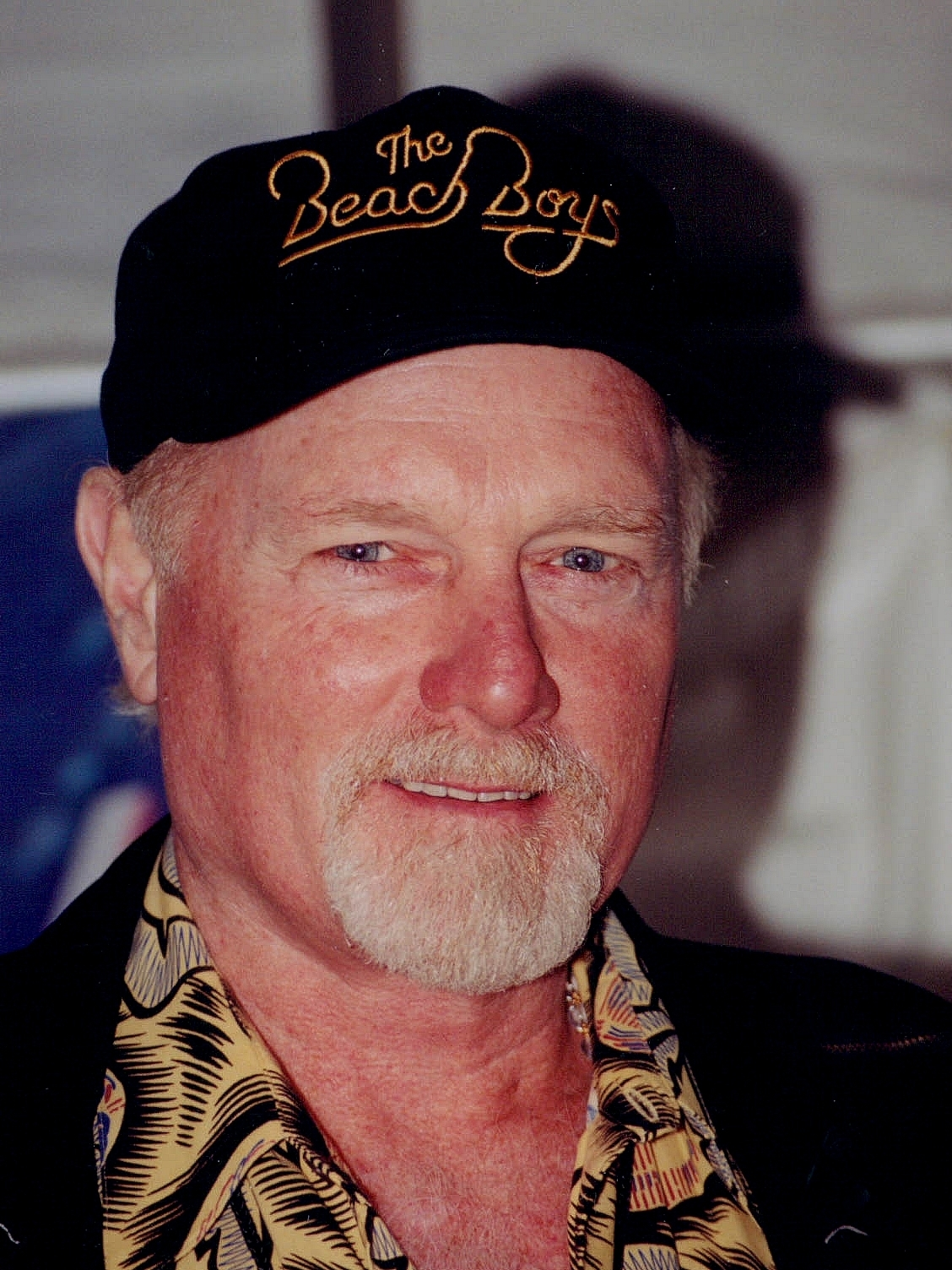
Mike Love felt that the Beach Boys did not receive due credit for the work that led to Wilson's 2004 Smile.

Mike Love gave his thoughts on the album in a November 2004 interview: "I guess it's a good thing for Brian to do. A friend sent me a copy, but I haven't had time to hear it yet because we've been on tour." In an earlier interview, he had said he would have no interest in listening to the album and citing the legal concept of "corporate opportunity", mentioned that it had possibly infringed on the Beach Boys' intellectual property rights. Love argued that, because the group had collectively paid for the 1960s recording sessions and all contributed work on the original tracks, "I would have thought it would have been more honorable to put it together as the Beach Boys."

In many interviews he gave around the album's release, Wilson disparaged the Beach Boys, calling them inferior to his current band. In a 2007 interview, Love expressed that he was disappointed to hear about Wilson's remarks. "I'm glad that he's happy with the people he's performing with, but, you know, I think it's sad that he thinks that. My personal feeling is that the original group recordings on Smile have got to be better." Bruce Johnston took offense as well, writing in an email to biographer Peter Ames Carlin: "I spent years showing full support for Brian, but now that's all changed because of his current point of view." Johnston said of the album in a 2008 interview, "I think as an exercise in keeping [Wilson] occupied, it's interesting. [...] I talk to him every once in a while. But I'm never going to tell him that I'll take Pet Sounds over what he's doing now."

One of the promotions for the album was a free CD issued through the Mail on Sunday in September 2004. The 10-track compilation included Beach Boys songs Wilson had recently rerecorded, five of which he coauthored with Love. The Mail on Sunday distributed 2.6 million copies of the compilation. In November 2005, Love filed a lawsuit in which he claimed the promotion hurt the sales of the original recordings. Love's suit was dismissed in 2007 when a judge determined that there were "no triable issues of material fact".

Al Jardine said in 2013 that he "didn't give it a whole lot of thought; I didn't want to go there at that time. They were good enough to send me a copy. So I dropped the needle, as they used to say, and listened to a few cuts, and it was very nice. But there's nothin' like the [vintage recordings]."

== Retrospective assessments and legacy ==
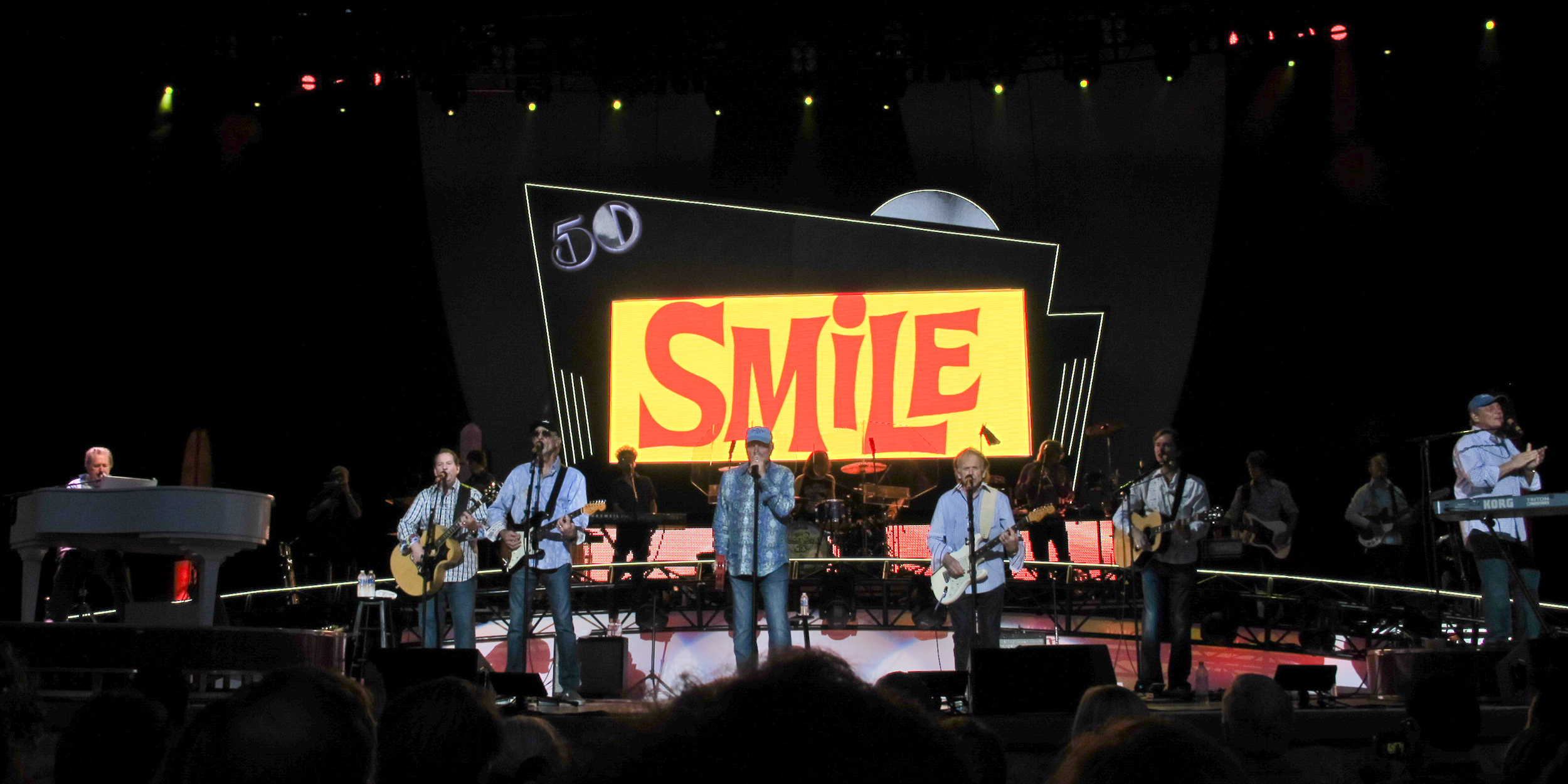
Wilson and members of his band performing "Heroes and Villains" with the Beach Boys in 2012, during their reunion tour

Although critics widely referred to Wilson's 2004 version as the Smile album completed, many fans disputed the notion. Bootleggers continued to compile their own versions of the Beach Boys' album. In 2011, The Smile Sessions was released, containing an approximation of what the band's finished album might have sounded like, using BWPS as a blueprint. Linett co-produced the compilation with Wilson. According to Sahanaja, Wilson "lobbied hard" for the album's sequence to be based on BWPS. In a 2015 interview, Wilson stated that he ultimately preferred his solo version.

Reviewing BWPS on the tenth anniversary of its release, Chris Shields of the St. Cloud Times wrote that "the sequencing raised a question mark or two, and there were mixing quibbles (I would have loved to hear more bass), but [...] [t]he lyrical beauty, the majesty of the music, the shifting (yet somehow fixed) meanings that intertwine throughout it all, still elate me, still fill me with hope and joy." PopMatters contributor Sean Murphy opined that the album was "crucial", but rendered "less significant" with the availability of The Smile Sessions. Writing for NewMusicBox, Frank Oteri called BWPS "a wonderful album, but it is also not quite right. It is not and can never be a substitute for SMiLE". Music historian Clinton Heylin, who felt that the original Smile recordings failed to live up to the myth, characterized BWPS as "a pale shadow full of digital tweaks, and precious little sweet inspiration; showing if anything that there never was a realised record".

In 2009, BWPS was named the 88th best album of the decade by Rolling Stone. (Note: In his ballot for the magazine, Christgau ranked it as the 20th best album of the decade.) In 2010, it was included in the book 1001 Albums You Must Hear Before You Die. In 2020, it was ranked number 399 on Rolling Stone's list of "The 500 Greatest Albums of All Time". The editors wrote, "Close your eyes and you can imagine how it might've changed the world in 1968 [sic], but with Wilson's influence still all over scads of indie bands in 2004, it sounds and feels majestically modern." (Note: In this edition, The Smile Sessions, which had appeared on the list's 2012 revision, was not listed.) In 2022, it was ranked number 102 on Uncut's list of the greatest albums released since 1997, as well as number 21 on Rolling Stone's list of the greatest concept albums in history.

== Track listing ==
All tracks are written by Brian Wilson and Van Dyke Parks, except where noted.

Movement one
No.	Title	Length
1.	"Our Prayer"/"Gee" (Brian Wilson/William Davis, Morris Levy)	2:09
2.	"Heroes and Villains"	4:53
3.	"Roll Plymouth Rock"	3:48
4.	"Barnyard"	0:58
5.	"Old Master Painter"/"You Are My Sunshine" (Haven Gillespie, Beasley Smith)	1:04
6.	"Cabin Essence"	3:27
Total length:		16:17

Movement two
No.	Title	Length
7.	"Wonderful"	2:07
8.	"Song for Children"	2:16
9.	"Child Is Father of the Man"	2:18
10.	"Surf's Up"	4:07
Total length:		10:46

Movement three
No.	Title	Length
11.	"I'm in Great Shape"/"I Wanna Be Around"/"Workshop" (Wilson, Van Dyke Parks, Johnny Mercer, Sadie Vimmerstedt)	1:56
12.	"Vega-Tables"	2:19
13.	"On a Holiday"	2:36
14.	"Wind Chimes"	2:54
15.	"Mrs. O'Leary's Cow" (Wilson)	2:27
16.	"In Blue Hawaii"	3:00
17.	"Good Vibrations" (Wilson, Tony Asher, Michael Love)	4:36
Total length:		19:46 46:49

Instrumental bonus tracks, side four of vinyl release
No.	Title	Length
1.	"Heroes and Villains"	4:47
2.	"Cabin Essence"	3:30
3.	"On a Holiday"	2:28
4.	"Wind Chimes"	2:25
Total length:		13:10 59:59

== Set list ==
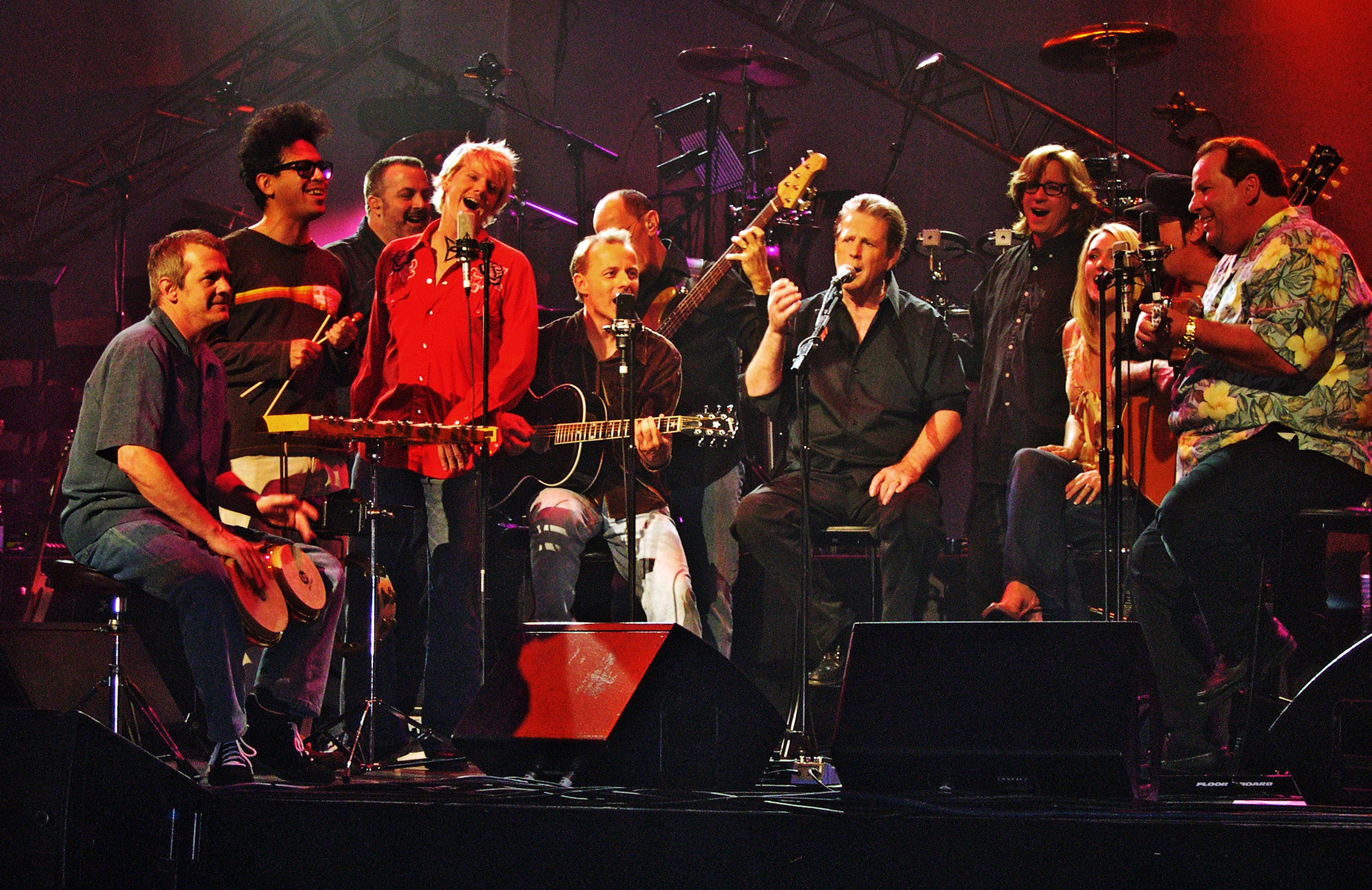
Wilson and his band playing the pre-Smile acoustic set at the Royal Festival Hall, February 21, 2004. From left: Jim Hines, Darian Sahanaja, Paul Mertens, Scott Bennett, Probyn Gregory, Bob Lizik (obscured), Wilson, Nelson Bragg, Taylor Mills, Nick Walusko (obscured), and Jeffrey Foskett.

The songs performed at the Royal Festival Hall shows in February 2004.

First set (acoustic)

1. "And Your Dream Comes True"
2. "Surfer Girl"
3. "In My Room"
4. "Hawaii"
5. "Keep An Eye On Summer"
6. "Please Let Me Wonder"
7. "Good Timin'"
8. "You're Welcome"

First set (full instrumentation)

9. "Time to Get Alone"
10. "Sloop John B"
11. "Row Your Boat"
12. "God Only Knows"
13. "Soul Searchin'"
14. "California Girls"
15. "Catch a Wave"
16. "Dance, Dance, Dance"
17. "City Blues"
18. "Sail On, Sailor"

Smile – same running order as album track list

Encore

37. "Do It Again"
38. "I Get Around"
39. "Help Me Rhonda"
40. "Barbara Ann"
41. "Surfin' U.S.A."
42. "Fun, Fun, Fun"
43. "Love and Mercy"

== Personnel ==
Per the album's liner notes.

The Brian Wilson Band

- Brian Wilson – vocals, keyboards
- Jeffrey Foskett – vocals, guitar, hammer
- Probyn Gregory – vocals, guitar, brass, Tannerin, whistles
- Nelson Bragg – vocals, percussion, whistles, celery
- Bob Lizik – bass guitar, beret
- Scott Bennett – vocals, keyboards, mallets, guitar
- Darian Sahanaja – vocals, keyboards, mallets, drill
- Nick Walusko – vocals, guitar
- Jim Hines – drums, mallets, saw, sound effects
- Paul Mertens – woodwinds, saxophone, harmonica, semi-conductor
- Taylor Mills – vocals, power drill, leg-slap

Stockholm Strings 'n' Horns

- Björn Samuelsson – trombone
- Victor Sand – saxophone, flute, clarinet
- Malin-My Nilsson – violin
- Anna Landberg – cello
- Staffan Findin – bass trombone
- Erik Holm – viola
- Andreas Forsman – violin
- Markus Sandlund – cello

Production and technical staff

- Recorded and mixed by Mark Linett
- Kevin Deane – assistant engineer
- Mark London – package design and art
- Dennis Loren – graphic layouts
- Bob Ludwig – mastering
- Pete Magdaleno – assistant engineer
- Daniel S. McCoy – assistant engineer
- Brian Wilson – arranger, producer

== Charts ==
Weekly album charts
Chart (2004)	Peak position
Australian Albums (ARIA)	17
Austrian Albums (Ö3 Austria)	59
Belgian Albums (Ultratop Flanders)	19
Belgian Albums (Ultratop Wallonia)	72
Canadian Albums (Billboard)	44
Danish Albums (Hitlisten)	18
Dutch Albums (Album Top 100)	21
Finnish Albums (Suomen virallinen lista)	39
French Albums (SNEP)	29
German Albums (Offizielle Top 100)	22
Irish Albums (IRMA)	17
Italian Albums (FIMI)	33
Norwegian Albums (VG-lista)	15
Swedish Albums (Sverigetopplistan)	23
Swiss Albums (Schweizer Hitparade)	54
UK Albums (OCC)	7
US Billboard 200	13

Year-end charts
Chart (2004)	Position
UK Albums (OCC)	171

== Bibliography ==
- Badman, Keith (2004). The Beach Boys: The Definitive Diary of America's Greatest Band, on Stage and in the Studio. Backbeat Books. ISBN 978-0-87930-818-6.
- Carlin, Peter Ames (2006). Catch a Wave: The Rise, Fall, and Redemption of the Beach Boys' Brian Wilson. Rodale. ISBN 978-1-59486-320-2.
- Dillon, Mark (2012). Fifty Sides of the Beach Boys: The Songs That Tell Their Story. ECW Press. ISBN 978-1-77090-198-8.
- Heylin, Clinton (2007). The Act You've Known for All These Years: The Life, and Afterlife, of Sgt. Pepper (1st ed.). Canongate. ISBN 978-1-84195-918-4.
- Flory, Andrew (2016). "Fandom and Ontology in Smile". In Lambert, Philip (ed.). Good Vibrations: Brian Wilson and the Beach Boys in Critical Perspective. University of Michigan Press. ISBN 978-0-472-11995-0.
- Lambert, Philip (2007). Inside the Music of Brian Wilson: the Songs, Sounds, and Influences of the Beach Boys' Founding Genius. Continuum. ISBN 978-0-8264-1876-0.
- Leaf, David (2025). SMiLE: The Rise, Fall, and Resurrection of Brian Wilson. Omnibus Press. ISBN 978-1-915841-31-5.
- Priore, Domenic (2005). Smile: The Story of Brian Wilson's Lost Masterpiece. London: Sanctuary. ISBN 1860746276.
