= Klak Tik =

Musical group

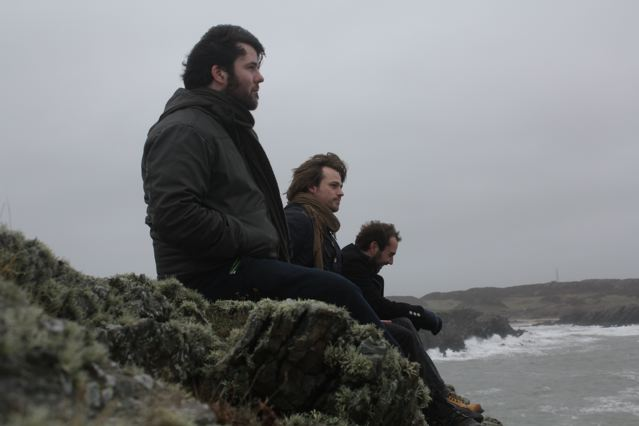

Background information
- Origin: London, Copenhagen
- Genres: Orchestral; Alternative; Folk; Experimental
- Years active: 2008–present
- Label: Safety First Records
- Members: Søren Bonke; Matt Mitchinson; John Beyer
- Website: http://www.myspace.com/klaktik

Klak Tik is one of the musical projects of Danish singer, songwriter and multi-instrumentalist Søren Bonke, now performing as Sorenious Bonk.

The band consists of Bonke, Jonathan Beyer (from Windsor, UK) and Matthew Mitchinson, (from New Zealand). Live, they are joined by a variety of musicians to form an eight piece band.

The musical style of the band is a mixture of alternative, orchestral, experimental, and folk. Klak Tik record their music in their own studio in East London.

== History ==
After leaving his home country Denmark in 2000, Søren came to London and co-founded the band 6 Day Riot with Tamara Schlesinger. He left the band in 2008 to concentrate on other projects. After having worked for a year on new songs, Klak Tik was finally born.

== Discography ==
In 2009 they released the 4 track EP, Biased. Their new album, Must we find a Winner was released on 14 June 2010 on Klak Tik's own Safety First Records. This album was well received and was given a 9/10 from music magazine NME where it was also described as the orchestral folk album of the year. The band also collaborates with other musicians and most recently with the Polly Tones on a 'sequel' to Simon & Garfunkel's Kathy's song.

Klak Tik's 2nd album, 'The Servants' was released in 2012.

== Reviews ==
On 19 November Politiken (Denmark's 2nd biggest national newspaper), published a flattering full page spread about Søren Bonke and Klak Tik.

'9/10 - Download literally any track' (NME)

'The delightfully named Soren Bonke, [...] has released an album for which ‘delightful’ is too faint a signifier of praise' (NME)

'Sometimes beautiful, sometimes haunting, consistently mesmerising.' (Redbricks online)

'brilliant debut radiating with nonconformity, relaxation and musical majesty' (Redbricks Magazine)

'offers the same vulnerable intimacy Sufjan Stevens perfected on Illinoise ***' (Uncut)

== Related projects ==
Søren also composes music for films and commercials under the pseudonym of Sorenious Bonk. Under this name he won the True Award for best music for a Danish Doctors without Borders spot directed by brother Adam Bonke. Most recently he won Best Sound at the British Animation Awards in 2010 for the score on The Black Dog's Progress, directed by Stephen Irwin. The two are collaborating on Irwin's next animation.
