= Markus Sandlund =

Swedish musician (1975–2004)

Erik Markus Sandlund (26 April 1975 – 26 December 2004) was a Swedish cellist.

== Early life and career ==
Sandlund was born in Norrfjärden, Sweden. He began playing cello when he was six years old and studied at the Royal College of Music, Stockholm. He played in several orchestras in Sweden and also played on many studio recordings. He also played with Ray Charles on a tour of Sweden.

Sandlund appears on Nicolai Dunger's Soul Rush (2001), Sofia Pettersson's That's Amore (2004) and Bo Sundström's Den lyckliges väg (2007). Most notably, he played with the Stockholm Strings n' Horns on Brian Wilson's 2004 album Smile, a newly recorded and completed version of the Beach Boys' aborted album of the same title from 1967. He was part of the Brian Wilson Presents Smile touring band, who toured North America, Australia and New Zealand in 2004.

== Disappearance ==
After the Smile tour was finished in December 2004, Sandlund traveled to Khao Lak in Thailand to celebrate Christmas with his girlfriend. The couple were in the pool at the Orchid Beach Resort when the 2004 Indian Ocean earthquake and tsunami hit, sweeping both of them away; while she was later rescued, Sandlund remained missing.

Upon hearing of Sandlund's disappearance, Wilson stated that he was "devastated" by the news, adding, "We have sent an agent to see what we can find out, but as of today (Jan. 4) we have been unable to locate Markus in the area. ... My prayers go out to all of the victims and their families, and I would ask you to say a prayer for Markus' safe return."

=== Death ===
Sandlund's body was found in late May 2005. According to his girlfriend, Sofia Pettersson, Sandlund was buried on June 16 in his hometown of Norrfjärden.

== Legacy ==
On January 15, 2005, Wilson and his band had appeared on the Tsunami Aid: A Concert of Hope telethon and performed Wilson's "Love and Mercy" in honor of Sandlund, who was still missing at that time.

The 2005 home video release of Brian Wilson Presents Smile was dedicated to Sandlund's memory.
