= Overnight Sensational =

Studio album by Sam Moore
- Released: August 29, 2006
- Genre: Soul
- Length: 45:18
- Label: Rhino
- Producer: Randy Jackson

Sam Moore chronology
Plenty Good Lovin': The Lost Solo Album (2002)	Overnight Sensational (2006)

Overnight Sensational is a 2006 album by Sam Moore. This album was produced by Randy Jackson and features artists such as Jon Bon Jovi, Bekka Bramlett, Mariah Carey, Eric Clapton, Nikka Costa, Sheila E., Billy F. Gibbons, Vince Gill, Van Hunt, Billy Preston, Robert Randolph, Paul Rodgers, Bruce Springsteen, Sting, Travis Tritt, BeBe Winans, Steve Winwood, Wynonna, and Zucchero. It was released by Rhino Records.

Professional ratings
Review scores
Source	Rating
AllMusic	2.5/5 stars
Dallas Morning News	C+
The Encyclopedia of Popular Music	3/5 stars
PopMatters	6/10
USA Today	3.5/4 stars

== Track listing ==
1. "I Can't Stand the Rain" with Wynona, Bebe Winans & Billy Preston on organ
2. "Better to Have and Not Need" with Bruce Springsteen
3. "Blame It on the Rain" with Fantasia
4. "Lookin' for a Love" with Jon Bon Jovi
5. "Ain't No Love" with Steve Winwood
6. "None of Us Are Free" with Sting & Sheila E. on percussion
7. "It's Only Make Believe" with Mariah Carey & Vince Gill
8. "Don't Play That Song (You Lied)" with Bekka Bramlett
9. "If I Had No Loot" with Van Hunt, Nikka Costa & ZZ Top's Billy Gibbons on guitar
10. "Ridin' Thumb" with Travis Tritt & Robert Randolph on pedal steel
11. "We Shall Be Free" with Paul Rodgers
12. "You Are So Beautiful" with Billy Preston, Zucchero & Eric Clapton on guitar

== Personnel ==
Musicians

- Sam Moore – vocals
- Tim Akers – clavinet (5), keyboards (6, 10)
- Robert Bacon – guitar (1–5, 7–9, 12)
- Karen Bakunin – viola (12)
- Charles Bisharat – violin (12)
- Michael Bland – drums (1, 4, 10, 12)
- Jon Bon Jovi – vocals (4)
- Bekka Bramlett – vocals (1, 8), background vocals (3–5, 7–9)
- Sherree Ford Brown – background vocals (2, 11, 12)
- Mariah Carey – background vocals (7)
- Susan Chapman – violin (12)
- Eric Clapton – guitar solo (12)
- Vinnie Colaiuta – drums (2, 7, 8, 11)
- Lionel Cole – keyboards (4, 7), Rhodes (10), background vocals (4)
- Larry Corbett – first cello (12)
- Nikki Costa – vocals (9)
- Shana Crooks – background vocals (1, 5, 6, 8, 10)
- Kenneth Crouch – keyboards (1, 3–5, 8, 12), Hammond B3 (7, 10), piano (12)
- Mario DeLeon – violin (12)
- Joel DeRouin – violin and concert master (12)
- Andrew Dickles – viola (12)
- Sheila E. – percussion (6)
- Tabitha Fair – background vocals (1, 2, 5, 6, 8, 10–12)
- Fantasia – vocals (3)
- Mike Finnigan – Hammond B3 (2–4, 6, 8, 9, 11, 12)
- James Gamble – drums (3, 9)
- Armen Garabedian – violin (12)
- Siedah Garrett – background vocals (2–4, 7–9, 11, 12)
- Billy F. Gibbons – guitar (9)
- Sharlotte Gibson – background vocals (2–4, 7–9, 11, 12)
- Vince Gill – background vocals (7)
- Gary Grant – trumpet (5, 8, 10)
- Adie Grey – background vocals (1, 5, 6, 8, 10)
- Jerry Hey – trumpet (5, 8, 10), horn arrangements (5, 8–10)
- Dan Higgins – tenor saxophone (5, 8), baritone saxophone (5, 8, 9), saxophones (10)
- Gerry Hilera – violin (12)
- Van Hunt – vocals (9)
- Randy Jackson – bass (3, 4, 9), background vocals (4)
- Suzie Katayama – string arrangements (12)
- Cornelius Mims – bass (2, 3, 7–9, 11, 12)
- Jay Mitchell – programming (1, 2)
- Dan Needham – drums (5, 6)
- Alyssa Park – violin (12)
- Greg Phillinganes – keyboards (2), clavinet (6, 10), piano (6–8, 10)
- Billy Preston – Hammond B3 (1), piano (12)
- Robert Randolph – pedal steel guitar (10, 12)
- Michelle Richards – violin (12)
- Steve Richards – cello (12)
- Michael Ripoll – guitar (5, 6, 10)
- Paul Rodgers – vocals (11)
- John Shanks – guitar (4)
- Tommy Simms – bass (5, 6, 10)
- Dan Smith – cello (12)
- Bruce Springsteen – vocals and guitar (2)
- Rudy Stein – cello (12)
- David Stenske – viola (12)
- Sting – vocals (6)
- Crystal Talifero – background vocals (6, 10)
- Lloyd "Sunny" Thompson – bass (1, 4)
- Michael Thompson – guitar (2, 3, 5, 7, 8, 11)
- Travis Tritt – vocals (10)
- Josefina Vergara – violin (12)
- Randy Waldman – keyboards (11)
- David T. Walker – guitar (10)
- BeBe Winans – vocals (1)
- Steve Winwood – vocals and Hammond B3 (5)
- Jimmy Woods – mouth harp (2), background vocals (2, 4)
- Wynonna – vocals (1)
- Reggie Young – trombone (5, 8, 10)
- Zucchero – vocals (12)

Technical personnel

- Neil Cappellino – engineer for Vince Gill (7)
- Alan Douglas – engineer for Eric Clapton (12)
- Brian "Big Bass" Gardner – mastering
- Brian Garten – engineer for Mariah Carey (7), digital editing (7)
- Stephanie Gourley – assistant engineer (1, 3–10, 12)
- Keith Gretlein – engineer (4, 12), assistant engineer
- Bernie Grundman – mastering
- Kevin Guarnieri – engineer, mixing (1–4, 5–9, 12), digital editing, engineer for Jon Bon Jovi (4)
- Tony High – assistant engineer (1, 5, 6, 10)
- Randy Jackson – producer
- Jeff Kanan – digital editing
- Mario Luccy – assistant engineer (3)
- Obie O'Brien – engineer for Jon Bon Jovi (4)
- Glenn Pittman – assistant engineer (1, 2, 7, 8)
- Phillip Ramos – assistant engineer (3)
- Mike Rew – engineer for Jon Bon Jovi (4)
- Toby Scott – engineer for Bruce Springsteen (2)
- Matt Serrecchio – assistant engineer (1, 2)
- Jaime Sickora – assistant engineer (8, 10, 11), assistant mix engineer (5, 10), assistant engineer for Mariah Carey (7)
- Jess Sutcliffe – mixing (5, 10, 11)
- James Towler – engineer for Steve Winwood (5)
