= Look (Song for Children) =

Song by The Beach Boys

Song by the Beach Boys

from the album The Smile Sessions
- Released: October 31, 2011
- Recorded: August 12, 1966 – 1971
- Studio: Western and Beach Boys, Los Angeles
- Length: 2:31
- Label: Capitol
- Songwriter: Brian Wilson
- Producer: Brian Wilson

Licensed audio
- "Look (Song for Children)" on YouTube

"Song for Children"

Song by Brian Wilson

from the album Brian Wilson Presents Smile
- Released: September 28, 2004
- Recorded: 2004
- Studio: Sunset Sound, Hollywood
- Length: 2:16
- Label: Nonesuch
- Songwriters: Brian Wilson; Van Dyke Parks
- Producer: Brian Wilson

Licensed audio
- "Song for Children" on YouTube

"Look" (also known as "I Ran" and "Untitled Song #1") is an incomplete musical piece that was composed by American musician Brian Wilson for the Beach Boys' aborted Smile album. Wilson produced the backing track at the start of the Smile sessions in August 1966. It is theorized that a missing session tape may have contained a vocal track that he recorded with his bandmates in October.

In 2004, Wilson rerecorded the track as "Song for Children", with new lyrics written by Van Dyke Parks, for his album Brian Wilson Presents Smile, where it segues between the songs "Wonderful" and "Child Is Father of the Man". The 2011 compilation The Smile Sessions included a version of the original Beach Boys recording with additional vocals sampled from their 1971 song "Surf's Up".

== Background ==
"Look" was one of the earliest pieces recorded during the Smile sessions. Musicologist Philip Lambert speculated that some parts of the music possibly evolved from one of the riffs in "Good Vibrations".

== Recording ==
The instrumental track for "Look" was recorded on August 12, 1966, at Western studio. It was titled "Look" on the tape box, but on the AFM sheet, it was logged as "Untitled Song #1" with a runtime of 2:16. The instrumentation featured upright bass, vibraphones, keyboard, French horn, guitars, organs, trombone and woodwind. Take 20 was marked as best.

Capitol Records documentation suggests that, on October 13, all six Beach Boys were involved in a vocal overdubbing session for the track, now logged as "I Ran (Formerly Untitled Song #1)" with a 3:10 runtime. Writing in The Smile Sessions liner notes, Craig Slowinski said that "a tape from that session has not turned up in a search of the Capitol and BRI vaults."

In November, journalist Tom Nolan wrote about Wilson in The Los Angeles Times West:

He has this great self-taught approach to music, which Barney Kessel calls “kind of a Stone-Age-Man approach,” so that every now and then he will do something that makes these veteran guys snicker behind his back, like saying to the engineer: "That trumpet over there should be a little louder; the one with the – what is that, a mute?" Or someone will point out to him that the four bars which he thought was a traditional vamp is actually from Twelfth Street Rag, which is copyright material. "That’s all right," he’ll say, "I’ll pay for it. You know I don’t steal."

== "Song for Children" ==
Wilson rerecorded "Look" as "Song for Children" for his 2004 version of Smile. According to Darian Sahanaja, during the album's assembly, "I was moving things around in Pro Tools, putting things together to show Brian. I dropped 'Wonderful' next to 'Look', and we listened to it. Brian's eyes lit up, and he said 'That's it! That's how we'll do it!'"

After Van Dyke Parks joined the project, "Look" was renamed to "Song for Children", and Parks provided lyrics to further establish connections with other tracks on the album, especially those within the second movement. The track serves as the link between "Wonderful" and "Child Is Father of the Man", thus being the second track of the album's second movement. In this version, the "Twelfth Street Rag" section is not performed.

== Personnel ==
Per band archivist Craig Slowinski.

The Beach Boys

- Carl Wilson – vocals (sampled from a 1971 recording for The Smile Sessions)

Session musicians (later known as "the Wrecking Crew")

- Hal Blaine – drums
- Jimmy Bond – upright bass
- Frank Capp – bongos, tambourine, glockenspiel
- Ray Caton – trumpet
- Dick Hyde – tuba
- George Hyde – French horn
- Barney Kessel – 12-string electric guitar
- Larry Knechtel – harpsichord
- Al De Lory – grand piano
- Jay Migliori – flute
- Bill Pitman – Danelectro fuzz bass
- Ray Pohlman – Fender bass
