= None of Us Are Free =

Rhythm-and-blues song recorded by Ray Charles

"None of Us Are Free" is a rhythm and blues song written by Barry Mann, Cynthia Weil, and Brenda Russell in 1993. The song was first recorded by Ray Charles for his 1993 album My World, but it received relatively little attention at that time. Noting that it is one of five "socially-conscious songs on the album," a review in Jet described the song as "a piece that talks about the need for all people to get to know each other" and quotes Charles: "Music is powerful. As people listen to it, they can be affected. They respond. But when I was doing this album I wasn't trying to create an overall message. It just turned out that we got some songs that had something to say." In Ebony, Lynn Norment said this "catchy" song, and another album track, "One Drop of Love", "deliver pertinent social messages." Billboard writer Timothy White called the song as "a hard-rolling exhortation ... that deserves to be a multiformat radio anthem for these morally faltering times." Charles's biographer, Mike Evans, described the song in 2009 as "the main 'message' song on the album."

In 2002, soul singer Solomon Burke recorded a version featuring The Blind Boys of Alabama on backing vocals for his album Don't Give Up On Me. The album won the Grammy for Best Contemporary Blues Album, bringing Burke back into the public eye. The song was released as a single in the UK, and "None of Us Are Free" became a feature of Burke's later performances. The magazine No Depression described the song as "funk-fortified," and "a paean to justice through solidarity cowritten by Brill Building vets Barry Mann and Cynthia Weil" – in which Burke "admonishes on the chorus" while the Blind Boys of Alabama intone "implacably behind him." Scholar Lasczik Cutcher writes that the song "reiterates this notion of our collective humanity, especially when suffering: that we ought to stand together."

Burke's version was notably featured at the end of the sixth episode of the second season of House. It is also used at the end of episode three in season seven of Cold Case and at the end of the ninth episode of the first season of Snowfall.

In 2016, The Commissionaires released a version of the song as their debut single from their album Shelter Me. It was chosen as CBC Radio's Song Of The Week in Toronto, December 5, 2016. The song has also been recorded by:

- Chuck Negron: Am I Still in Your Heart? (1995)
- Hiroshima: Urban World Music (1996)
- Lynyrd Skynyrd: Twenty (1997)
- Sam Moore: Overnight Sensational (2006)
- Widespread Panic: Earth to Atlanta (2006)
- Nina Hagen: Volksbeat (2011, in German, as "Keiner Von Uns Ist Frei")
- Hanne Boel: Outtakes (2013/2014)
- Michael English: Love is the Golden Rule (2017)
- Sting and Sam Moore: Duets (2021)
- Rain Perry and BettySoo: on Perry's A White Album (2022)
