= Smile Records (United States) =

American record label

Smile Records is Los Angeles based powerpop independent record label founded in 1995 by musician-producer Tony Valenziano and Tansy Alexander. In 2001 Smile entered a distribution contract with video and DVD distributor Image Entertainment who wanted to enter the audio market.

== Roster ==
- The Knack
- Wondermints
- Carla Olson
- The Negro Problem
- Hutch
- Supremium
- The Stand
- Stew
- The Andersons
- Smash
- Sparkle*jets u.k.
- The Oranges
