= Wondermints =

US musical group

- Origin: Los Angeles, California, U.S.
- Genres: Power pop, progressive pop
- Years active: 1992–present
- Label: Smile
- Members: Darian Sahanaja; Mike D'Amico; Brian Kassan; David Nolte; Probyn Gregory
- Past members: Nick Walusko

The Wondermints are an American rock band from Los Angeles that released four studio albums between 1995 and 2002. The main line-up consisted of Darian Sahanaja (keyboards); Nick Walusko (also known as Nicky Wonder; guitar), and Mike D'Amico (percussion). The band members are also known for serving as part of the Brian Wilson Band from 1999 to 2022 and from 2025 onward for its reformation. Other contributors to the Wondermints have included Brian Kassan (bass), David Nolte (bass) and Probyn Gregory (various).

== History ==
The group formed in 1992, and released a vinyl single, "Proto Pretty", which was later compiled on Rhino Records' "Poptopia" series of power pop compilations. They followed this with the albums Wondermints (1995), Wonderful World of the Wondermints (an album of cover versions from 1996), Bali (1998) and Mind If We Make Love to You (2002). Most of these albums were released in Japan prior to release in the United States. The group also contributed to the soundtrack of the first Austin Powers movie at the request of Mike Myers.

In 1999, the group signed on to be part of Brian Wilson's touring band. Walusko and Gregory played with him continuously thereafter, with D'Amico having toured with Wilson only in 1999, 2000, 2002, and 2003. When D'Amico left to spend time with his family, he was replaced in 2001 and early 2002 by Andy Paley, and in 2004 by Nelson Bragg. D'Amico rejoined Wilson's band in the summer of 2008, replacing Jim Hines on drums after relieving fellow multi-instrumentalist Scott Bennett of his temporary drumming duties. Sahanaja also missed a few shows in 2003 and 2008, being replaced by Gary Griffin, and in 2016, when Billy Hinsche took his place.

All Wondermints can be heard on Wilson's CDs and DVDs Live at the Roxy Theatre, Brian Wilson on Tour, Pet Sounds Live, and Brian Wilson Reimagines Gershwin, with Sahanaja, Walusko, and Gregory also appearing on the Pet Sounds Live in London album and the studio albums Gettin' in Over My Head, Brian Wilson Presents Smile, That Lucky Old Sun and No Pier Pressure.

The band is part of a power pop scene in Los Angeles, many of whose members play on each other's records. All of the members of Wondermints, especially Gregory, have made frequent guest appearances and have several side projects, some of the more notable of which are Love, The Eels, Baby Lemonade, The Negro Problem, Stew and Kim Fox.

On August 7, 2019, Walusko died at the age of 59.

Wilson died in his sleep in his Beverly Hills home on June 11, 2025, at the age of 82.

== Albums ==
- Wondermints (1995)
- Wonderful World of the Wondermints (1996)
- Bali (1998)
- Mind If We Make Love to You (2002)
- Kaleidoscopin': Exploring Prisms of the Past (2009)
