= Don't Give Up on Me (album) =

Studio album by Solomon Burke
- Released: July 23, 2002
- Recorded: February 25–28, 2002
- Genres: Soul blues, gospel blues, R&B
- Length: 51:35
- Labels: Fat Possum; ANTI-
- Producer: Joe Henry

Solomon Burke chronology
Soulman (2002)	Don't Give Up on Me (2002)	The Incredible Solomon Burke at His Best (2002)

Singles from Don't Give Up on Me
- 1. "None of Us Are Free" Released: 2002

Professional ratings
Aggregate scores
Source	Rating
Metacritic	85/100
Review scores
Source	Rating
AllMusic	4.5/5 stars
E!	A
Entertainment Weekly	A
The Guardian	4/5 stars
Los Angeles Times	3.5/4 stars
Mojo	5/5 stars
Q	4/5 stars
Rolling Stone	4/5 stars
Uncut	8/10
The Village Voice	B−

Don't Give Up on Me is a studio album by American R&B/Soul singer Solomon Burke, recorded and released in 2002 on Fat Possum Records. The album won the Grammy Award for Best Contemporary Blues Album. It is noteworthy for the contributions of original and previously unreleased compositions by top-rank songwriters, the effect of which placed Burke back in the public eye for a time. Guest stars are Daniel Lanois, who plays electric guitar on "Stepchild", and The Blind Boys of Alabama, who feature on backing vocals for "None of Us Are Free". "None of Us Are Free" was also featured at the end of the sixth episode ("Spin") of the second season of House. "Fast Train" was featured during the ending montage of the season three finale of The Wire.

The title track, written by the team of Dan Penn and Carson Whitsett with Hoy Lindsey, gained popularity (and introduced Burke to a new generation) when it was used several times on the popular primetime teen soap opera The O.C. as one of the signature song of adult couple Sandy and Kirsten Cohen, played by Peter Gallagher and Kelly Rowan. It became a staple of Burke's live performances and has been covered by Joe Cocker, as well as Peter Gallagher, who also performed the song on The O.C.

== Track listing ==
1. "Don't Give Up on Me" (Dan Penn, Carson Whitsett, Hoy Lindsey) – 3:45
2. "Fast Train" (Van Morrison) – 5:43
3. "Diamond in Your Mind" (Tom Waits, Kathleen Brennan) – 4:24
4. "Flesh and Blood" (Joe Henry) – 6:07
5. "Soul Searchin'" (Brian Wilson, Andy Paley) – 3:59
6. "Only a Dream" (Van Morrison) – 5:09
7. "The Judgment" (Elvis Costello, Cait O'Riordan) – 3:30
8. "Stepchild" (Bob Dylan) – 5:10
9. "The Other Side of the Coin" (Nick Lowe) – 3:46
10. "None of Us Are Free" (Barry Mann, Cynthia Weil, Brenda Russell) – 5:29
11. "Sit This One Out" (Pick Purnell) – 4:33

== Personnel ==
- Solomon Burke – vocals, piano, electric guitar
- Chris Bruce – electric guitar
- David Palmer – piano, keyboard
- David Piltch – bass guitar
- Jay Bellerose – drums, percussion
- Bennie Wallace – tenor saxophone
- Niki Harris – backing vocals
- Jean McClain – backing vocals
- Rudy Copeland – Hammond organ
- Daniel Lanois – electric guitar
- Clarence Fountain – backing vocals
- Jimmy Carter – backing vocals
- Bishop Billy Bowers – backing vocals
- Ben Moore – backing vocals
- Eric McKinnie – backing vocals
- Caleb Butler – backing vocals
- Joey Williams – backing vocals
- Tracy Pierce – backing vocals
