= Soul Searchin' (Brian Wilson and Andy Paley song) =

Song by Brian Wilson featuring Carl Wilson

from the album Gettin' In over My Head
- Released: June 22, 2004
- Recorded: November 1995 – 2004
- Genre: Soul
- Label: Brimel/Rhino
- Songwriters: Brian Wilson, Andy Paley
- Producer: Brian Wilson

Licensed audio
- "Soul Searchin'" on YouTube

"Soul Searchin'" is a song written by American musicians Brian Wilson and Andy Paley for an aborted Beach Boys reunion album in the 1990s. It was later recorded by Solomon Burke (on his 2002 album Don't Give Up on Me) and Wilson himself (on his 2004 album Gettin' In over My Head). The Beach Boys' recording was the last to feature lead vocals from Carl Wilson, who died in 1998.

== Background and Beach Boys version ==
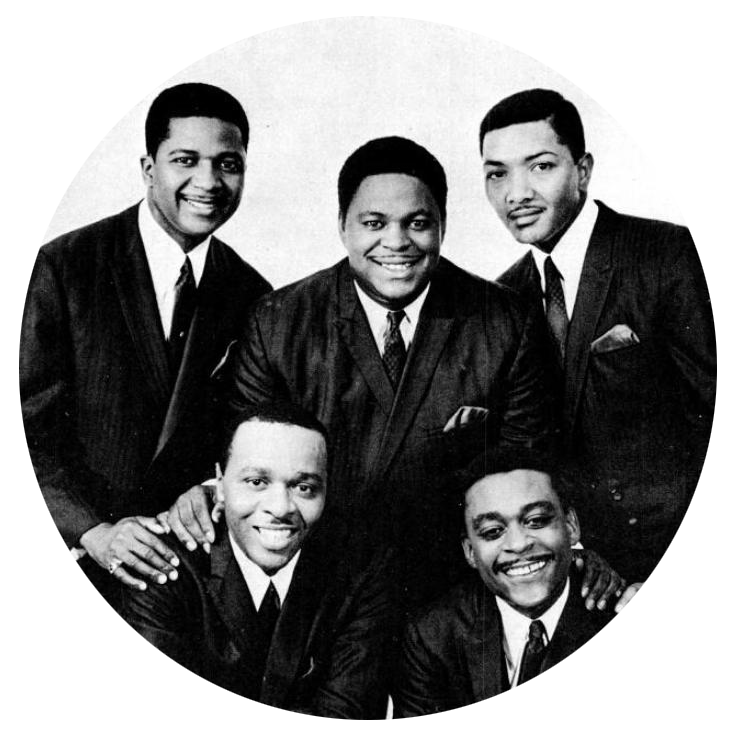
The song was inspired by doo-wop group the Dells

Elaborating on the origins of "Soul Searchin'", Paley said that he had the track finished before Wilson had heard it, but not its lyrics. "Brian came up with the first line (recites “I was a bum…”) and we worked on it from there. Brian contributed heavily with lyrics on that one." Wilson was especially proud of that opening line. Recalling the recording session with the Beach Boys, Paley said, "We had meetings and everything was getting rolling. ... Everyone was so happy to be there ... First I thought: 'Wow, this could really happen.' And when Carl sang 'Soul Searchin',' it was like ... wow this really is going to happen!" According to Paley, "They all thought it was a hit", although he remembered Bruce Johnston commenting to him, "You might want to ask Brian about that opening lyric. I don't know about that."

The track was intended by Paley to sound like the Dells, a doo-wop group best known for the 1956 hit "Oh What a Nite". Paley said that the original mix of "Soul Searchin'" was "really good; the way I wanted to sound in my head was like a Philly soul record. A lot of stuff was added to the Beach Boys track, things that I wasn’t nuts about — like acoustic guitars." Ultimately, the project collapsed. Brian blamed Carl and said that Carl disliked "Soul Searchin'" and did not want it released. Brian's wife Melinda Ledbetter also blamed Carl, saying that he did not believe the music was commercial enough.

A version of the Beach Boys' recording that combined the group's vocals with Paley's backing track was released on the 2013 box set Made in California.

== Solomon Burke version ==
Solomon Burke recorded a version for his 2002 album Don't Give Up on Me. Reviewing the album for Vibe, Dimitri Ehrlich described the song as "a gently swinging tune that showcases Burke's roasted-chestnut voice."

== Brian Wilson version ==
In 2004, Brian revisited the song for his 2004 album Gettin' In over My Head, using Carl's original lead vocal from the Beach Boys' unreleased version. AllMusic critic John Bush said that the track was one of the album's highlights and decreed, "Lyrics aside, Carl's soul and emotion rescue the song."
