= Darian Sahanaja =

American singer-songwriter (born 1963)

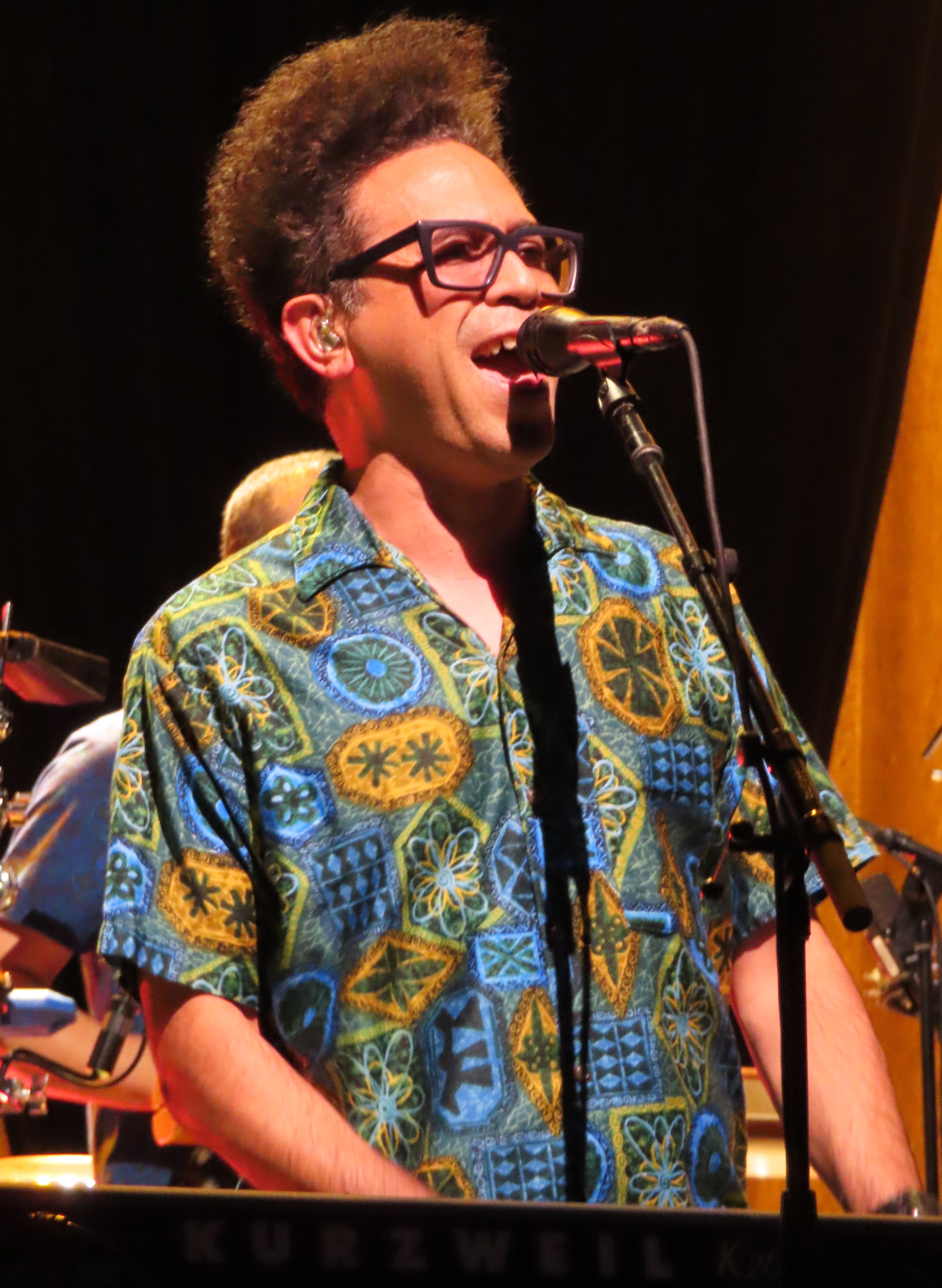
- Sahanaja performing with Brian Wilson, 2019

Background information
- Born: May 20, 1963 (age 63); Los Angeles, California, U.S.
- Genres: Rock; pop
- Occupations: Singer; songwriter; arranger; musician
- Instruments: Vocals; keyboards
- Years active: 1992–present

Darian Sahanaja (born May 20, 1963) is an American singer, songwriter, keyboardist, and arranger who is most notable for co-founding Wondermints in 1992 and having played in the Brian Wilson Band beginning in 1999. He has also performed with the Zombies and Heart.

== Association with Brian Wilson ==
According to Sahanaja, the first record he ever bought was the Beach Boys greatest hits compilation Endless Summer (1974), and he "used to take physical beatings from neighborhood boys for being a fan." In the early 1980s, he became obsessed with the band's unfinished Smile album after hearing an unreleased version of the song "Wonderful". Sahanaja stated that it "pretty much changed my life." He said, "When I met Nick Walusko, who I formed the Wondermints with, one of the first things we bonded over was Smile bootlegs. We got to know [music historian] Domenic Priore and a small group of us became the Smile intelligentsia of that period."

In 2003, Sahanaja worked with Brian Wilson and Van Dyke Parks in sequencing and arranging the fragments of the unfinished Smile album into a completed work. Wilson, Sahanaja and the rest of Wilson's band performed Brian Wilson Presents Smile both live, and in the studio. Wilson's wife Melinda praised Sahanaja as "an unsung hero on the Smile project. If it weren't for him, and Brian feeling so comfortable with his assistance, I don't think it would have happened."

In 2013, Sahanaja was the Supervising Music Consultant and acted as Paul Dano's musical coach for the Brian Wilson biopic Love & Mercy (2014).

== Other work ==
Sahanaja performed alongside The Zombies on the 40th anniversary tour and the 2015 tour of their 1968 album Odessey and Oracle. He later performed with Heart at the Dreamboat Annie Live concert, writing string arrangements, while also playing percussion, keyboards, and singing background vocals. In 2012, Sahanaja appeared on the Beach Boys' reunion album, That's Why God Made the Radio, and the subsequent anniversary tour, playing keyboards and providing backing vocals.

Sahanaja was the composer for the Disney XD original series Future-Worm! (2016-2018).
