= Pet Sounds =

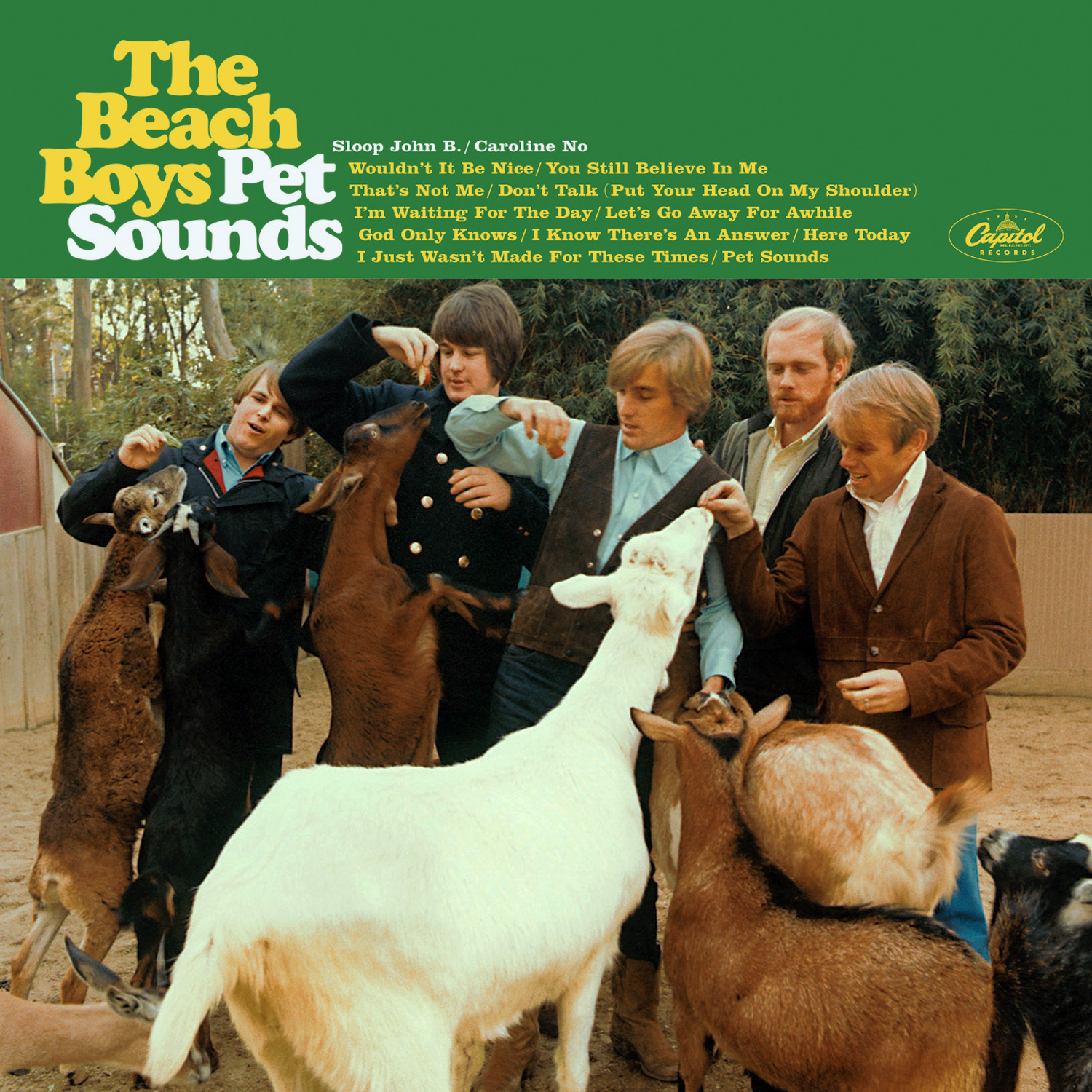

Studio album by the Beach Boys
- Released: May 16, 1966
- Recorded: July 12, 1965 – c. April 17, 1966
- Studios: Western; Gold Star; Columbia; Sunset Sound (Hollywood)
- Genres: Progressive pop; chamber pop; psychedelic pop; art rock
- Length: 35:57
- Label: Capitol
- Producer: Brian Wilson

The Beach Boys chronology
Beach Boys' Party! (1965)	Pet Sounds (1966)	Best of the Beach Boys (1966)

Singles from Pet Sounds
- 1. "Caroline, No" Released: March 7, 1966; 2. "Sloop John B" Released: March 21, 1966; 3. "Wouldn't It Be Nice" / "God Only Knows" Released: July 18, 1966

Pet Sounds is the eleventh studio album by the American rock band the Beach Boys, released on May 16, 1966, by Capitol Records. It was produced, arranged, and primarily composed by Brian Wilson with guest lyricist Tony Asher. Recorded largely between January and April 1966, it furthered the orchestral sound introduced in The Beach Boys Today! (1965). Seeking to expand Phil Spector's Wall of Sound technique and surpass the Beatles' Rubber Soul (1965), Wilson's orchestrations blended pop, jazz, exotica, classical, and avant-garde elements, combining rock instrumentation with layered vocal harmonies, found sounds, and instruments not normally associated with rock. It was their first album in which studio musicians, such as the Wrecking Crew, largely replaced the band on their instruments, and the first in which any rock group abandoned the small-ensemble format for an entire album. Its unprecedented total production cost exceeded $70,000 (equivalent to $690,000 in 2025).

An early rock concept album, the lyrics explored introspective themes through songs like "You Still Believe in Me", about self-awareness of flaws; "I Know There's an Answer", a critique of LSD culture; and "I Just Wasn't Made for These Times", addressing social alienation. Lead single "Caroline, No" was issued as Wilson's official solo debut, followed by the group's "Sloop John B" and "Wouldn't It Be Nice". The album received a lukewarm critical response in the U.S. and peaked at number 10 on the Billboard Top LPs chart. Bolstered by band publicist Derek Taylor's promotional efforts, it was lauded by UK critics and musicians, reaching number 2 on the Record Retailer chart and remaining in the top ten for six months. A planned follow-up album, Smile, was shelved and substituted with Smiley Smile in 1967.

Pet Sounds is recognized for its ambitious production and sophisticated harmonic structures, and it is widely regarded as among the greatest and most influential albums in music history. It is credited with introducing novel orchestration techniques and structural harmonies while also revolutionizing music production through its detail and use of the studio as a compositional tool. It elevated recognition of popular music as an art form and albums as cohesive works, while contributing to synthesizer adoption and the evolution of orchestral pop, psychedelia, soft rock/sunshine pop, and progressive rock/pop. Long overshadowed by the Beatles' works, Pet Sounds initially gained limited mainstream recognition until reissues revived its prominence, leading to top placements on all-time greatest album lists by various publications. The 1997 expanded reissue, The Pet Sounds Sessions, debuted its first true stereo mix. Wilson toured performing the album in the early 2000s and late 2010s.

== Background ==
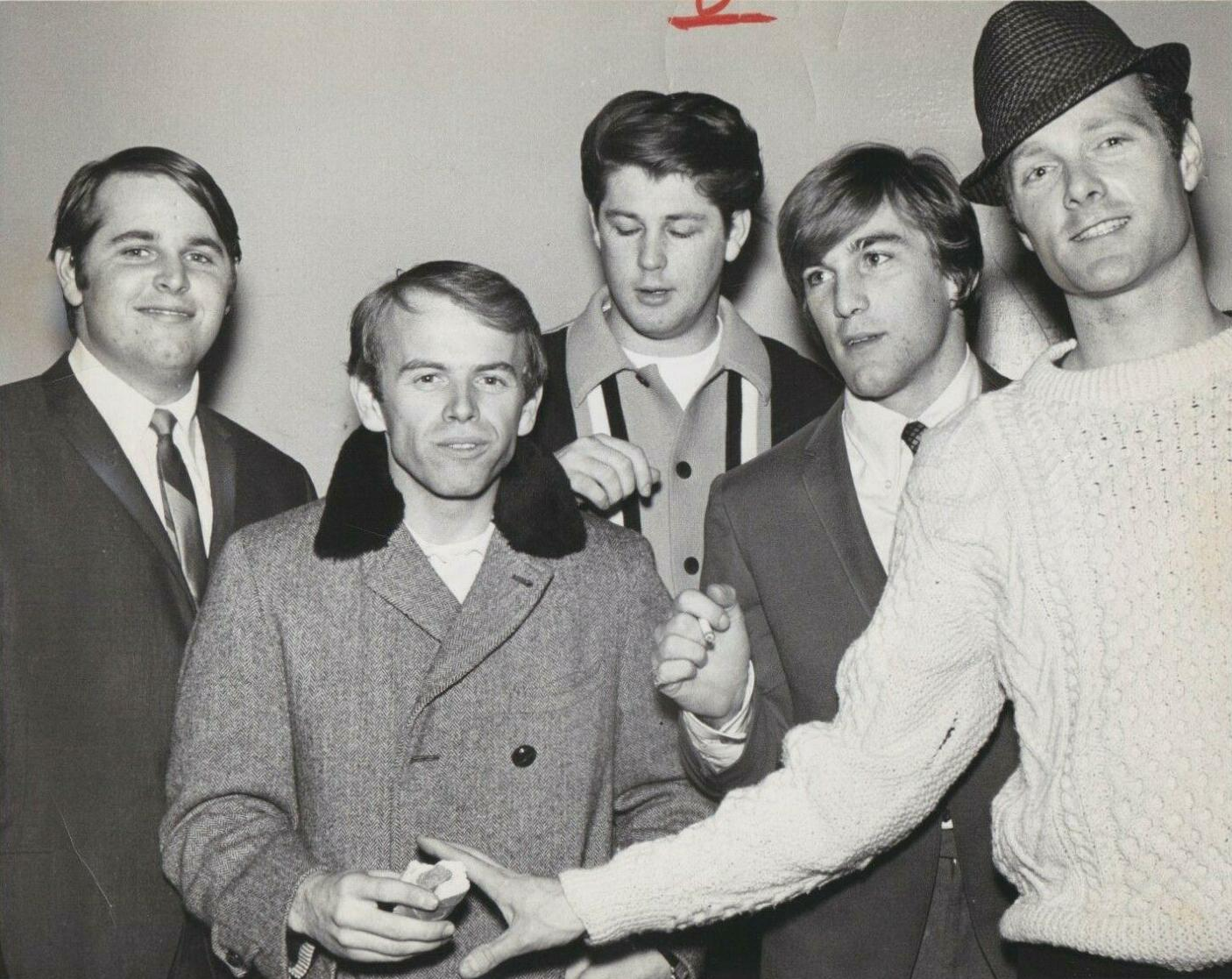
The Beach Boys in February 1965. From left: Carl Wilson, Al Jardine, Brian and Dennis Wilson, and Mike Love

The Beach Boys' sixth album, All Summer Long (1964), concluded their beach-themed period, and they began to alter their stylistic and lyrical direction. In January 1965, Brian Wilson, leader of the band, declared his withdrawal from touring to concentrate on songwriting and studio production. The rest of the group—Brian's brothers Carl and Dennis, cousin Mike Love, and friend Al Jardine—continued touring without him. Session musician Glen Campbell initially filled his role, followed by Bruce Johnston.

Through 1965, Wilson showcased great advances in his musical development with The Beach Boys Today! and Summer Days (And Summer Nights!!). Today! departed from the group's earlier sound through orchestral arrangements and a move away from surfing, car, and simplistic love motifs. Its lyrics adopted an autobiographical and emotional tone and, on the record's second side, contained five songs with a unified theme. Summer Days, issued three months later, bridged Wilson's progressive style with the band's pre-1965 approach. Wilson began recording "Sloop John B" but shelved the track to focus on Beach Boys' Party!, an informal album created to meet Capitol Records' demand for a Christmas release. Later in the year, he refined "Sloop John B" and recorded six new compositions. Without consultation, Capitol issued "Barbara Ann" from Party! as a single; Wilson dismissed it as unrepresentative of their upcoming work in an early 1966 interview.

== Writing sessions ==
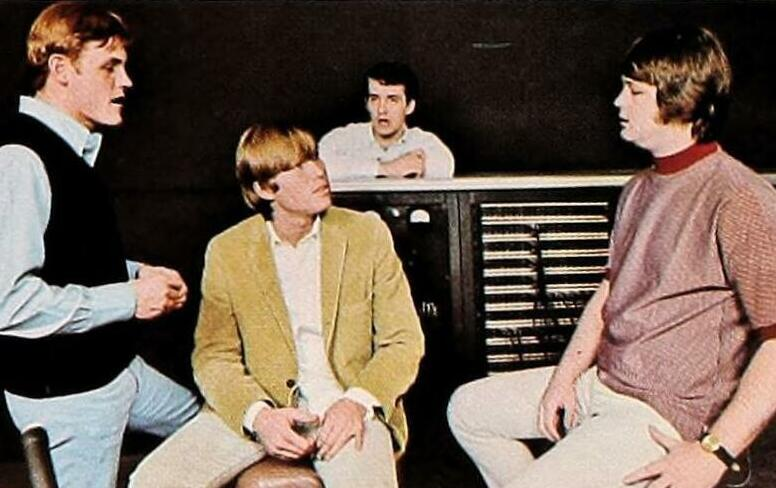
From left: Johnston, Melcher, Asher, and Brian at a Pet Sounds recording session in early 1966.

In 1965, Wilson met Tony Asher, a lyricist and jingle writer, at a Los Angeles recording studio. After exchanging song ideas, Wilson learned of Asher's abilities and proposed a creative partnership to write songs unlike his prior work. Asher accepted, and their writing sessions began within ten days, starting with "You Still Believe in Me". (Note: 1965 is the date given by most sources. Others state that Wilson had met Asher during a social gathering at mutual friend Loren Schwartz's house. Carlin dates the initial meeting between Asher and Wilson to early 1963 and their proposal to collaborate following in December 1965. Asher recalled that Wilson called him when the rest of the band were out of the country.) They continued their collaboration over a roughly three-week period in early 1966, likely January through February, writing at Wilson's home. (Note: This is Charles Granata's rough estimation. As of 2003, most of the documentation that could have provided a more definitive chronology of the album's writing had been lost. Carlin dates the start of the writing sessions to December 1965. In 2009, Wilson himself recalled that he may have been writing with Asher as early as November 1965.) Sessions often started with Wilson introducing musical fragments—such as chord patterns or melodic ideas he had developed over time—discussing the particular aesthetics of records by other artists, or proposing a lyrical theme. Their preliminary sketches, which they referred to as "feels", were developed with occasional marijuana use. (Note: Wilson's writing process, as he described in 1966, started with finding a basic chord pattern and rhythm that he termed "feels", or "brief note sequences, fragments of ideas". He explained, "once they're out of my head and into the open air, I can see them and touch them firmly. They're not 'feels' anymore.") Lyrics were typically completed prior to recording sessions, often commencing immediately after composition, though booking times were never planned in advance.

It felt like we were writing an autobiography, but oddly enough, I wouldn't limit it to Brian's autobiography [...] We were working in a somewhat intimate relationship, and I didn't know him at all, so he was finding out who I was, and I was finding out who he was.

— Tony Asher

Asher saw his role as to provide feedback on Wilson's developing melodies and chord progressions, though they exchanged ideas throughout. Regarding their lyrical collaboration, he explained, "The general tenor of the lyrics was always his [...] and the actual choice of words was usually mine. I was really just his interpreter." Asher later cited significant musical contributions to "I Just Wasn't Made for These Times", "Caroline, No", and "That's Not Me" and claimed conceptual input on three songs. He agreed to receive 25% of publishing royalties, a share he considered disproportionate to his contributions.

In his wife Marilyn's recollection, Brian worked on Pet Sounds virtually nonstop, and that when he was home, "he was either at the piano, arranging, or eating." After their songs were completed, Asher observed a few recording sessions, mostly involving string overdubs.

Wilson collaborated on two additional tracks. "I Know There's an Answer", co-written previously with Beach Boys road manager Terry Sachen. In 1994, Love received retroactive co-writing credits for "Wouldn't It Be Nice" and "I Know There's an Answer", though his contributions beyond "I'm Waiting for the Day" are generally regarded as minimal. The remaining two instrumental tracks, "Let's Go Away for Awhile" and "Pet Sounds", were composed by Wilson alone. Originally recorded as backing tracks for existing songs, he decided that the tracks were more effective without vocals.

== Concept and lyrics ==
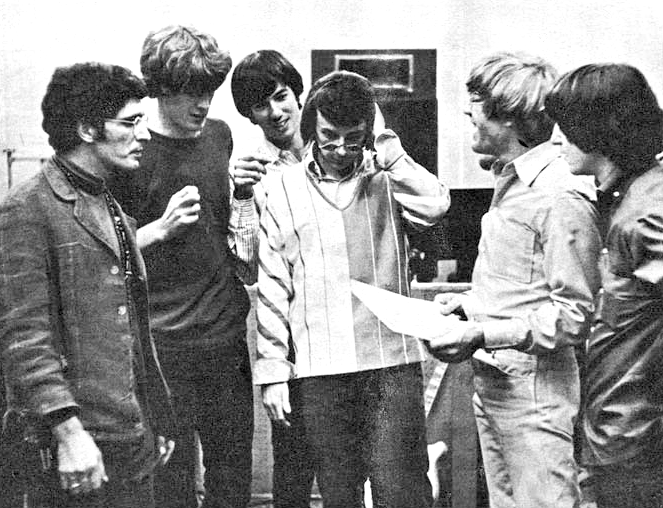
Phil Spector (center) at Gold Star Studios, where he developed his Wall of Sound method (1965)

Commentators frequently cite Pet Sounds as a concept album, with some considering it the first such work in rock music. (Note: Author Carys Wyn Jones attributes this characterization to the record's "uniform excellence" rather than an explicit narrative or musical motif, while Lambert acknowledges the album's "unifying threads of melodic figures and harmonic devices".) Wilson identified Pet Sounds as an "interpretation" of Phil Spector's Wall of Sound technique that aimed to emulate aspects of Spector's productions, particularly the combination of color tones to create new textures. In a 1988 interview, he framed the Beach Boys as "messengers" of Spector's work and innovations via Pet Sounds. On another occasion, he stated:

If you take the Pet Sounds album as a collection of art pieces, each designed to stand alone, yet which belong together, you'll see what I was aiming at. [...] It wasn't really a song concept album, or lyrically a concept album; it was really a production concept album.

Wilson also sought to create "a complete statement" with Pet Sounds after hearing the Beatles' album Rubber Soul (December 1965). The American edition of Rubber Soul, reconfigured by Capitol to appear more folk rock, struck Wilson as unified and free of filler tracks—uncommon at a time when albums primarily served to promote singles. He had usually included comparatively superficial subject matter on Beach Boys albums and viewed Rubber Soul as a challenge to elevate his approach, declaring to his wife that he would create "the greatest rock album ever made".

Musicologist Michael Zager wrote that Pet Sounds aligns closer with Spector's Wall of Sound than Rubber Soul through its incorporation of the technique's hallmarks. Carl stated Brian held greater admiration for Spector over the Beatles, with Brian frequently crediting Spector's methods as foundational to his own production style. Wilson credited Rubber Soul as his "main motivator" and with inspiring him to create music "on the same level" without seeking to replicate the Beatles' sound. (Note: Asher recalled Wilson playing him the album and declaring a desire to surpass it, while Johnston remembered Wilson praising its thematic cohesion after a Christmas 1965 listening session. In a 2002 foreword for Mojo, Wilson wrote that although he had already begun working on some of the songs, the urge to express his feelings after hearing Rubber Soul led to his decision to seek out a new lyricist. Conversely, he told David Leaf in 1996 that he believed he was introduced to the LP by Asher. In 2009, he said he wrote "God Only Knows" with Asher the morning after listening to the album for the first time.) In 2009, he said that although "Rubber Soul didn't clarify my ideas for Pet Sounds", the Beatles' use of sitar had inspired his choice of instrumentation for the album. (Note: In a 1966 interview, Wilson contrasted their approaches, suggesting his arrangements would have expanded tracks like "Norwegian Wood" with orchestration, "background voices", and "a thousand things".)

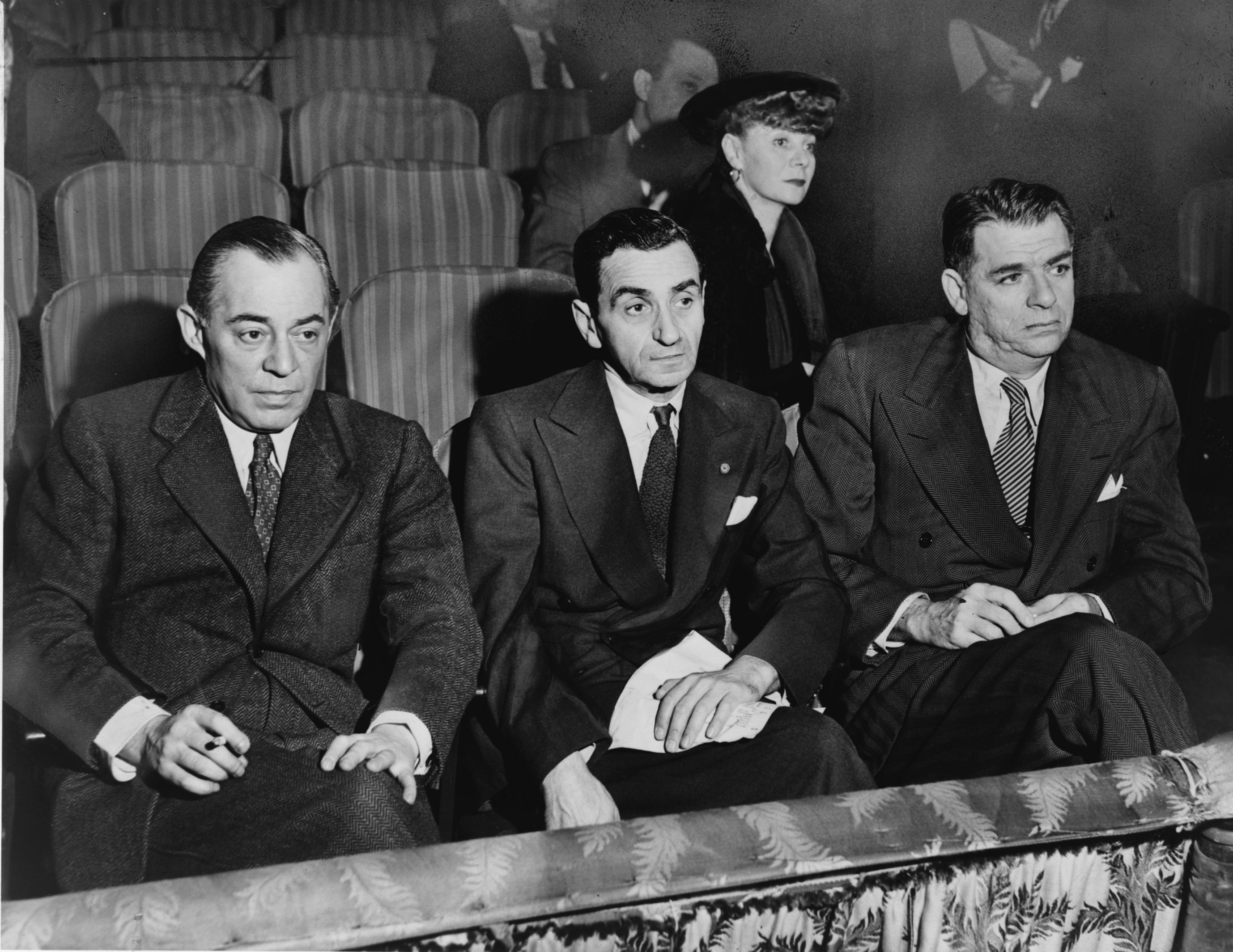
Asher and Wilson modeled Pet Sounds after Tin Pan Alley's songwriting craftmanship (pictured in 1948; Rodgers and Hammerstein with Irving Berlin)

Asher disputed the notion that he and Wilson had followed templates set by the Beatles or rock in general, recalling Wilson aimed to craft "classical American love songs" akin to Cole Porter or Rodgers and Hammerstein. Asher introduced jazz recordings to Wilson, who was "blown away" by records such as Duke Ellington's "Sophisticated Lady" (1932) and Hampton Hawes' "All the Things You Are" (1955). (Note: Asher also shared standards like "Stella by Starlight", believing their harmonic complexity would appeal to Wilson's interest in unconventional progressions, such as those in "The Warmth of the Sun" (1964).) Asher remembered that Wilson "didn't know much about jazz or jazz standards, but he knew the Four Freshmen". Drawing from his own studio experience, Asher advocated for incorporating classical instruments like violins, cellos, and bass flutes into the arrangements.

In 1966, Wilson likened his work to that of the Burt Bacharach and Hal David songwriting team. Nelson Riddle's orchestral arrangements also influenced Wilson's approach; biographer Jon Stebbins felt Riddle's impact was more pronounced than Spector's on the album. (Note: Musician Jim Irvin agreed that the "dense, lush arrangements" were indebted "at least as much to Nelson Riddle" as they were to Spector's arranger, Jack Nitzsche.) Wilson characterized his collaboration with Asher as more focused on artistic integrity than competition with contemporaries like Spector or Motown. (Note: In a March 1966 interview, Wilson acknowledged contemporary music trends' influence on his work, though Marilyn later stated he was singularly focused on creating "the greatest rock album ever" and unconcerned with industry developments.)

=== Spirituality and coming of age themes ===
I got into marijuana and it opened some doors for me and I got a little more committed to [...] the making of music for people on a spiritual level.

— Brian Wilson, 1994

During his first LSD trip in April 1965, Wilson had what he considered to be "a very religious experience" and claimed to have perceived God. He frequently referenced the album's spiritual qualities in interviews and recalled that he and Carl conducted prayer sessions for global healing that transformed the atmosphere into "a religious ceremony"; Carl proposed "a special album" following their spiritual practices. Brian explained in 1994, "We prayed for an album that would be a rival to Rubber Soul. It was like a prayer, but there was some ego there." Suffering from lifelong auditory hallucinations that emerged shortly after his first LSD experience, he later attributed the drug's influence to himself developing "insecurities ... which I think went into the music".

People always thought Brian was a good-time guy until he started releasing those heavy, searching songs on Pet Sounds. But that stuff was closer to his personality and perceptions.

— Dennis Wilson

Despite its increased musical sophistication, Wilson intended for the album's subject matter to be relatable to adolescents. The lyrics recurrently explored themes of disillusionment with adulthood and lost innocence and contrasted with the group's earlier celebrations of adolescence, exemplified by the narrator of "Wouldn't It Be Nice" wishing to be older. (Note: Critics Richard Goldstein and Nik Cohn felt that the album's melancholic lyrics sometimes jarred with its music, with Cohn describing it as "sad songs about loneliness and heartache; sad songs even about happiness." Rolling Stone editor David Wild characterized the lyrics as "intelligent and moving, but [...] not pretentious", comparing them to Tin Pan Alley's craftsmanship.) Much of the pessimistic and dejected content stemmed from his marital struggles, exacerbated by his drug use. Marilyn, upon hearing "You Still Believe in Me" and "Caroline, No", felt those songs had directly addressed their marriage. According to Asher, he and Wilson drew from extensive discussions about women and relationship dynamics to inspire their songs, including Wilson's doubts about his marriage, "sexual fantasies", and attraction to his sister-in-law Diane, although their songwriting conversations focused on hypothetical scenarios.

Pet Sounds is sometimes suggested to be a song cycle portraying the unraveling of a romantic relationship. While Pet Sounds exhibits unified emotional themes, no deliberate narrative was planned. Asher and Wilson never discussed a specific concept, though Asher acknowledged Wilson's potential to unconsciously shape one. (Note: Responding to the songwriters' denials of a conscious lyric theme, journalist Nick Kent wrote that the album's lyrics predominantly depict a male protagonist's struggles with self-identity and crises of faith in love and life, excluding "Sloop John B" and the instrumentals. Granata writes that while these tracks disrupt the album's "thematic thread", they enhance its pacing.) Author Scott Schinder argued that Wilson and Asher had crafted a song cycle about "the emotional challenges accompanying the transition from youth to adulthood", paired with "a series of intimate, hymn-like love songs". Music historian Larry Star traced a thematic progression from "youthful optimism [...] to philosophical and emotional disillusionment" across its track sequencing. Lambert argued that Wilson likely intended a narrative, influenced by "theme albums" by Frank Sinatra and the Four Freshmen. (Note: Lambert distinguishes "theme albums"—collections of songs linked by shared lyrical content but lacking musical cohesion—from concept albums, which integrate recurring melodic, harmonic, or other elements into a unified artistic presentation. With regards to the issue of authorial intent, he felt that artists' commentaries on their work may reflect external agendas or lack objectivity, and that the artwork itself should remain the primary basis for analysis.)

== Composition ==
=== Genre, debate over categorization and psychedelia ===
Wilson refined the themes and complex arranging style he had introduced with The Beach Boys Today!, such that writers often refer to the second side of Today! as a precursor to Pet Sounds. (Note: Music journalist Alice Bolin characterized Today! as bridging the group's doo-wop roots with "the lush and orchestral" style of Pet Sounds, while Scott Interrante highlighted Wilson's early experimentation with blending ballad and uptempo structures, adding that Today! had reflected the optimism of adolescence in contrast to Pet Sounds' melancholic tone. Leaf identified the Today! outtake "Guess I'm Dumb", later produced as a 1965 single for Glen Campbell, as a leap in Wilson's development, being "one of the first records that consolidated all [Brian's] ideas into a coherent sound" that culminated in Pet Sounds Howard referenced "Please Let Me Wonder" as further signaling Wilson's progression toward his subsequent project.) Musicologist Daniel Harrison contends that his development as a composer and arranger on Pet Sounds was incremental relative to his earlier work, while its unconventional harmonic progressions and hypermetric disruptions extended techniques already demonstrated in their 1964 songs "The Warmth of the Sun" and "Don't Back Down". Musicologist Charles Granata describes the album as a culmination of Wilson's songwriting artistry, although he had transitioned "from writing car and surf songs to writing studious ones" by 1965, and John Covach identifies the "California Girls" single as anticipating "the more intensely experimental" approach of Pet Sounds, while Carl, Dennis, and Jardine later traced its B-side "Let Him Run Wild" as marking their recognition of Wilson's evolving production style leading into Pet Sounds.

I thought of it as chapel rock [...] commercial choir music. I wanted to make an album that would stand up in ten years.

— Brian Wilson

Pet Sounds blends elements of pop, jazz, classical, exotica, and avant-garde music. Stebbins argues that the album defies singular categorization: "Pet Sounds is at times futuristic, progressive, and experimental. [...] and the only blues are in the themes and in Brian's voice." Johnston heard persistent doo-wop and R&B influences. Music journalist Noah Berlatsky attributed various "white-coded" elements to the pop R&B tradition. (Note: Berlatsky argued that while Pet Sounds is rarely regarded as an R&B album and, in some respects, is seen as a counter to R&B traditions, this perception had been shaped by prevailing stereotypes about race, authenticity, and vulnerability, particularly regarding soul music, typically viewed "as less important—or more often just forgotten altogether.") Having seldom used string ensembles prior to Pet Sounds, Wilson drew from older popular music styles, as did Spector, and some of his innovations had precedents in 1950s incidental music and Muzak arrangements. (Note: While challenging the album's classification as rock music, journalist D. Strauss stated that listeners "neglected to notice" this quality and argued that the subversion of rock traditions was what contributed to the LP's significance in rock history; he proposed that categorizing it as easy listening (or "elevator music") revealed the work as "historically grounded, if incredibly ambitious".) Wilson's orchestrations drew stylistic parallels to exotica producers such as Les Baxter, Martin Denny, and Esquivel, particularly through the incorporation of culturally diverse timbres. (Note: Denny's former bandmember Julius Wechter contributed percussion to the album, and Wilson indicated in his second memoir that he had enjoyed Baxter's "big productions that sounded sort of like Phil Spector", but stated an unfamiliarity with Denny and "exotica music" in a 2017 phone interview.)

"I Know There's an Answer" sections
Pet Sounds contrasts with contemporaneous psychedelic pop in its "intimacy", yet its use of reverb, "whisper"-like textures, and abrupt shifts create a "somewhat trippy effect", according to Consequence contributor Zach Ruskin. Wilson cited the tack piano and organ mix here as an example of himself applying Spector's formula.

Commentators have variously categorized the album as progressive pop, the descriptor used in its initial marketing, as well as chamber pop, psychedelic pop, and art rock. It is typically categorized among other pioneering psychedelic rock albums, although many commentators have been reluctant to include the Beach Boys within psychedelic music. (Note: Vernon Joyson, in his book The Acid Trip: A Complete Guide to Psychedelic Music, recognized the album's psychedelic elements, but excluded it from significant coverage, arguing that the band had "essentially predated the psychedelic era".) Wilson himself felt that while some songs contain psychedelic elements, the album overall was not. Academics Paul Hegarty and Martin Halliwell attribute the psychedelic sound to Wilson's production approach—eclectic instrumentation, echo, reverb, and Spector-inspired techniques—which created layered and interwoven soundscapes. (Note: DeRogatis, in his book about psychedelic rock, contrasts the album's introspective tone with the Beatles' post-LSD focus on societal issues. Hegarty and Halliwell also describe Pet Sounds as combining "personal intimacy" with a "trippy feel" linked to Wilson's LSD use, distinguishing it from contemporaneous psychedelic music such as the San Francisco sound.) Historian Dale Carter cites dense sonic textures, structural complexity, novel instrument combinations, shifting tonal centers, and hypnotic rhythms as psychedelic qualities present in the Beach Boys' mid-1960s output. (Note: Among other reasons given for the album's perceived psychedelic quality, DeRogatis argued that its layered melodies mirror the gradual revelations of a psychedelic experience, unfolding new details with repeated listens. Musician Sean Lennon suggested that psychedelic music often involves epic, ambitious records, and likened experiencing Pet Sounds in full to temporarily "entering another world", akin to an LSD trip.)

The term "baroque pop" was absent from early critical discussions about Pet Sounds, which instead favored "progressive", and emerged later in 1990s critiques of artists it influenced. Academic John Howland argued in 2021 that the album's baroque pop traits were almost exclusive to "God Only Knows". Other genres attributed to the album have included pop rock, experimental rock, avant-pop, experimental pop, symphonic rock, and folk rock.

=== Orchestrations and musical architecture ===
On Pet Sounds, Wilson combined standard rock instrumentation with intricate layers of vocal harmonies and many instruments which had rarely, if ever been used in rock. This included ukulele, sleigh bells, accordion, French and English horns, timpani, vibraphone, and tack piano—all of which had appeared on Today!—in addition to bass harmonica, güiro, bass clarinet, bongos, glockenspiel, banjo, bicycle horn, Coca-Cola cans, and Electro-Theremin. His approach to orchestration adapted classical instrumentation to rock sensibilities rather than superimposing classical elements onto rock. Tracks on Pet Sounds averaged around a dozen unique instruments, ranging from six on "That's Not Me" to over 15 on "God Only Knows". Wilson frequently employed doubling, where two instruments play the same melody. Though it had been long used in orchestral and classical arrangements, its use in rock was predominantly restricted to electric bass. He expanded it to many instruments, including violins and accordions. Electric and acoustic basses were also frequently doubled and played with a hard plectrum.

Pet Sounds incorporates tempo changes, metrical ambiguity, and novel instrumental timbres that, according to musicologist James Perone, distinguish it from virtually "anything else [...] in 1966 pop music". Comparing the group's earlier output, musicologist Marshall Heiser identified a heightened spatial and textural dimensionality; "more inventive" chord progressions and voicings; an avoidance of conventional backbeats; and orchestrations drawing from Baxter's exotica "quirkiness" and Bacharach's "cool" pop sensibilities rather than Spector's "teen fanfares". Drums were employed less for steady rhythm than for textural and tonal effects. The vocal harmonies are fewer and more complex, sometimes employing counterpoint, and the band used doo-wop-style nonsense syllables more frequently than on previous releases.

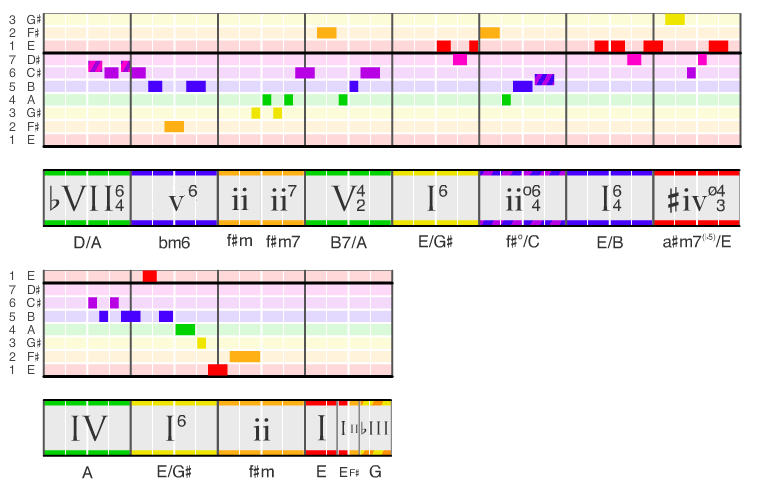
The Pet Sounds compositions are distinguished for avoiding definite key signatures. Pictured is a visual representation of the harmonic structures present in the verse and chorus of "God Only Knows".

The album predominantly features chords that are slashed, diminished, major seventh, sixths, or suspended, with augmented and ninth chords appearing less commonly. Every track is in a major key, some unusual; "You Still Believe in Me" uses B, a key with numerous sharps and flats that keyboardists typically avoid, while "That's Not Me" is in F♯, the key farthest from C. Wilson employed a vertical compositional approach using block chords, rather than horizontal classical structures, and often engaged in polytonality through stacking different chords across bass and treble clefs. Four tracks maintain a strongly established key: "You Still Believe in Me" (B), "I'm Waiting for the Day" (E), "Sloop John B" (A♭), and "I Just Wasn't Made for These Times" (B♭). Most other songs shift between multiple keys or, in the case of "God Only Knows", lack a definitive tonal center. Two tracks—"That's Not Me" and "Let's Go Away for Awhile"—begin and end in distinct keys.

Song structures largely follow convention: three tracks follow the AABA quatrain format, while eight use verse-chorus frameworks. The exceptions include "I'm Waiting for the Day", which extends a verse-refrain structure through three repetitions before concluding with unrelated thematic material, "That's Not Me", structured as a binary form with developmental repetition, and three more compositions—"You Still Believe in Me", "Let's Go Away for Awhile", and "Pet Sounds"—that contain two distinct, non-repeating sections.

==== Structural unity ====
Intro of "Pet Sounds"
The title track features a Leslie speaker-processed lead guitar and incorporates cyclic motifs prevalent throughout Pet Sounds, including a major submediant (VI) shift, arch-shaped melodic figures, and descending bass line.

In discerning its classification as a "concept album", musicologist Philip Lambert posits that its "overall unity" consists of common elements evolved from Today!. While subtle, Wilson deliberately used these to ensure the album "felt like it all belonged together". Techniques in Today!, such as recurring scale motifs were realized in Pet Sounds tracks like "Don't Talk (Put Your Head on My Shoulder)", where ascending stepwise vocal phrases (G♭ to C♭) receive mirrored instrumental responses. (Note: "Kiss Me Baby" had featured a four-note titular motif transformed through choral interplay and instrumental reinforcement, while "Good to My Baby" constructed its melodic framework around persistent stepwise patterns mirroring lyrical themes of emotional ambivalence.) According to Lambert, this arch-shaped motif serves as a unifying thread throughout the album, appearing in the concluding organ phrase in "I Know There's an Answer" and the vibraphone progression during the second half of "Let's Go Away for Awhile", among other tracks. (Note: A reversed version appears in the closing of "Wouldn't It Be Nice", the instrumental accompaniment throughout "I'm Waiting for the Day", while interlocking standard/inverted bassline forms in "God Only Knows", with chromatically altered variants emerging in the first half of "Let's Go Away for Awhile".)

Tertian modulations (by thirds) were frequently used. The use of major and minor submediants, which establish tonic–submediant (I–vi/VI) relationships in all key-shifting tracks except "God Only Knows", is cited by Lambert as another "important source of overall unity". (Note: This pattern begins in "Wouldn't It Be Nice", modulating from F to D, and recurs in tracks like "That's Not Me" (A to F♯ major) and "Let's Go Away for Awhile" (F to D). Side B continues the motif: "Pet Sounds" shifts to G major within B♭ while "Here Today" and "Caroline No" employ minor submediants. The sole exception is "God Only Knows", which modulates up a fourth instead of using submediant relations. Lambert adds that while submediant key relations were new to Wilson's "intra-album thematic" approach, earlier Beach Boys albums had featured diverse tonal shifts—one "specific precedent" being "Your Summer Dream" (1963)—and similar techniques had occasionally appeared in contemporaneous pop; however, for Wilson, influenced by jazz harmony, such progressions were habitual.) Author Jim Fusilli observes that Wilson frequently departs from and returns to the composition's "logic" to cement "emotional intent", but never "unbridled joy", as he had with "The Little Girl I Once Knew". Lambert locates this technique in Wilson's use of half-diminished seventh chords to impart dramatic tension in songs such as "Don't Talk" (on the word "eyes" in "I can see so much in your eyes") and "God Only Knows" (on the words "sure about it" and "livin' do me").

Wilson's bass lines were often chromatic and melodic while avoiding emphasis on the root note. Variations on a descending 1–5 pattern, a device he had applied in his earlier music, but not in work leading to Pet Sounds, recur in "Here Today", "Pet Sounds", and "I Just Wasn't Made for These Times". Lambert surmised that Wilson's rekindled interest in this device, which he had used on Surfin' Safari (1962) and Surfin' U.S.A. (1963), may have been inspired by the Beatles' "I'll Be Back" (1964).

== Production ==
=== Backing tracks ===
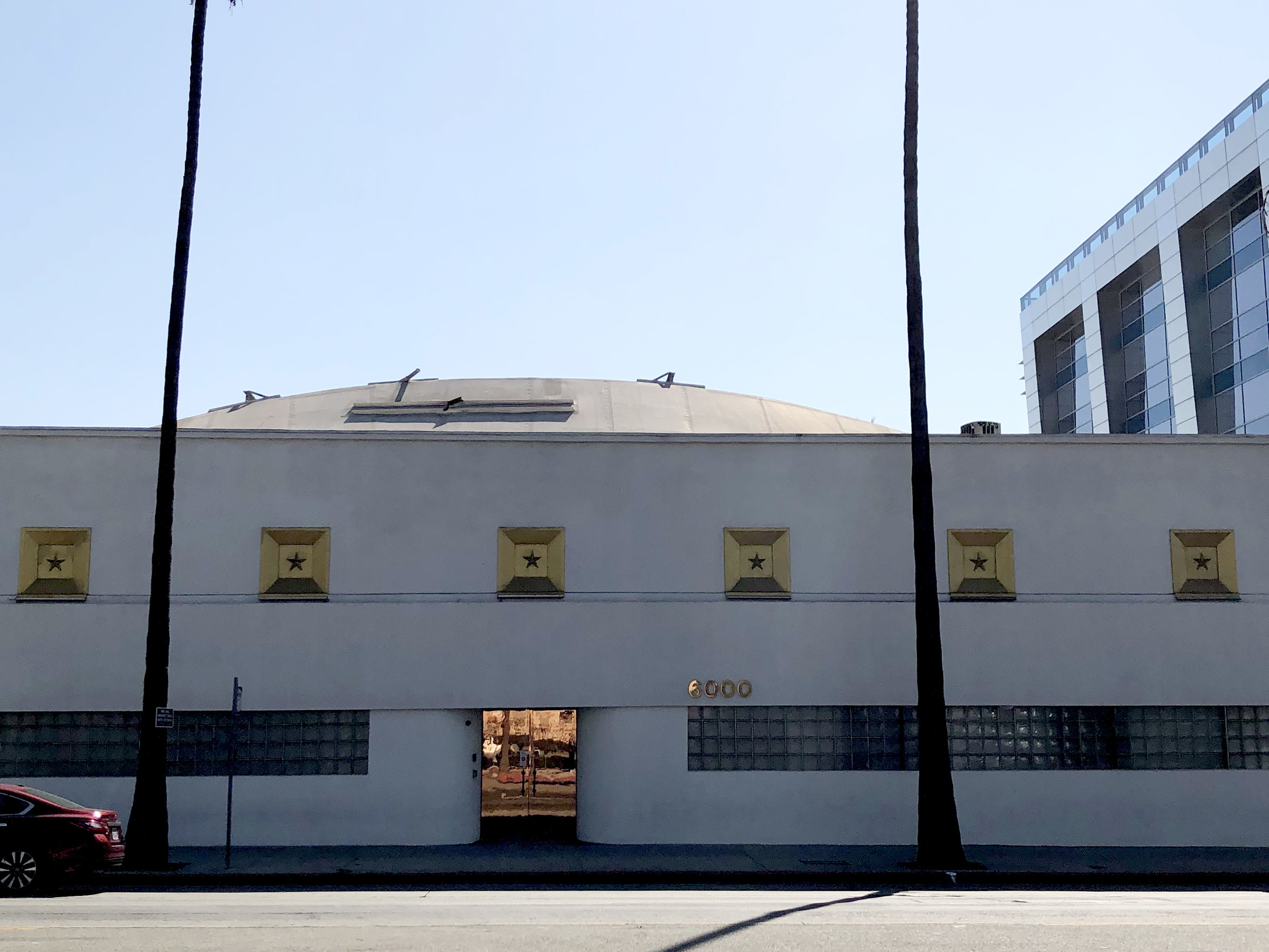
Former entrance of Western Studio on Sunset Boulevard (2019)

Recording for Pet Sounds primarily occurred between January 18 and April 13, 1966, across 27 sessions. "You Still Believe in Me" and "Pet Sounds" began earlier, while "Sloop John B" was partially recorded in July and December 1965. Most instrumental tracks were recorded at the United Western Recorders, while Gold Star Studios hosted sessions for "Good Vibrations" and the backing tracks of "Wouldn't It Be Nice" and "I Just Wasn't Made for These Times". Sunset Sound Recorders was used for the instrumental of "Here Today". Wilson produced the album largely with his usual engineer, Western staff member Chuck Britz. The unprecedented production costs totaled $70,000 (equivalent to $690,000 in 2025).

Since the 1963 Surfer Girl sessions, Wilson had integrated Spector's studio musician group, later known as "the Wrecking Crew", into his records. Regular participants included Hal Blaine (drums), Glen Campbell and Billy Strange (guitar), Al De Lory (piano), Steve Douglas (saxophone), Carol Kaye (Fender bass), Larry Knechtel (Hammond organ), Don Randi (piano), Lyle Ritz (upright bass), Ray Pohlman (bass and guitar), and Julius Wechter (percussion). He relied on these musicians to execute increasingly complex arrangements, especially as the band members were touring. Pet Sounds marked the first Beach Boys project in which he almost exclusively used these musicians for the backing tracks. Carl, who sporadically contributed guitar parts during sessions, reflected that the technical demands of the recordings had exceeded the group's collective abilities.

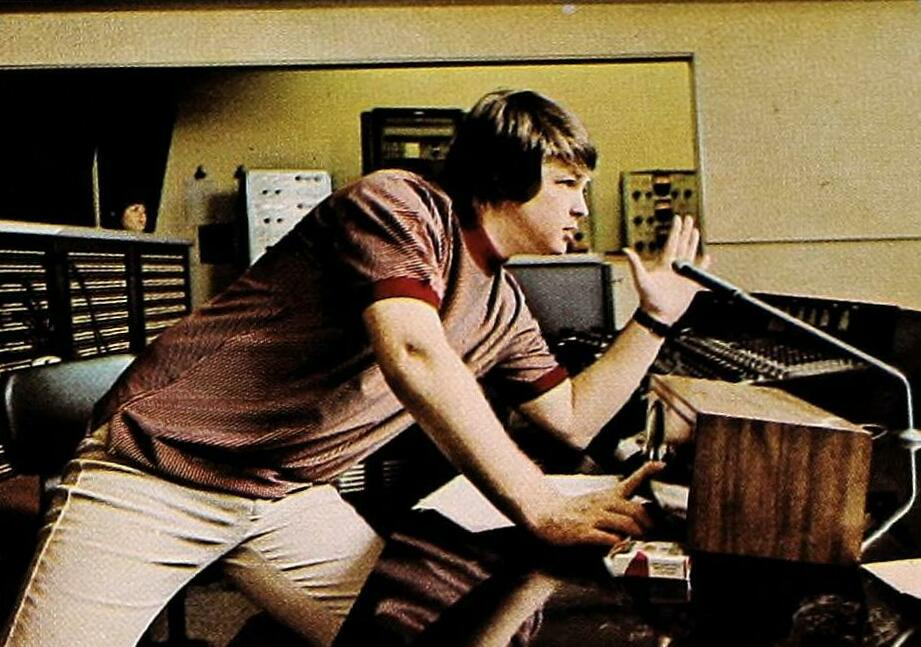
Wilson conducting a Pet Sounds session behind the mixing desk at Western

Backing track sessions typically lasted at least three hours. Britz recalled that most time was spent refining sounds, as Wilson knew which instruments he wanted and insisted on assembling all musicians simultaneously, despite financial impracticality. By layering instruments (such as multiple types of keyboards) playing in unison, slight tuning discrepancies between them produced a chorusing effect, unattainable through electronic means.

Wilson characterized himself as "sort of a square" around these musicians, starting with each instrument's sound individually, typically beginning with keyboards and drums, followed by violins if not overdubbed. Sessions lacked pre-rehearsals, and he usually arrived with only rudimentary musical drafts. (Note: Wilson retained his musical ideas mentally until recording sessions and rehearsed individual sections rather than full arrangements, leaving the musicians unfamiliar with complete songs until tracking began. Accordionist Frank Marocco recalled the process as initially chaotic, though Wilson consistently unified the elements to match his vision by the session's conclusion. Despite the seemingly improvised workflow, Wilson adhered to pre-session plans developed during hours of solitary piano work.) He typically composed full arrangements mentally but conveyed them through shorthand notation prepared by session musicians, with separate charts for different instrumental groups. His approach relied on their improvisational skills; instead of written scores, he hummed or vocalized parts during recording. Blaine recalled using handwritten chord charts, which Wilson photocopied for the group; they would adjust parts based on his feedback during takes. While maintaining creative control, he welcomed additional input and occasionally retained mistakes if he felt they enhanced the recording.

=== Reactions from bandmates ===
[...] it took us quite a while to adjust [...] because it wasn't music you could necessarily dance to—it was more like music you could make love to.

— Al Jardine

Pet Sounds is sometimes considered a Brian Wilson solo album, including by Wilson himself, who later called it "a chance to step outside the group and shine". Except for Love, who received phone previews of tracks, other band members were not consulted during production, though Brian had played excerpts to Dennis and Carl. Upon returning to the studio on February 9, the bandmates were presented with recordings that jarred with their expectations.

Critiques among the band members focused on lyrics rather than music, with concerns about replicating the complex arrangements live. Dennis dismissed rumors of dissent and stated that no member matched Brian's talent or opposed his vision. Carl rejected such reports as "bullshit" and declared there had been universal affection for the project. Love said his sole objection targeted the original lyrics of "I Know There's an Answer", while Jardine described Love as "very confused" by the album's direction, calling him a "formula hound" dependent on clear hooks.

Brian later remembered arguments about the project being "too arty". Marilyn stated that his bandmates had struggled "to understand what he was going through emotionally" while Asher stated the bandmates—especially Al, Dennis, and Mike—voiced objections such as "This isn't our kind of shit!" during tense sessions. Beyond this, he added that the bandmates never challenged Brian on his direction for the group, as they had felt they had lacked the talent to make such judgments. Love's objections centered on the album's suitability for the band's brand—reservations which Jardine shared—rather than artistic quality. Jardine was hesitant about the stylistic shift, but grew to appreciate it. In his 2016 memoir I Am Brian Wilson, Carl is stated to have embraced the album while Love and Dennis initially did not.

According to Brian in a 1976 interview, his bandmates were concerned that he might depart for a solo career. He acknowledged their resistance to his vocal prominence, calling it "more of a Brian Wilson album than a Beach Boys album." Love later wrote that he desired greater contributions and his "lead voice" in some songs. Brian conceded that tensions eased as the band accepted the project: "They let me have my little stint."

=== Overdubs and mixing ===
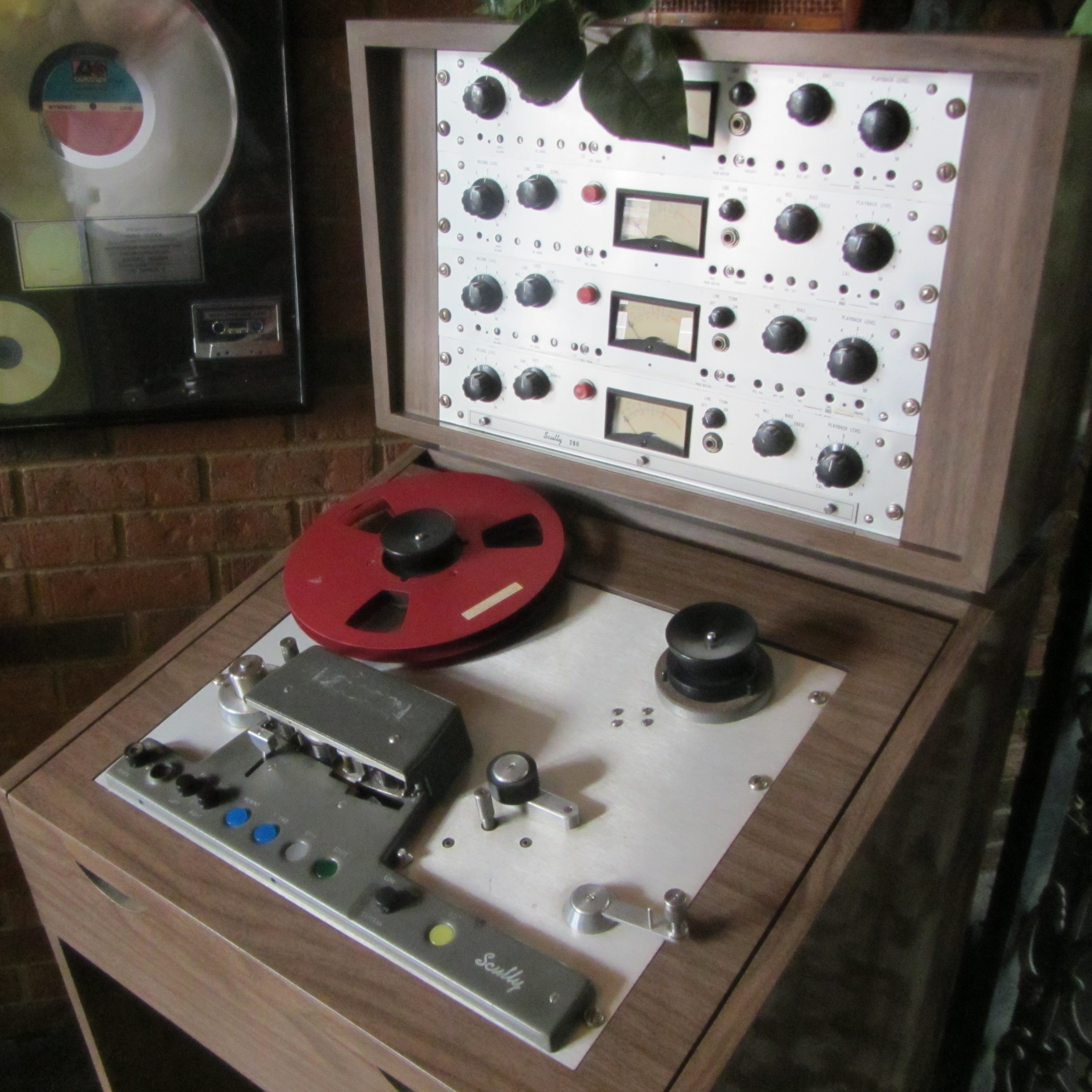
A Scully four-track 280 tape deck, identical to the model used for Pet Sounds

Wilson's mixing process faced considerable technical constraints, such as simultaneously recording overdubs while mixing existing tracks and combining multiple recordings into a single mono channel in real time, which risked unintended artifacts. Until 1996, the album lacked a true stereo mix due in part to the limitations involved with the recording logistics. Like Spector, Wilson deliberately mixed in mono, believing it offered a greater control over sound reproduction unaffected by variables in speaker placement or playback systems. At the time, most consumer equipment and broadcasts were monophonic; another factor was Wilson's near-total deafness in his right ear.

Tape effects were limited to slapback echo and reverb. Reverb was added live through the use of echo chambers, as was common in music production of the era. Wilson often isolated reverb on the timpani. Compared to Spector's Wall of Sound, Wilson's productions achieved greater complexity through his use of four-track and eight-track recording. While Spector recorded live ensemble takes in mono on three-track machines, Wilson employed a Scully four-track 288 tape recorder for initial backing tracks, then transferred them to eight-track. Instruments were grouped across three tracks: drums, percussion, and keyboards; horns; and bass with additional percussion and guitar. A fourth track held temporary reference mixes, later replaced by overdubs like strings. Once Wilson was satisfied, Britz provided a tape copy for him to take and evaluate.

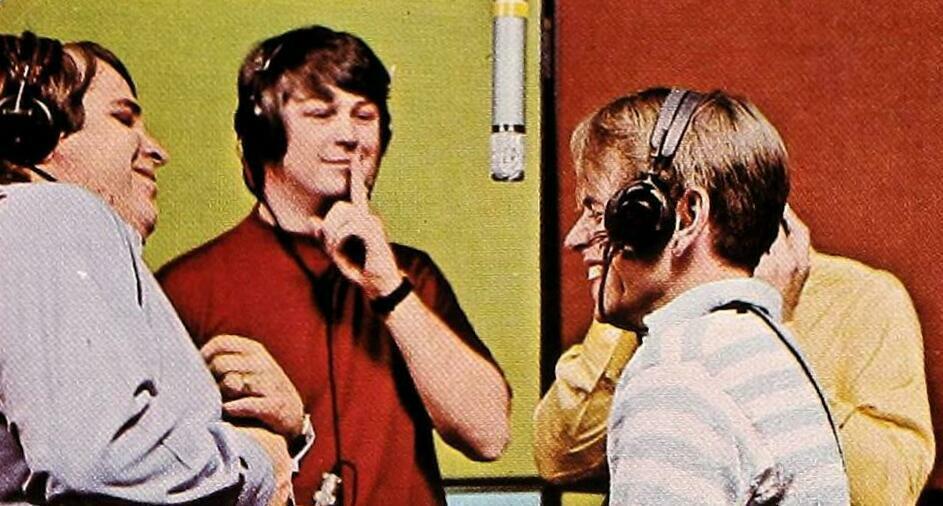
The Beach Boys recording vocals for Pet Sounds. From left: Carl, Brian, Jardine, and Johnston (obscured)

Vocal overdubs occurred at Western and CBS Columbia Square from February to April. Five songs were recorded at Columbia due to it being the sole Los Angeles facility equipped with eight-track technology. Brian allocated six tracks for individual vocals to refine balance during mixing; mono overdubs used eight-track recorders, with one channel reserved for supplementary layers.

The bandmates often arrived unprepared, with minimal rehearsal before singing. Requiring more precision from the vocal sessions than on any prior Beach Boys recording, Brian coached each member on their vocal parts at a piano. Following nightly playback sessions, they occasionally opted to re-record their performance. Love affectionately nicknamed Brian "dog ears" for his auditory sensitivity and insistence on a specific tonal and rhythmic characteristic, sometimes discarding completed tracks the next day to re-record them. Neumann U-47 (for Dennis, Carl, and Jardine) and Shure 545 microphones (for Brian's leads) were used, with Love requiring an additional microphone for his lower register.

Late overdubs around April 17 completed the album's principal recording. Mixing occurred within days in a single nine-hour session largely spent blending vocals with the pre-mixed mono instrumentals. The final mono mix contained numerous technical flaws contrasting with the refined arrangements and performances, alongside countertextural aspects gesturing toward the work's recorded nature. Saxophonist Steve Douglas recalled the draft mix as "real sloppy", and after he and the musicians confronted Wilson, "he took it back and mixed it properly. I think a lot of times, beautiful orchestrated stuff or parts got lost in his mixes." Among the most prominent examples, an audible tape splice occurs in "Wouldn't It Be Nice" between the chorus and Love's bridge vocal entrance, while a distant conversation was accidentally captured during the instrumental break of "Here Today" amid a vocal overdub. (Note: Granata posits Wilson "felt that performance and feeling outweighed technical perfection", akin to Spector's production ethos, and may have overlooked minor anomalies that were less noticeable on 1960s playback systems. Biographer David Leaf characterized such imperfections as "not sloppy recording, [but] part of the music".)

== Songs and instrumentals ==
=== Side one ===
"Wouldn't It Be Nice" portrays a young couple longing for adult independence. Asher cited it as the sole track for which he wrote lyrics to match Wilson's fully composed melody. Recording the band's vocals required more studio time than any other song, as they struggled with Wilson's performance standards.

"You Still Believe in Me" introduces recurring introspective themes, exploring self-awareness of personal shortcomings amid a partner's devotion. Wilson characterized the song as depicting a man's emotional vulnerability from an effeminate perspective. He and Asher crafted its introduction by plucking piano strings with a bobby pin.

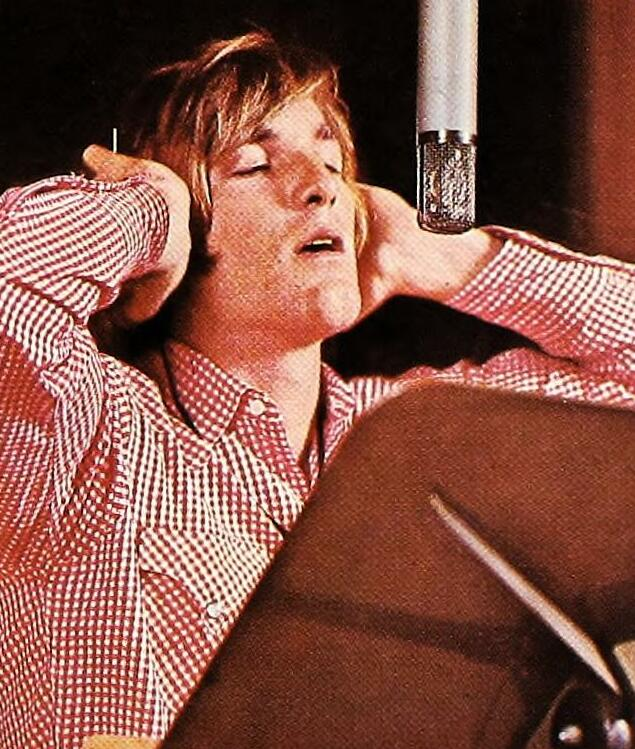
Dennis, whose drumming on the album was limited to "That's Not Me", contributed jazz patterns to the track

"That's Not Me", the track that most closely resembles a conventional rock song, features key modulations and mood shifts. It is the only track with most instrumental parts performed by the band members themselves. Its lyrics depict a young man's journey toward self-realization, concluding that companionship outweighs solitary ambition.

"Don't Talk (Put Your Head on My Shoulder)" is among the most harmonically complex of Wilson's songs, centering on non-verbal communication between lovers. Departing from his earlier work, Wilson incorporated a string sextet (violins, viola, and cello) to achieve an expressive tone.

"I'm Waiting for the Day" follows a protagonist attempting to comfort a guarded, emotionally wounded love interest. It blends jazz chords with doo-wop progressions and orchestral instrumentation. Originally registered as Brian's solo composition in 1964, it was later co-credited to Love, who made a minor adjustment to Brian's lyrics.

"Let's Go Away for Awhile" is the first instrumental, featuring 12 violins, four saxophones, piano, oboe, vibraphones, and a Coca-Cola bottle used as a guitar slide. Wilson considered the track to be "the finest piece of art" he had made up to that point, and one that may have been subconsciously influenced by Burt Bacharach's music. Musicologist Larry Starr references the piece's unusual AABCC structure as an example of the album's occasional formal experimentation.

Jardine proposed adapting the traditional Caribbean folk song "Sloop John B", which he knew from the Kingston Trio. Wilson's arrangement blended rock with marching band instrumentation, and he modified the original lyric from "this is the worst trip since I've been born" to "I've ever been on", possibly alluding to psychedelic experiences. He included "Sloop John B" at Capitol's insistence, anticipating commercial success from a single release.

=== Side two ===
Bridge of "God Only Knows"
The basic rhythmic feel of "God Only Knows" blends harpsichord, piano, sleigh bells, and strings with slapback echo. Lambert describes the song as the album's "musical high point".

"God Only Knows" depicts a narrator contemplating the end of a romantic relationship, asserting that life without their partner could only be fathomed by God. It challenged pop music conventions of the mid-1960s by explicitly referencing "God" in its title and lyrics, then considered taboo—at least one prior radio ban targeted a song containing words such as "hell" and "damn".

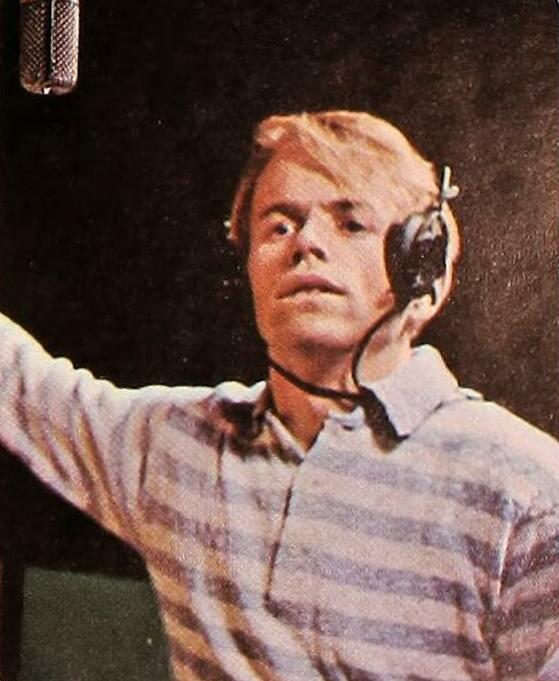
"I Know There's an Answer" featured a lead vocal from Jardine

"I Know There's an Answer", initially titled "Let Go Your Ego" and "Hang On to Your Ego", portrays an individual reluctant to advise others on their lifestyle. Its lyrics sparked internal controversy over perceived allusions to drug culture. (Note: Loren Schwartz, who introduced Wilson to LSD, later reflected that Wilson experienced "the full-on ego death. It was a beautiful thing.") Wilson stated that the chorus contained "an inappropriate lyric" which he dedicated much thought to revising, resulting in a song he later described as rejecting escapist LSD culture. The track feature a bass harmonica solo performed by session musician Tommy Morgan.

"Here Today" is narrated from an ex-boyfriend's perspective, warning of inevitable heartbreak in new relationships. Wilson described the track as an experiment in basslines, featuring a bass guitar played an octave higher as the lead instrument. It was the last song written for the album. Asher referred to the song as a "little more of me both lyrically and melodically than Brian."

"I Just Wasn't Made for These Times" addresses social alienation. Wilson described the song as depicting someone like himself "crying because he thought he was too advanced" and might "leave people behind". The instrumentation incorporates harpsichord, tack piano, flutes, temple blocks, timpani, and an Electro-Theremin performed by its inventor Paul Tanner. Lambert called the chorus vocals, constructed through repeat overdubbing, emblematic of his "progressive vision for the album".

The second instrumental track "Pet Sounds" was recorded early in the sessions. It contains a prominent bass descent from B♭ to F (through A♭, G, and G♭), which served as a motivic element and inspiration for subsequent tracks. Lambert interprets the track as a "musical synopsis" of the album's key themes and a reflective pause for the narrator following the emotional climax of "Here Today". The instrumental was originally titled "Run James Run" and written as a possible theme song for the James Bond film franchise; Wilson recalled, "It was supposed to be a James Bond-theme type of song. We were gonna try to get it to the James Bond people. But we thought it would never happen, so we put it on the album." For percussion, drummer Ritchie Frost tapped two empty Coca-Cola cans.

"Caroline, No" grapples with lost innocence. Wilson named the song as likely his best and described it as a melancholic reflection on irretrievable love. The album version of the track concludes with a fade-out consisting of Wilson's dogs barking alongside sounds of passing trains from a Capitol sound effects album.

== Leftover tracks and outtakes ==
"The Little Girl I Once Knew", which was recorded during the album's recording period, was initially released in November 1965 as a single. Writer Neal Umphred speculated that the song might have been considered for the LP and would have probably been included had the single been more commercially successful.

On October 15, 1965, Wilson recorded an instrumental titled "Three Blind Mice" with a 43-piece orchestra; unrelated to the nursery rhyme of the same name, it later debuted on the Beach Boys' 2011 compilation The Smile Sessions. The same day, he also recorded instrumental renditions of "How Deep Is the Ocean?" and "Stella by Starlight". Biographer Mark Dillon surmised these recordings were experimental exercises in capturing orchestral sounds, possibly preparing for the string ensemble used in "Don't Talk (Put Your Head on My Shoulder)", and likely never intended for release. Another instrumental, "Trombone Dixie", was recorded on November 1. Wilson dismissed it a quick arrangement made while "fuckin' around with the musicians". It was released as a bonus track on the 1990 reissue.

During late 1965, portions of the Pet Sounds sessions were dedicated to experimental endeavors, including an extended a cappella rendition of "Row, Row, Row Your Boat" that highlighted its round structure. As part of his experiments, Wilson recorded humorous skits and sound effects for a proposed psychedelic comedy album. At least two of these sketches—"Dick" and "Fuzz"—survive, featuring Wilson, a woman named Carol, and the Honeys. These remain officially unreleased.

Between February and March 1966, Wilson recorded "Good Vibrations", initially a co-authorship with Asher, who recalled the song originated from Capitol's demand for a new single. Wilson ultimately delivered "Sloop John B" and excluded "Good Vibrations" from the album, despite objections from the band.

== Sleeve design and title ==
The front cover depicts the band members—Carl, Brian, and Dennis, Love, and Jardine (left to right)—feeding apples to goats at the San Diego Zoo while wearing coats and sweaters. A green band header displays the artist name, album title, and track list, partially using the Cooper Black typeface. Johnston, who had joined the band unofficially, is absent due to contractual restraints with Columbia Records. The back cover includes a monochrome montage of the touring band performing onstage, posing in samurai attire during their Japan tour, and two images of Brian.

Wilson posing with a goat at the San Diego Zoo

In his memoir, Love wrote that Capitol had organized the cover shoot after proposing the album title Our Freaky Friends, with the animals representing the "freaky friends". Wilson later could not remember who suggested the zoo. Jardine recalled that Pet Sounds had already been selected as the title prior to the shoot, initially misunderstanding "pet" as slang for romantic encounters, attributing the final concept to Capitol's art department. Though some sources cite Remember the Zoo as a working title, this originated as a 1990s fan-created hoax.

External videos
- The Beach Boys Pet Sounds Shoot at San Diego Zoo 1966 on YouTube

The cover photo was taken on February 10, 1966, by photographer George Jerman. KFMB-TV reporters footage of this was lost until 2021. A San Diego Union report stated the group visited the zoo for their album Our Freaky Friends, with zoo staff initially objecting to the title but relenting when told animals were popular with teenagers. The Beach Boys had aimed to capitalize on this trend before the rock band the Animals, who had released an album titled Animal Tracks months earlier. The zoo banned the group, accusing them of mishandling animals, though this was later lifted.

Love recalled suggesting the title in a studio hallway, inspired by the zoo photos and animal sounds on the record. Carl recalled in 1996 that the title originated from Brian's concept of compiling his favorite "pet" sounds: "It was hard to think of a name for the album, because you sure couldn't call it Shut Down Vol. 3. (Note: In the 1990s, Brian attributed the title to Carl.) Brian, in the 1970s, told biographer Byron Preiss the album was named for "the dogs", and later suggested the name paid homage to Phil Spector through shared initials (PS). His 1991 memoir claims the title was inspired by Love dismissively asking, "Who's gonna hear this shit? The ears of a dog?"; Love denied this. Asher recalled disapproving the title when consulted by Wilson, feeling that it had "trivialized what we had accomplished".

== Release, promotion, and commercial performance ==
=== United States Capitol release ===
On March 7, Wilson's first solo record, the "Caroline No" single (B-side "Summer Means New Love" from Summer Days) was released, charting at number 32 during a seven-week stay. It ignited speculation about his departure from the Beach Boys. The Beach Boys' "Sloop John B" (B-side "You're So Good to Me" from Summer Days), issued March 21, reached number 3.

After completing Pet Sounds, Wilson played it for his wife, who later described the experience as profoundly moving and spiritual, recalling they both cried. Wilson worried its complexity might alienate listeners. Capitol staff reacted with confusion to its unconventional style. Producer Nick Venet believed Wilson was "screwing up", claiming he sought to gain industry attention and antagonize his father. Capitol A&R director Karl Engemann supported Wilson, recognizing the album's departure from the Beach Boys' earlier hits but swayed by Wilson's enthusiasm. Marketing personnel reportedly expressed disappointment. (Note: According to Love, "I was with Brian when we went up to Capitol to play the album for Karl. He was a heck of a nice guy, and even though he liked Pet Sounds a lot, he asked if we couldn't make more records like the old [surf] stuff.") The executives debated rejecting the album but approved it after several meetings, including one where Wilson used a tape recorder with pre-recorded answers to address concerns.

Pet Sounds was released on May 16, debuting at number 106 on the Billboard charts and initially selling 200,000 copies. In the U.S., it peaked at number 10 on July 2 and remained on the chart for ten months, a moderate performance compared to the band's earlier albums. Total sales were estimated at 500,000 units, but the RIAA did not grant it immediate gold certification—the first Beach Boys album since 1963 to lack it upon release.

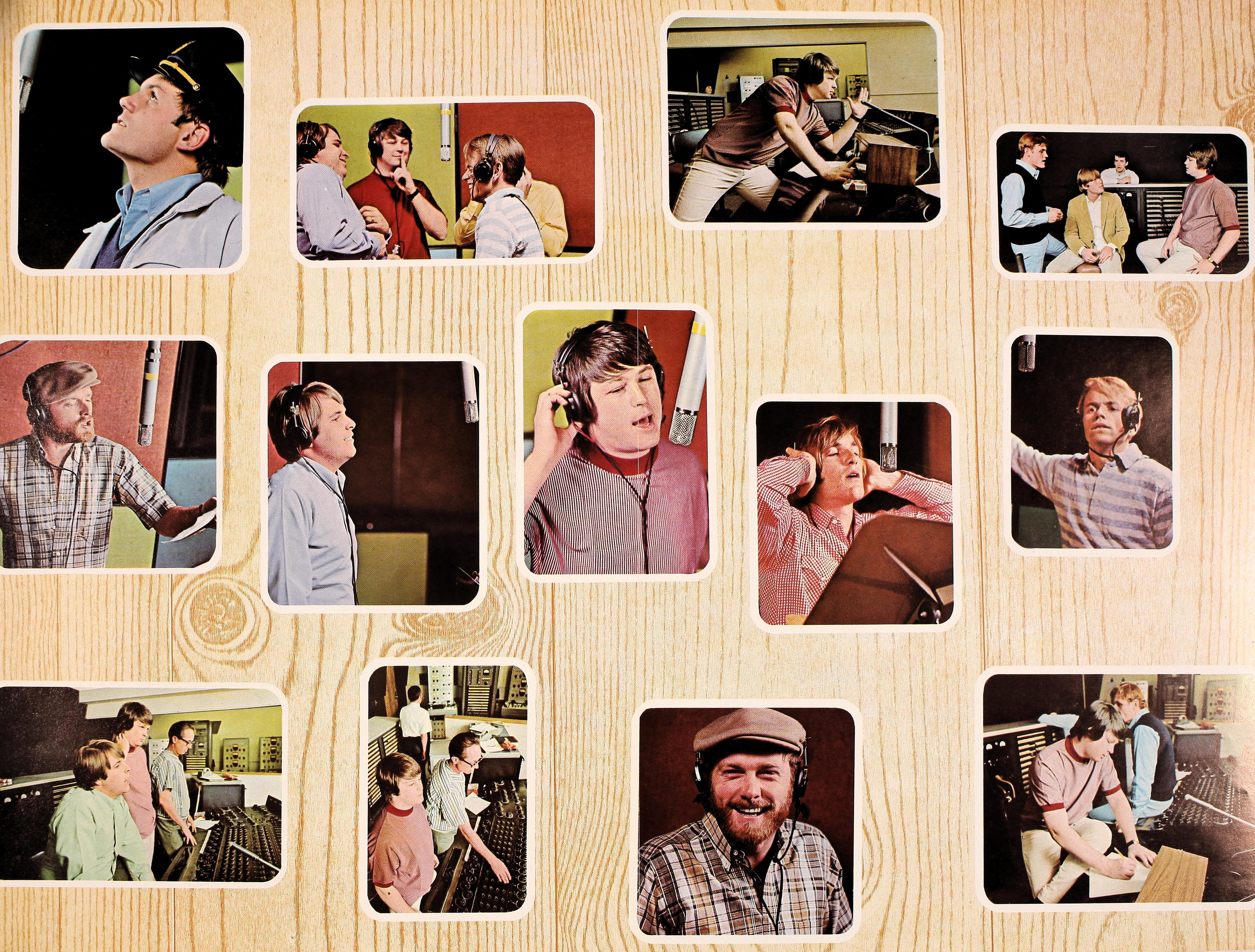
Advertisement for Pet Sounds, published in Cashbox magazine in May 1966. Dennis, Johnston, Melcher, Asher and Britz can also be seen.

Capitol's ad campaign included Billboard ads and radio spots that maintained the group's image without acknowledging the album's new direction. The radio spots featured comedy skits by the band that omitted musical excerpts, depending solely on name recognition. Johnston and Carl later criticized Capitol for insufficient promotion compared to past releases. Carl suggested the label relied on existing airplay. Capitol may have viewed the album as commercially risky, targeting older general audiences over their core demographic of younger women. Journalist Peter Doggett disputed claims of deliberate sabotage, which he called "a pop myth", and stated that Pet Sounds had been promoted as heavily as the Beach Boys' prior releases.

Two months after the album's release, Capitol issued the compilation Best of the Beach Boys, which earned rapid RIAA gold certification and further hindered Pet Sounds' commercial performance According to Engemann, the label's marketing team doubted Pet Sounds' commercial potential and sought to bolster quarterly sales. Contemporary reports state some stores received the compilation instead of Pet Sounds when ordered. On July 18, the single "Wouldn't It Be Nice" (B-side "God Only Knows") was released, peaking at number 8. Billboard later ranked the album at number 43 on its "Top Pop Albums of 1966" chart.

In 2000, Pet Sounds was certified gold and platinum by the RIAA based on verifiable sales data, though Capitol estimated total sales had exceeded two million copies. (Note: Capitol executive Mike Etchart speculated the album had likely reached double-platinum status (two million sales) in the U.S., attributing discrepancies to incomplete archival records and complications from licensing agreements with Warner Bros. in the late 1960s.) Certification required documented shipment records, which Capitol struggled to provide due to lost or scattered paperwork from 1966 to 1985. (Note: The label initially withdrew its certification request when unable to locate historical sales figures but later submitted partial data from the prior 15 years, resulting in a gold certification for approximately 670,000 units sold. RIAA awarded account for shipments to retailers, differing from SoundScan's tracking of individual sales, which reported 210,000 copies sold between 1991 and 2000.) In 2026, the RIAA certified the album as double platinum.

=== United Kingdom EMI release ===
Personally, I think the group has evolved another 800 per cent in the last year. We have a more conscious, arty production now that's more polished. It's all been like an explosion for us. [...] it's like I'm in the golden age of what it's all about.

— Brian Wilson quoted in Melody Maker, March 1966

Carl stated that while the Beach Boys recognized shifting industry trends, Capitol maintained a fixed perception of the group that conflicted with their desired presentation. In March, the band hired Nick Grillo as their manager after switching management firms and recruited Derek Taylor, the Beatles' former press officer, as their publicist. Taylor's reputation helped provide a credible external perspective on the band's evolving image and activities. Following Brian's complaints regarding public perception of his talents, Taylor championed him as "a genius" to rebrand and legitimize the group.

In the UK, the band experienced limited commercial success until March 1966, when "Barbara Ann" and Beach Boys Party! both reached number 2 on the Record Retailer charts. Two singles were issued in April: "Sloop John B" peaked at number 2, while "Caroline, No" did not chart. Capitalizing on their rising British popularity, the group filmed two music videos for Top of the Pops—one for "Sloop John B" and another for "God Only Knows"—with Taylor as director. (Note: The first video was shot at Brian's Laurel Way residence with Dennis as cameraman; the second, filmed near Lake Arrowhead, depicted the band (excluding Johnston) wearing grotesque horror masks while playing Old Maid.) Though intended to incorporate excerpts from "Wouldn't It Be Nice" and "Here Today", the BBC slightly edited the "God Only Knows" video to reduce runtime. The "Sloop John B" video debuted on April 28.

The band's British distributor EMI initially had no plans to release Pet Sounds in the UK but later scheduled a November release to coincide with the band's British tour. From May 16 to 21, Johnston and Taylor stayed at London's Waldorf Hotel to promote the album. Through London-based producer Kim Fowley's connections, guests including Beatles John Lennon and Paul McCartney and Who drummer Keith Moon attended repeated album playbacks in their suite. Fowley likened the event to the Beatles' 1964 arrival at LaGuardia Airport, describing Johnston as "Jesus Christ in tennis shoes" and the album as "the Ten Commandments". Moon facilitated Johnston's exposure on British television and introduced him to Lennon and McCartney.

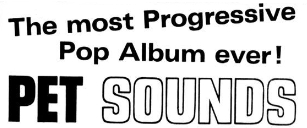
Text from a UK advertisement of the album. Public demand had led to Pet Sounds being issued several months earlier than scheduled.

EMI rush-released Pet Sounds in the UK on June 27 due to popular demand, where it peaked at number 2, behind the soundtrack album for The Sound of Music, remaining in the top ten for six months. Taylor is recognized as instrumental in this success due to his connections with the Beatles and other British industry figures. The UK music press carried advertisements calling Pet Sounds "The Most Progressive Pop Album Ever!" while Rolling Stones manager Andrew Loog Oldham—the Beach Boys' UK publisher—purchased a full-page Melody Maker advertisement declaring it "the greatest album ever made". The third UK single, "God Only Knows" (B-side "Wouldn't It Be Nice"), was released on July 22 and reached number 2.

Pet Sounds became one of the five bestselling UK albums of 1966. Capitalizing on the success of Beach Boys singles, EMI issued multiple existing Beach Boys albums in the UK market, including Party!, Today!, and Summer Days. Best of the Beach Boys spent five weeks at number 2 through year's end. By the final quarter of 1966, the Beach Boys surpassed British acts like the Beatles as the UK's top-selling album artists.

== Initial reactions ==
In the U.S., early reviews of Pet Sounds varied from negative to cautiously favorable. Billboard called the album an "exciting, well-produced LP" with "two superb instrumental cuts" and highlighted "Wouldn't It Be Nice" in a belated review. While American critics had offered sporadic praise for the album, some fans spread word to avoid the "weird" new Beach Boys release.

Conversely, British music journalists had an overwhelmingly favorable response, due in part to the promotional efforts. Rolling Stone founder Jann Wenner recalled that many British fans viewed the Beach Boys as surpassing the Beatles. Disc and Music Echo critic Penny Valentine praised the album as "Thirteen tracks of Brian Wilson genius", describing it as "sad little wistful songs about lost love and found love and all-around love". Norman Jopling of Record Mirror reported that the LP had been widely praised and uncriticized, writing that his only complaint with the album was "terribly complicated and cluttered" arrangements, suspecting it would primarily appeal to existing fans. A contrasting review in Disc and Music Echo argued the album would attract "thousands of new fans", declaring that it elevated the group's previously uneven output.

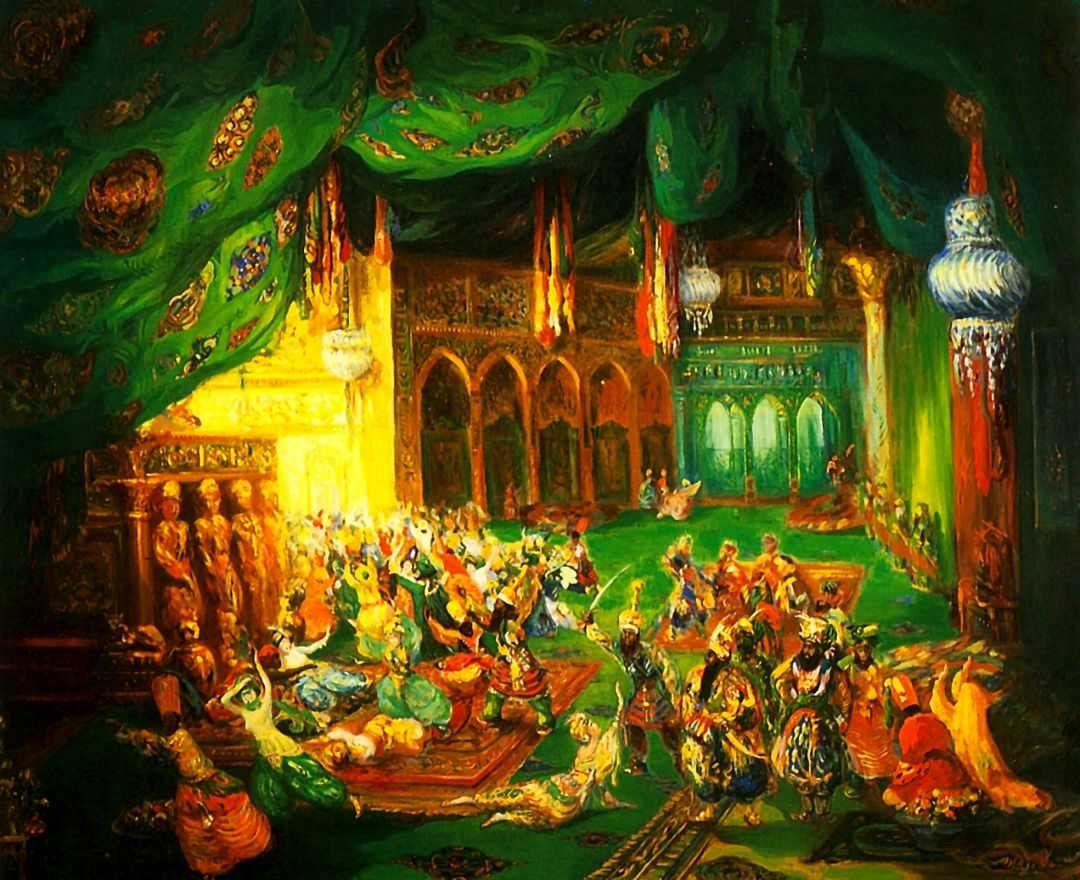
Record producer Andrew Loog Oldham lauded Pet Sounds in 1966 as "the pop equivalent" of Rimsky-Korsakov's 1888 symphony Scheherazade.

Melody Maker surveyed musicians on whether Pet Sounds was revolutionary or "as sickly as peanut butter" and concluded the album had a considerable impact on artists and industry figures. Spencer Davis of the Spencer Davis Group stated he became a fan of the Beach Boys after repeated listens of the album, calling Wilson a great producer. Eric Clapton, then with Cream, said his band loved the album and deemed Wilson "a pop genius". Three of nine respondents—Keith Moon, Manfred Mann's Mike d'Abo, and Scott Walker of the Walker Brothers—disagreed that it was revolutionary. D'Abo and Walker preferred the Beach Boys' earlier work, as did journalist and television presenter Barry Fantoni, who favored Today! and said Pet Sounds was "probably revolutionary, but I'm not sure that everything that's revolutionary is necessarily good". Moon's bandmate Pete Townshend criticized the album as tailored for "feminine" audiences, although later praised "God Only Knows".

Mick Jagger of the Rolling Stones disliked the album's songwriting, despite enjoying the record and its harmonies, while John Lennon praised Wilson's work. At the end of 1966, Melody Maker declared Pet Sounds and the Beatles' Revolver joint recipients of its "Pop Album of the Year" honor; its panel had deadlocked before compromising on the dual selection.

== Smile and spiritual successors ==
Wilson later stated that while Pet Sounds was well received in Britain, he viewed its underperformance in the U.S. as a public rejection of his artistry. His wife recalled that the tepid response "destroyed Brian", causing him to lose faith in music. Reflecting on his brother's disappointment, Carl described making the album as like "going to church" and lamented that Brian missed experiencing its British success during the band's late 1966 UK tour. (Note: Asher recalled that neither he nor Brian initially regarded Pet Sounds as a "masterpiece", stating he was primarily impressed by its production and viewed it as a way to demonstrate rock's potential as a mature art form to figures like his parents and advertising colleagues. Taylor stated that Wilson had remained unfazed by the album's commercial performance, instead focusing on surpassing contemporaries such as the Beatles and the Rolling Stones.)

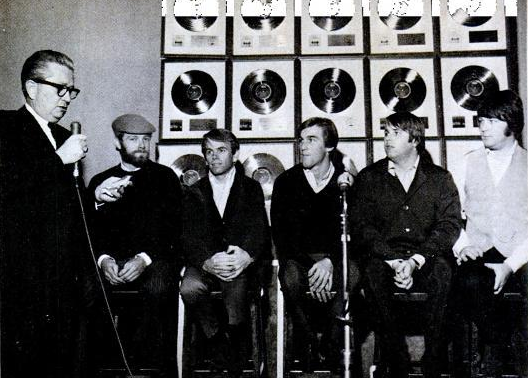
The Beach Boys accepting a gold record sales certification for "Good Vibrations" at the Capitol Tower (December 1966)

Through the remainder of 1966, Wilson collaborated with lyricist Van Dyke Parks on Smile, an unfinished album Wilson described as "a teenage symphony to God" intended to surpass Pet Sounds. (Note: Music journalist Noel Murray suggests the single's success helped clarify Wilson's artistic ambitions for listeners initially perplexed by the "un-hip orchestrations and pervasive sadness" in Pet Sounds.) As his mental health declined, his participation in the Beach Boys diminished, prompting the group to release subsequent albums that were less ambitious and received little critical attention. Wilson, in 1976, cited the band's 1968 release Friends as his second "solo album" after Pet Sounds. It was a commercial failure, leading the group's fanbase to abandon "any hope that [he] would deliver a true successor", according to a Mojo contributor.

Wilson attempted several professional comebacks in subsequent years, including the 1977 album The Beach Boys Love You, which marked his brief return as the group's primary songwriter and vocalist. He regarded it as a spiritual successor to Pet Sounds, citing its autobiographical lyrics and his feeling of creative satisfaction. In 1988, he released debut solo album Brian Wilson, aiming to revisit the sensibilities of Pet Sounds. Co-producer Russ Titelman promoted it as "Pet Sounds '88". It included "Baby Let Your Hair Grow Long", a thematic follow-up to "Caroline, No".

The Beach Boys rerecorded "Caroline, No" with Timothy B. Schmit, featuring a new multi-part vocal arrangement, for their 1996 album Stars and Stripes Vol. 1. Following the album's release, tentative plans emerged for a project biographer Mark Dillon dubbed Pet Sounds, Vol. 2, which would have involved the band collaborating with Sean O'Hagan of the High Llamas. Despite interest from record companies, the project was never realized. Later in the 1990s, Wilson and Asher resumed their songwriting partnership, composing at least four songs; only "This Isn't Love" and "Everything I Need" were released.

== Cultural impact and influence ==
=== Popular music and record production ===
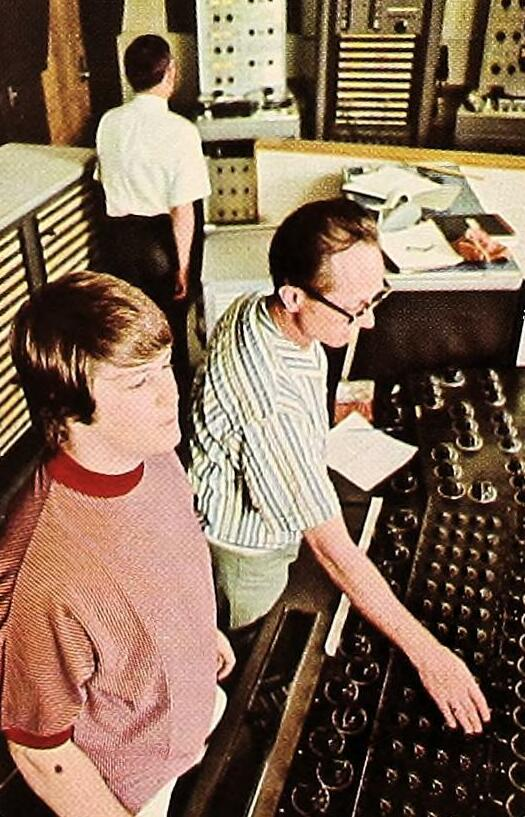
Wilson usurped standard studio protocols of the era that limited console use to assigned engineers.

Commentators often consider Pet Sounds to be one of the greatest and most influential albums, typically acknowledging its ambition, innovative studio production techniques, and high compositional standards. The album solidified Wilson's reputation for pioneering studio craftsmanship with its attention to detail at a level unprecedented in popular music; he wrote, arranged, and produced the album with control over every phase of its creation, an approach that Granata credits as redefining the role of record producers. While many artists previously served as their own producers, Wilson became the first major pop artist to oversee all aspects of an album's production. According to author Virgil Moorefield, Wilson built on the precedent of Leiber and Stoller by seeking to realize the full potential of the recording studio and effectively "composing at the mixing board"; as both songwriter and producer, he was involved in every detail of the sound production, making impromptu decisions about notes, articulation, and timbre, thereby merging the roles of composer, arranger, and producer—a model later adopted industry-wide.

Despite limited initial commercial success, its impact was immediate and far-reaching, later influencing artists across rock, pop, hip-hop, jazz, electronic, experimental, and punk. Lenny Waronker, then a staff producer at Warner Bros. Records, said that Pet Sounds elevated studio artistry among West Coast artists. In the UK it signaled a new level of creative ambition for pop while numerous groups furthered their exploration of experimental recording techniques. (Note: English record producer Bobby Irwin felt that Wilson's integration of songwriting, arranging, and studio experimentation set a new precedent, stating that "no one was doing what Brian was doing" in the contemporary pop landscape.) "God Only Knows" is frequently praised as one of the greatest songs ever written; historian John Robert Greene, in his 2010 book America in the Sixties, credited it with redefining the popular love song.

The album's production techniques remained common in modern music production through the 2010s. Composer Philip Glass compared its legacy to that of the Beatles' and Pink Floyd's recordings, and felt that the album's "structural innovation", incorporation of classical elements in arrangements, and novel "production concepts", with hindsight, clarified its status as a defining work of its era. Atlantic contributor Jason Guriel argued that it marked popular music's first extended exploration of auteurism.

=== Rock, psychedelic, and progressive music ===
Pet Sounds established a new benchmark for production and musical sophistication in the rock genre, according to musicologist John Covach. Greene positioned Pet Sounds as among the principal contributor to rock music trends after 1965. (Note: Greene further cites songs such as "Good Vibrations", Jefferson Airplane's "White Rabbit" and Jimi Hendrix's "Purple Haze" as later works influenced by the experimental trajectories initiated by Pet Sounds and the Beatles' "Tomorrow Never Knows". Cue magazine reflected in 1971 that Pet Sounds anticipated trends that were not widespread in rock music until 1969–1970. In 1971, publication Beat Instrumental & International Recording wrote: "Pet Sounds took everyone by surprise. In terms of musical conception, lyric content, production and performance, it stood as a landmark in a music genre whose development was about to begin snowballing.") Later discussions of the greatest albums of all time frequently cite Pet Sounds alongside the Beatles' Revolver and Bob Dylan's Blonde on Blonde, released later that year. (Note: Liel Leibovitz described Pet Sounds and Blonde on Blonde as "two strands in the same conversation" that briefly transformed American popular music into "a religious movement".) Among critics, Geoffrey Himes argued that Wilson's innovative harmonies and timbres were as impactful as Dylan's incorporation of irony into rock lyrics. Charlie Gillett felt that the album's "naïve innocence" diverged from skeptical contemporary works by Dylan, the Beatles, and the Rolling Stones, whereas Jon Savage saw that Pet Sounds contrasted the Rolling Stones' "icy mod cool" with its personal vulnerability. Velvet Underground co-founder John Cale called Pet Sounds "adult and childlike at the same time."

Wilson's pioneering use of doubling for virtually every instrument in Pet Sounds marked its first use in rock music. "I Just Wasn't Made for These Times" was the first piece in popular music to incorporate the Electro-Theremin, and the first rock piece to feature theremin-like sounds. The album is also cited as a precursor to synthesizer adoption; music writer Jeff Nordstedt contends that Wilson's layered instrumental combinations, achieved without electronic tools, foreshadowed and "fueled the drive toward" the synthesizer's capacity to unify organic tones into novel timbres. Pet Sounds marked the first instance of a rock group abandoning the conventional small-ensemble format for an entire album. Music journalist Tim Sommer suggests that while other artists had occasionally diverged from this format for individual songs, the Beach Boys' work was unprecedented in creating a full-length album that could not be replicated by a typical four- or five-member amplified group.

Pet Sounds had a lot to do with Sgt. Pepper. I remember talking to Paul McCartney and a couple guys and they were saying, "Sorry we ripped you off."

— Dennis Wilson, 1977

Rock historians frequently link Pet Sounds to the Beatles' 1967 Sgt. Pepper's Lonely Hearts Club Band. Paul McCartney often cited Pet Sounds as his favorite album and "God Only Knows" as "the greatest song ever written". He declared in 1990 that "no one is educated musically 'til they've heard that album" and credited it as an influence on his increasingly melodic bass-playing style, Sgt. Pepper, and his composition "Here, There and Everywhere" . (Note: According to Larry Starr, the "historical importance" of Pet Sounds is "certified" by McCartney's admission that it served as "the single greatest influence" on Sgt. Pepper. John Covach states that "Pet Sounds "prodded the Beatles to experiment more radically" with Sgt. Pepper, while David Howard writes, "Undeniably, the song-cycle construction of Pet Sounds was the catalyst" for the Beatles' album. Shared musical features adopted from Pet Sounds included upper-register bass lines, a larger emphasis on floor toms, and more eclectic and unorthodox instrument combinations. Lambert observes that the structural key relationships in Pet Sounds parallel those Walter Everett identified in Sgt. Pepper, particularly the recurring use of B♭ as a tonic key in four of six songs within the album's latter half.) Producer George Martin stated that Wilson challenged the Beatles, adding that "Without Pet Sounds [...] Sgt. Pepper wouldn't have happened." (Note: George Harrison reflected that the group had felt threatened by the album. Asked in 1966 for the musical person he most admired, Lennon named Wilson. Singer Tony Rivers recalled "talking to John for about 20 minutes at the NEMS Enterprises Christmas party one year. And the main part of the conversation was the Beach Boys, and how great they were." According to musician Lenie Colacino, McCartney "didn't start using the upper register on his Rickenbacker bass until after he heard Pet Sounds. The bass parts for 'Here Today' directly influenced the way Paul played on 'With a Little Help' and 'Getting Better'." Granata writes that, by the time the Beatles recorded Magical Mystery Tour (November 1967), "it was clear they'd fully assimilated the essence of Brian's eclectic arranging style.") The Beach Boys' rivalry with the Beatles was significant in advancing psychedelic music, as both groups pushed the boundaries of rock's stylistic and compositional range, inspiring later artists. (Note: According to Jones, the interplay between the two bands during this era remains one of the most noteworthy episodes in rock history.) Scholar Philip Auslander supports that, although psychedelic music is not typically associated with the Beach Boys, the album's experimental nature was instrumental in creating opportunities for psychedelic acts to gain broader recognition. (Note: DeRogatis places the album among the earliest psychedelic masterpieces, alongside Revolver and The Psychedelic Sounds of the 13th Floor Elevators (October 1966). Psychedelic albums sometimes regarded as "the British Pet Sounds" include the Zombies' Odessey and Oracle (1968) and Billy Nicholls' Would You Believe (1968).)

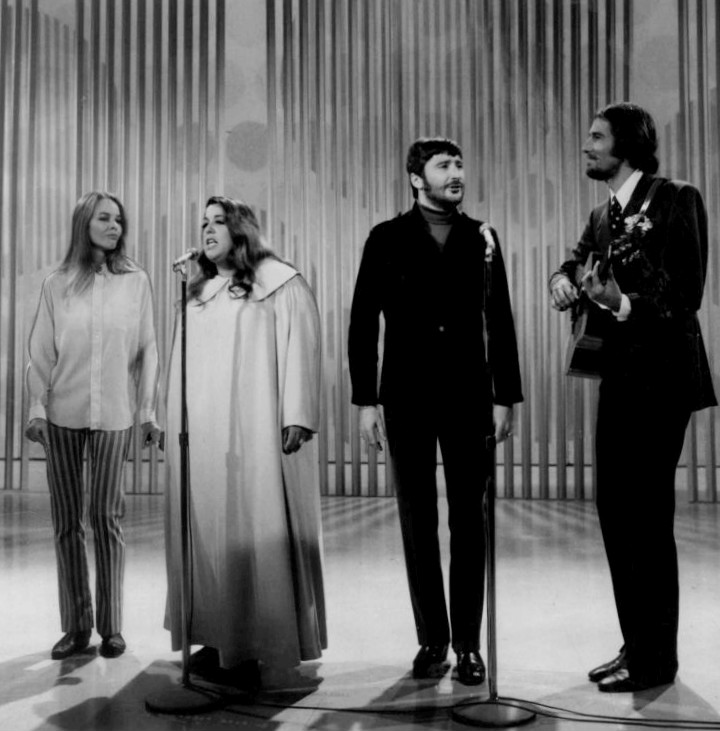
Pet Sounds shaped soft rock and orchestral pop, including such acts as the Mamas and the Papas (pictured), the Association, and the 5th Dimension.

Pet Sounds influenced numerous artists and producers in Los Angeles' orchestral pop scene. According to music writer Noel Murray, while the Beach Boys' music diverged from the subsequent sunshine pop movement—a retrospective label for music originally categorized as "soft pop" or "soft rock"—the record's orchestration techniques were widely emulated by producers. Music historian Bob Stanley identifies Pet Sounds and Sgt. Pepper as foundational to soft rock, citing their use of instrumentation, found sounds, and avoidance of traditional rock dynamics. Acts like Harpers Bizarre, the Association, and the Mamas and the Papas expanded this approach; their styles informed subsequent groups such as the 5th Dimension and Free Design, whose music was later termed "sunshine pop". Jimmy Webb, who penned songs for several of these groups, cited Pet Sounds as a benchmark work, declaring, "There's no way I can overemphasize its importance to us, in terms of inspiration and our development." Collaborating with former Beach Boys lyricist Gary Usher, Association producer Curt Boettcher applied the Pet Sounds aesthetic to Sagittarius' 1968 release Present Tense. (Note: Bruce Johnston, Terry Melcher, and Glen Campbell were among contributors to the recording of Present Tense.)

The juxtaposition of upbeat music with underlying moods of melancholy and longing, exemplified by "Wouldn't It Be Nice", became core elements of the power pop genre. Chicago Reader's Noah Berlatsky posited that the Beach Boys helped bridge a gap between the pop harmonizing and "melancholy" of the Drifters and the "psychedelic" experimentation of the Chi-Lites, influencing the development of smooth soul. The album's impact extended to the mid-1970s subgenre later dubbed "yacht rock", retroactively applied to soft rock characterized by jazz-influenced arrangements, introspective lyrics, and apolitical themes; in particular, the track "Sloop John B" is frequently cited as a precursor to the genre's occasional nautical themes.

Pet Sounds helped establish the album as a primary format for rock music. (Note: According to critic Gary Graff, the album was key to ushering in the "album era" of the late 1960s, alongside Dylan's Highway 61 Revisited (1965) and Blonde on Blonde, whereas Stanley cites Pet Sounds alongside The Freewheelin' Bob Dylan (1963) and Rubber Soul.) Though Rubber Soul had recently popularized the idea of cohesive albums over collections of singles, it largely maintained fidelity to the live ensemble sound. Wilson expanded its "album-centered" approach by crafting music that wholly transcended traditional rock instrumentation. (Note: Hoskyns contrasted Pet Sounds with Rubber Soul, stating that while the latter signaled pop music's maturation, Pet Sounds represented a "quantum leap into the unknown".) It influenced producer Tony Clarke's orchestral-rock fusion on the Moody Blues' Days of Future Passed (1967). By 1968, the Los Angeles Times reported that Wilson had become a leading figure in "art rock" following Pet Sounds. (Note: Asked in a 1968 interview about the Beatles' role in rock's "progress toward an art form", Led Zeppelin founder Jimmy Page responded, "I think the Beach Boys tried to do it first. I think there were lots of Beach Boy things on the Revolver album. Especially, the vocal harmony. Wilson really said a lot in his Pet Sounds album." Pet Sounds is viewed as the first work of art rock by Leaf, Jones, and Frith. Rolling Stone writers described the album as heralding the art rock of the 1970s. Academic Michael Johnson said that the album was one of the first documented moments of ascension in rock music. Bill Holdship said that it was "perhaps rock's first example of self-conscious art".)

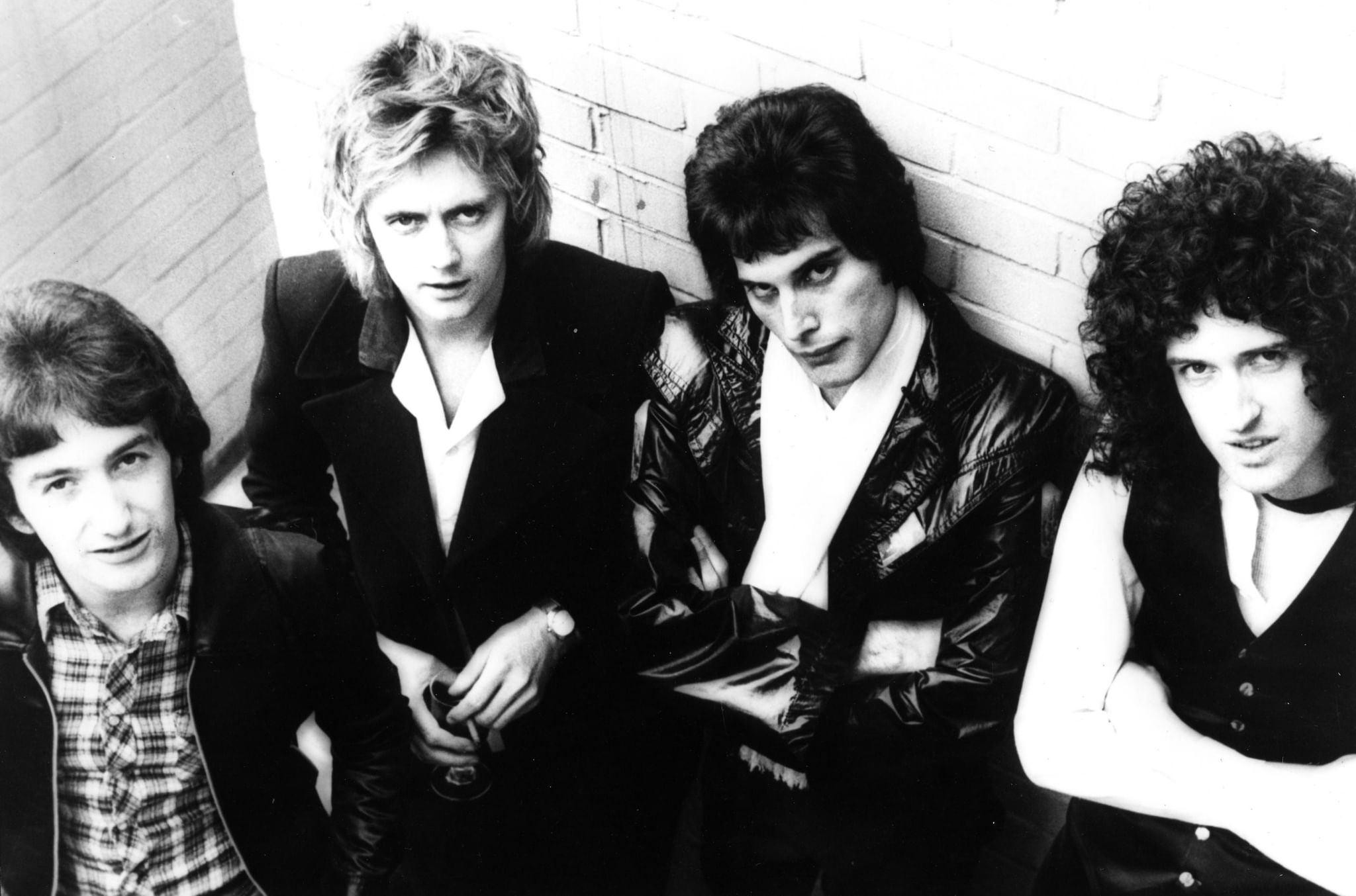
Pet Sounds anticipated the progressive pop of bands like Queen (pictured) and Supertramp.

The album contributed to the emergence of progressive pop, a genre that preceded progressive rock; journalist Troy Smith later referred to "Wouldn't It Be Nice" as "the first taste of progressive pop" subsequently elaborated upon by bands such as Queen and Supertramp. Ryan Reed, writing for Tidal, referenced the album's incorporation of non-rock instruments, alongside intricate key changes and vocal harmonies, as integral to the progressive pop genre. Bill Martin, an author of books about progressive rock, described the album as a turning point in rock's evolution from dance-oriented music to a more complex listening experience, marked by innovations in harmony, instrumentation, and studio technology. Covach states that Pet Sounds and subsequent Beach Boys and the Beatles recordings legitimized rock as a serious art form, prompting record labels to enable more experimental approaches among other artists.

By the early 1970s, there was a growing preference among rock record consumers for self-contained artists over collaboration, as orchestration became associated with older generations. (Note: According to Stanley, though works such as Pet Sounds, Sgt. Pepper, and Webb's "MacArthur Park" (1968) had offered potential blueprints for 1970s music, their approaches were later "junked" by the music world at large.) By the mid-1970s, more melody-focused songwriters adapted the progressive rock genre for mainstream radio. Musician and journalist Andy Gill suggested that Pet Sounds ultimately inspired rock bands to "get clever" and experiment with orchestration and time signatures.

=== Indie/alternative music and continued impact ===
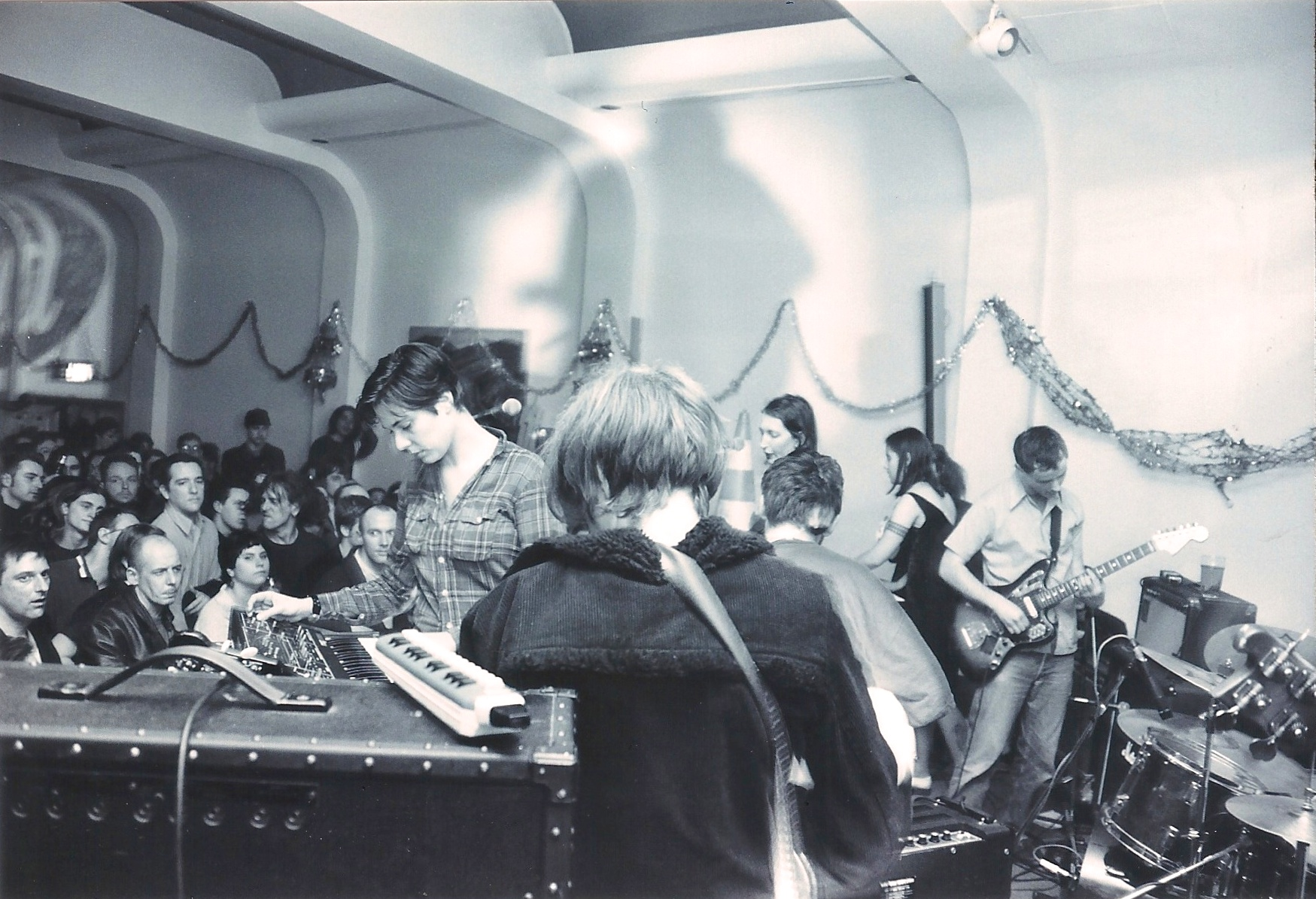
Stereolab (pictured 1994) were among many bands of the 1990s indebted to Pet Sounds' influence

By the 1990s, Pet Sounds had become a major influence on indie pop, with Wilson described as a "godfather" to indie musicians influenced by his melodic sensibilities, studio experimentation, and chamber orchestrations. "Chamber pop" also emerged as a genre founded on the album's musical template. (Note: In addition to "chamber pop", critics and enthusiasts have sometimes described the orchestral-rock fusion style epitomized by Pet Sounds using terms such as symphonic pop and ork-pop (short for "orchestral pop").)

During the mid-1990s, underground artists including Cardinal, the High Llamas, Yum-Yum, and members of the Elephant 6 collective drew inspiration from the album's arrangements, spurring a movement termed "ork-pop". Sean O'Hagan of the High Llamas, characterized by DeRogatis as "the most Pet Sounds-obsessed" of these musicians, channeled its orchestrated approach. Robert Schneider of the Apples in Stereo and Jim McIntyre of Von Hemmling founded Pet Sounds Studio, which served as the venue for numerous Elephant 6 projects by Neutral Milk Hotel and the Olivia Tremor Control. The album has been cited as a precursor to emo music, with writer Sean Cureton identifying parallels in the introspective themes of Weezer's Pinkerton (1996) and Death Cab for Cutie's Transatlanticism (2003). (Note: Music critic Ernest Simpson and Wild Nothing's Jack Tatum have called Pet Sounds "the first emo album", with Simpson referring to "I Just Wasn't Made for These Times" in particular. Luke Britton of the BBC dismissed these characterizations, writing that emo's widely recognized origins trace to 1980s hardcore punk acts.)

Radiohead's 1997 album OK Computer was intended to evoke an initially "shocking" quality similar to that of Pet Sounds, according to Thom Yorke. Collaborating with O'Hagan and Elephant 6 members, Cornelius' Fantasma, released a few months later, explicitly homaged Pet Sounds. In 1998, Lester cited the High Llamas, Saint Etienne, Stereolab, Air, Kid Loco, and Lewis Taylor among "today's most interesting acts" drawing on Wilson's songwriting as part of a broader "electronic pop" category. The Japanese release Smiling Pets was one of the earliest tribute albums dedicated to Pet Sounds, including contributions from Seagull Screaming Kiss Her Kiss Her and Melt Banana. (Note: Further tribute albums have included Do It Again: A Tribute to Pet Sounds (2005), The String Quartet Tribute to the Beach Boys' Pet Sounds (2006), MOJO Presents Pet Sounds Revisited (2012), and A Tribute to Pet Sounds (2016).) Jim Fusilli's 2005 book on the album was translated to Japanese by novelist Haruki Murakami. In 2007, producer Bullion created a J Dilla mashup of the album, Pet Sounds: In the Key of Dee. (Note: Hip-hop producer Questlove recalled that the Beach Boys had been unfashionable among black teenagers in the 1980s, and in the late 1990s, Detroit hip-hop artists including J Dilla mocked his admiration for Pet Sounds before later recognizing its merits.) The 2014 Brian Wilson biopic Love & Mercy included a substantial depiction of the album's making.

To honor the album's 50th anniversary, 26 artists contributed to a Pitchfork retrospective on its enduring influence, including comments from members of Talking Heads, Yo La Tengo, Chairlift, and Deftones, among others. PopMatters contributor Danilo Castro acknowledged the album had "restructured the landscape of modern music in its image", with its influence extending to David Bowie, Bruce Springsteen, the Flaming Lips, Kanye West, Fleet Foxes, and Frank Ocean. (Note: Additional musicians who have praised Pet Sounds have included Burt Bacharach, Carole King, Roger McGuinn, Randy Newman, Jeff Beck, David Gilmour, Daryl Hall, Elton John, Alice Cooper, Jackson Browne, Eric Carmen, Lindsey Buckingham, Ann Wilson, Tom Petty, Stephen Bishop, Elvis Costello, Billy Idol, and Gustavo Dudamel.)

== Live performances ==
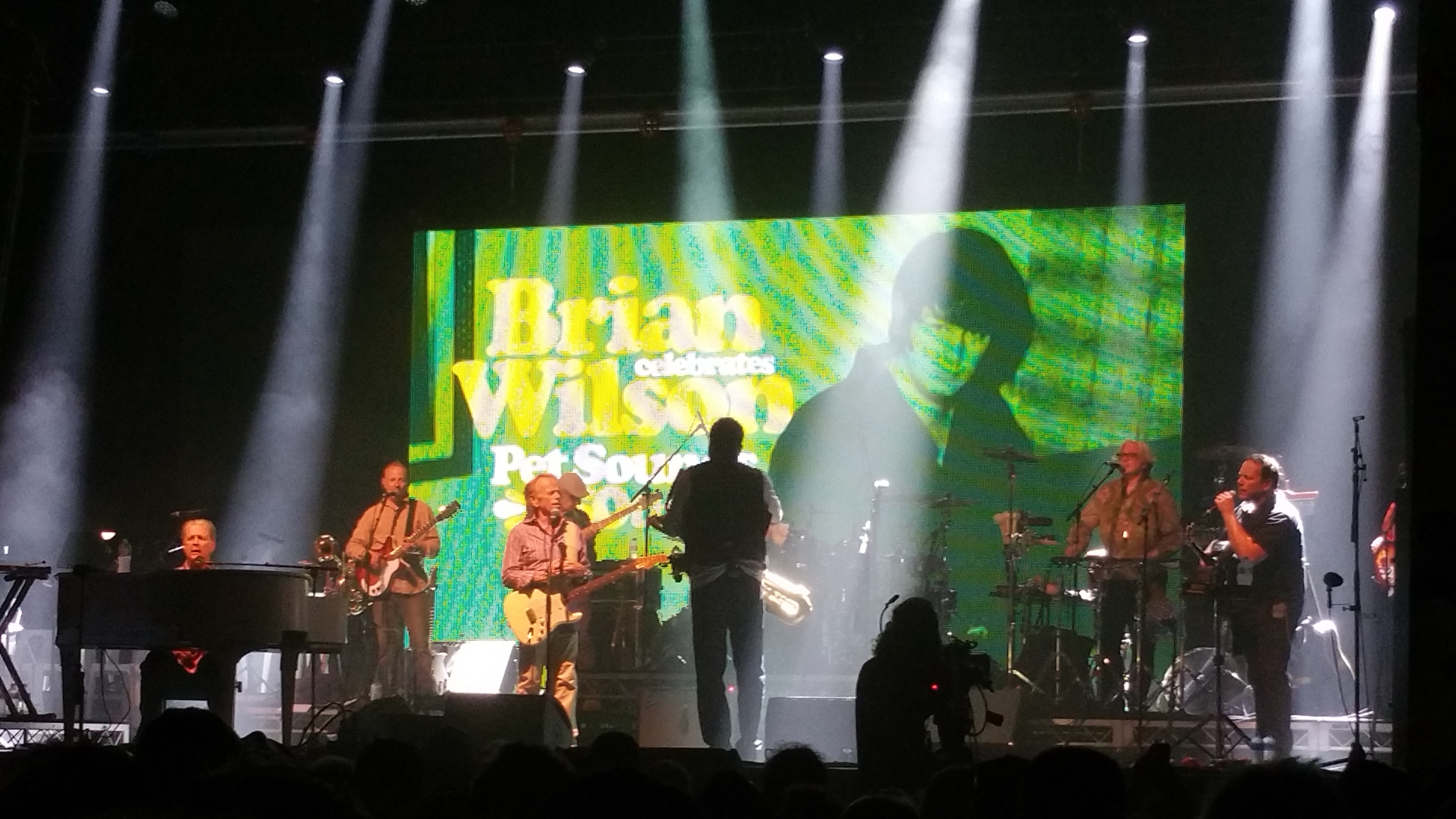
Wilson performing Pet Sounds as a solo artist at Byron Bay Bluesfest, 2016

In the late 1990s, Carl Wilson vetoed an offer for the Beach Boys to perform Pet Sounds in full for ten shows, citing the complexity of replicating the album's arrangements onstage and Brian's diminishing vocal range. Brian ultimately performed the album live as a solo artist in 2000 with a different orchestra in each venue, and on three occasions without orchestra on his 2002 tour to a favorable critical reception. Recordings from Wilson's 2002 concert tour were released as Brian Wilson Presents Pet Sounds Live. Rolling Stone's Dorian Lynskey credited his Pet Sounds performances with establishing a precedent for other artists to play "classic albums" in their entirety, a trend lasting through the 2010s.

In 2013, Wilson performed Pet Sounds at two shows, unannounced, also with Jardine as well as original Beach Boys guitarist David Marks. From 2016 through 2020, Wilson toured Pet Sounds across Australia, Japan, Europe, Canada and the U.S., planned as his final performances of the album. Shortly before Wilson's death in 2025, Jardine reformed Wilson's band as the Pet Sounds Band.

== Retrospective assessments and legacy ==
=== Before the 1990s ===
[Brian Wilson] was a genius who never received his just acclaim, and it's possible that he never will. The main reason for this is absurdly simple: ... Just as it was settling nicely into its position as the world's number one popular music record, the far more fashionable Beatles released Sgt Pepper, and Pet Sounds was forgotten, just like that.

— Melody Maker journalist Richard Williams, 1971

The initial acclaim for Pet Sounds was immediately diverted by the Beatles' successive releases. (Note: John Gilliland, in his 1969 Pop Chronicles series, stated that the album was almost overshadowed by Revolver, released August 1966, and that "a lot people failed to realize that Brian Wilson's production was as unique in its own way as the Beatles'". Richard Williams wrote that although the album had "defied criticism" and briefly "dwarfed all the rest of pop music", its critical attention was redirected when the Beatles released Sgt. Pepper twelve months later.) It received no 1967 Grammy Award nomination. (Note: At the same ceremony, the Anita Kerr Singers won Best Performance by a Vocal Group for an album that included a rendition of "Good Vibrations".) Geoffrey Cannon wrote in his late 1967 column for Listener that the Beach Boys were "lesser than the Beatles" due to the album's "juvenile or specious" ballads and lack of cohesive artistic vision, though his critique was withheld from publication by The Listener's editor. Melody Maker journalist Richard Williams, in a 1971 reappraisal, shared this sentiment, attributing the album's muted reception, relative to the Beatles, to a perceived narrower range of influences. Gene Sculatti, writing in Jazz & Pop magazine in 1968, recognized the album's debt to Rubber Soul and called it "revolutionary only within the confines of the Beach Boys' music" despite also serving as a "final statement of an era and a prophecy that sweeping changes lay ahead."

From the late 1960s onward, Pet Sounds underwent critical reevaluation, with a 1976 NME feature, cited by author Johnny Morgan, as particularly impactful. Ben Edmonds of Circus reported in 1971 that the album's "beauty" had endured amid "the turbulence of the past few years", adding that "many consider it not only the Beach Boys' finest achievement, but a milestone in the progression of contemporary rock as well." Stephen Davis wrote in a 1972 Rolling Stone review that the album represented Wilson's pinnacle as an artist, likening the emotional resonance of its "trenchant cycle of love songs" to "a shatteringly evocative novel". He argued that the album had changed "the course of popular music" and "a few lives in the bargain". Melody Maker critic Josh Ingham wrote in 1973 that while initially "ignored by the public", Pet Sounds had inspired many critics to label Wilson a genius, "not least for being a year ahead of Sgt Pepper in thinking." Ingham concluded that, "With hindsight, of course, Pet Sounds has become the classic album."

After going out of print in 1974, Pet Sounds entered a period of obscurity with prolonged placement in discount bins. Sociomusicologist Simon Frith wrote in 1981 that the album remained widely perceived as "a 'weird' record" within music circles. Dave Marsh's 1979 review in The Rolling Stone Record Guide (1979) awarded four stars (out of a possible five), characterizing it as a "powerful, but spotty" collection where the least experimental songs proved to be the best. By 1985, he wrote that the album was now considered a "classic" while contrasting its perceived disconnect from listeners with the Beatles' contemporaneous work. Granata wrote that upon its 1990 CD reissue, the album remained a "quasi-cult classic" primarily embraced by devoted fans.

=== Later acclaim ===
Professional ratings (1990s–2000s)
Review scores
Source	Rating
AllMusic	5/5 stars
Blender	5/5 stars
Chicago Sun-Times	4/4 stars
Chicago Tribune	4/4 stars
Encyclopedia of Popular Music	5/5 stars
Entertainment Weekly	A+
Q	5/5 stars
Rolling Stone	5/5 stars
The Rolling Stone Album Guide	5/5 stars
Slant Magazine	5/5 stars

Pet Sounds has since been widely ranked among the greatest albums of all time and extensively analyzed for its musical and production innovations. By the 1990s, three British critics' polls placed it at or near the top of their rankings. Publications such as NME, The Times, and Uncut have each ranked it as the greatest album of all time. In 1994, Colin Larkin's All Time Top 1000 Albums, which surveyed the public and a wide range of critics, musicians and industry figures, listed Pet Sounds at number 3; a revised 2000 edition of the book repositioned it at number 18.

In 1998, Pet Sounds was inducted into the Grammy Hall of Fame by the National Academy of Recording Arts and Sciences. Historian Michael Roberts suggested that the album's canonical status solidified following the 1997 release of its expanded reissue, The Pet Sounds Sessions. Crawdaddy founder Paul Williams, writing in 1998, declared Pet Sounds a 20th-century classic comparable to James Joyce's Ulysses, Stanley Kubrick's 2001: A Space Odyssey, and Pablo Picasso's Guernica. In Music USA: The Rough Guide (1999), Richie Unterberger and Samb Hicks deemed the album a "quantum leap" from the Beach Boys' earlier work and regarded its arrangements as among "the most gorgeous" in rock history. Slant Magazine included it on their 2003 list of 50 Essential Vital Pop Albums.

In 2004, the Library of Congress preserved Pet Sounds in the National Recording Registry for its being "culturally, historically, or aesthetically significant." By 2006, over 100 domestic and international publications had recognized the album as one of the greatest ever recorded. Larry Starr, in American Popular Music: From Minstrelsy to MP3 (2006), writes that Pet Sounds had epitomized "state-of-the-art pop music in every sense" through its "diverse and unusual instrumentation", "virtuosic vocal arrangements", "advanced harmonies", and "occasional formal experiments". Chris Smith's 2009 book 101 Albums That Changed Popular Music characterized it as "one of the most innovative recordings in rock" and a work that transformed Wilson from "talented bandleader to studio genius." Philip Lambert, a university music professor who had authored book-length analyses on Wilson and Charles Ives, described the album as "an extraordinary achievement – for any musician, but especially for the 23-year-old Wilson".

Luis Sanchez, in his 2014-published 33⅓ book about Smile, described Pet Sounds as "the score to a film about what rock music doesn't have to be", praising its "inward-looking sentimentalism" and Wilson's "sui generis" vision. Music critic Tim Sommer considered it the greatest album of all time, "probably by about 20 or 30 lengths", and distinguished it as the only one among frequently cited masterpieces like Jethro Tull's Thick as a Brick (1972), Pink Floyd's The Dark Side of the Moon (1973), and Radiohead's OK Computer to have been written from a teenage or adolescent perspective.

=== Totemic status and criticism ===
It keeps going back to Pet Sounds here in my life, and I'm going, "What about this Pet Sounds? Is it really that good an album?" It's stood the test of time, of course, but is it really that great an album to listen to? I don't know.

— Brian Wilson, 2002

In 2000, Pitchfork founder Ryan Schreiber rated the album's latest reissue 7.5/10 and decreed that although Pet Sounds had been "groundbreaking enough to permanantly [sic] alter the course of music", its "straight-forward pop music" had become "passé and clichéd" compared to The Dark Side of the Moon, Loveless and OK Computer. For the 2006 40th Anniversary edition, Pitchfork contributor Dominique Leone awarded the album 9.4, affirming its enduring acclaim but expressing a preference for the Beach Boys' post-Pet Sounds recordings. Leone praised its "hymnal" qualities and themes as having retained their emotional potency, reporting that generations of listeners "will secretly believe you have no soul if you don't announce your allegiance to it" before concluding, "Certainly, regardless of what I write here, the impact and 'influence' of the record will have been in turn hardly influenced at all."

Discussing the album's sleeve design, Jardine expressed disappointment with the zoo photo, stating he had wanted something "more sensitive and enlightening". Johnston dubbed it the "worst cover in the history of the record business", while biographer Peter Ames Carlin deemed the back cover's design "even worse" than the front. Peter Doggett contrasted its aesthetic with mid-1960s sophisticated cover art by contemporaries like the Beatles, Bob Dylan, and the Rolling Stones, calling it "a warning of what could happen when music and image parted company: songs of high romanticism, an album cover of stark banality."

In a 2004 essay, Robert Christgau described Pet Sounds as a "good record, but a totem". Jeff Nordstedt's essay in the 2004 book Kill Your Idols critiqued the album's legacy, arguing that discussions often prioritized its influence over substantive analysis of its music. Nordstedt considered the album's hit songs to be "disjointed" and the remaining tracks "downright insane", criticizing its perceived role in fostering the "overproduction" apparent in 1980s popular music and questioning its artistic authenticity, citing its "inoffensive aesthetics", absence of "visceral charge", and collaborative origins with a commercial jingle writer: "it offends every notion of truth that I hold dear about rock 'n' roll". Comedian Fred Armisen portrayed a character in the television series Portlandia (2011–2018) that was based on his observations of recording engineers fixated on Pet Sounds and vintage studio equipment, whom he likened to 1950s car enthusiasts in their technical obsession. (Note: Musician Atticus Ross, who composed the score to Love & Mercy, acknowledged "an element of cliché that's grown around" the album, exemplified by the Portlandia character.) Stereogum writer Ryan Leas reported in 2016 that Pet Sounds had grown to be "arguably even more of a totemic presence than Revolver".

== Reissues and expanded editions ==
Pet Sounds has had many different reissues since its release in 1966, including remastered mono and remixed stereo versions.

- In 1966, Capitol issued a Duophonic (fake stereo) version of the album that was created through equalization and phasing.
- In 1967, Capitol issued Pet Sounds as part of a three-LP set with Today! and Summer Days, called "The Beach Boys Deluxe Set".
- In 1972, Reprise packaged Pet Sounds as a bonus LP with the Beach Boys' latest album Carl and the Passions – "So Tough".
- In 1974, Reprise issued Pet Sounds as a single disc, which became the album's last reissue until 1990.
- In 1990, Pet Sounds debuted on CD with the addition of three previously unreleased bonus tracks: "Unreleased Backgrounds" (an a cappella demo section of "Don't Talk" sung by Wilson), "Hang On to Your Ego", and "Trombone Dixie". The edition was prepared from the original 1966 mono master, by Mark Linett, who used Sonic Solutions' No Noise processing to mitigate damage that the physical master had accrued. It became one of the first CDs to sell more than a million copies.
- In 1995, DCC issued a 20-bit audiophile version that was mastered by engineer Steve Hoffman. It was created from a safety copy of the original master. According to Granata, this version "garnered numerous accolades, and some feel it comes closest to capturing the spirit and punch of Brian's original 1966 mix."
- In 1997, The Pet Sounds Sessions was released as a four-disc box set. It included the original mono release of Pet Sounds, the album's first stereo mix (created by Linett and Wilson), backing tracks, isolated vocals, and session highlights. It was received with controversy among audiophiles who felt that a stereo mix of Pet Sounds was sacrilege against the original mono recording.
- In 2001, Pet Sounds was issued with mono and "improved" stereo versions, plus "Hang On to Your Ego" as a bonus track, all on one disc.
- On August 29, 2006, Capitol released a 40th Anniversary edition, containing a new 2006 remaster of the original mono mix, DVD mixes (stereo and Surround Sound), and a "making of" documentary. The discs were released in a regular jewel box and a deluxe edition was released in a green fuzzy box. A two-disc colored gatefold vinyl set was released with green (stereo) and yellow (mono) discs.
- In 2016, a 50th anniversary edition box set presented the remastered album in both stereo and mono forms alongside studio sessions outtakes, alternate mixes, and live recordings. Of the 104 tracks, only 14 were previously unreleased.
- In 2023, a Dolby Atmos remix was created by Giles Martin, who closely followed Linett's 1996 stereo mix.
- In 2026, Capitol/UMe released The Pet Sounds Sessions Highlights to mark the 60th anniversary of the original album. It includes selections from The Pet Sounds Sessions.

== Track listing ==
Side one
No.	Title	Writer(s)	Lead vocal(s)	Length
1.	"Wouldn't It Be Nice"	Brian Wilson; Tony Asher; Mike Love	Brian Wilson and Mike Love	2:25
2.	"You Still Believe in Me"	Wilson; Asher	B. Wilson	2:31
3.	"That's Not Me"	Wilson; Asher	Love with B. Wilson	2:28
4.	"Don't Talk (Put Your Head on My Shoulder)"	Wilson; Asher	B. Wilson	2:53
5.	"I'm Waiting for the Day"	Wilson; Love	B. Wilson	3:05
6.	"Let's Go Away for Awhile"	Wilson	instrumental	2:18
7.	"Sloop John B"	traditional, arranged by Wilson	B. Wilson and Love	2:58
Total length:				18:38

Side two
No.	Title	Writer(s)	Lead vocal(s)	Length
1.	"God Only Knows"	Wilson; Asher	Carl Wilson with B. Wilson and Bruce Johnston	2:51
2.	"I Know There's an Answer"	Wilson; Terry Sachen; Love	Love, Al Jardine and B. Wilson	3:09
3.	"Here Today"	Wilson; Asher	Love	2:54
4.	"I Just Wasn't Made for These Times"	Wilson; Asher	B. Wilson	3:12
5.	"Pet Sounds"	Wilson	instrumental	2:22
6.	"Caroline, No"	Wilson; Asher	B. Wilson	2:51
Total length:				17:19 35:57

Notes

- Mike Love was not originally credited for "Wouldn't It Be Nice" and "I Know There's an Answer". His credits were awarded after a 1994 court case.
- Al Jardine's contribution to the arrangement of "Sloop John B" remains uncredited.
- Vocal credits sourced from Alan Boyd and Craig Slowinski.

== Personnel ==
Per archivists John Brode, Will Crerar, Joshilyn Hoisington, and Craig Slowinski.

The Beach Boys

- Al Jardine – lead, harmony, and backing vocals
- Bruce Johnston – co-lead, harmony, and backing vocals
- Mike Love – lead, harmony, and backing vocals
- Brian Wilson – lead, harmony, and backing vocals; Steinway plucked piano strings (track 2 intro), Hammond C-3 organ (tracks 3, 9), Wegman tack piano (track 10), Steinway grand piano (track 12), Fender Precision bass guitar and Fender VI bass guitar (track 3), handclaps (track 8); sound effects (track 12); producer
- Carl Wilson – lead, harmony, and backing vocals; Fender Stratocaster and Rickenbacker 360 12-string electric guitar and handclaps (track 3), mandolin (track 9)
- Dennis Wilson – backing and harmony vocals; floor tom and handclaps (track 3)

Guests

- Tony Asher – backing vocals and Steinway grand piano foot pedals (track 2 intro)
- Terry Melcher – tambourine and handclaps (track 3)
- Marilyn Wilson – backing vocals (track 2 intro)
- Banana the Weimaraner and Louie the Beagle – barks and woofs (track 13)

Session musicians (also known as "the Wrecking Crew")

- Chuck Berghofer – upright bass
- Hal Blaine – drums, bicycle bells, bicycle horns, cymbals, wood blocks, sleigh bells, tambourine, timpani, boobams
- Glen Campbell – Mosrite Mark XII 12-string electric guitar, 12-string acoustic guitar, banjo
- Frank Capp – jingle sticks, timpani, glockenspiel, vibraphone, bass drum, tambourine, temple blocks
- Al Casey – 12-string Guild slide guitar, Martin acoustic guitar, Guild 12-string electric guitar
- Roy Caton – trumpet
- Jerry Cole – 12-string electric guitar, Fender Stratocaster electric guitar
- Gary L. Coleman – timpani
- Mike Deasy – acoustic guitar
- Al De Lory – Steinway grand piano, harpsichord, Hammond C-3 organ, Steinway grand piano with taped strings
- Steve Douglas – tenor saxophone, Steinway grand piano, cricket clicker, tambourine, jingle stick
- Carl Fortina – accordion
- Ritchie Frost – drums, bongos
- Jim Gordon – drums, waxed paper cups
- Bill Green – bass clarinet, flute, alto flute, bass saxophone, bass flute; wood blocks, slapstick, guiro, tambourine, sleigh bells
- Leonard Hartman – cor anglais, bass clarinet
- Jim Horn – clarinet, flute, baritone or bass saxophone, alto flute, alto saxophone
- Paul Horn – alto flute
- Jules Jacob – oboe
- Plas Johnson – tenor saxophone, clarinet, alto flute; wood blocks, slapstick, guiro, tambourine, sleigh bells
- Carol Kaye – Fender Precision bass guitar, Danelectro 6-string bass guitar, Guild 12-string electric guitar; wood blocks, slapstick, guiro, tambourine, sleigh bells
- Barney Kessel – Danelectro Bellzouki 7010 12-string electric guitar, Gibson acoustic guitar, Gibson custom 12-string mandolin
- Bobby Klein – clarinet
- Larry Knechtel – tack piano, Hammond C-3 organ, harpsichord, Hammond B-3 organ
- Frank Marocco – accordion
- Gail Martin – trombone
- Nick Martinis – drums
- Mike Melvoin – harpsichord
- Jay Migliori – baritone saxophone, clarinet, flute, baritone or bass saxophone, bass clarinet, tenor saxophone, alto flute
- Tommy Morgan – bass harmonica
- Jack Nimitz – bass saxophone, tenor saxophone
- Bill Pitman – acoustic guitar
- Ray Pohlman – Fender VI bass guitar
- Don Randi – Steinway grand piano with taped strings, tack piano
- Alan Robinson – French horn
- Lyle Ritz – upright bass; wood blocks, slapstick, guiro, tambourine, sleigh bells
- Billy Strange – Mosrite Combo XII 12-string electric guitar, Mosrite Combo electric lead guitar
- Ernie Tack – trombone
- Paul Tanner – Electro-Theremin
- Tommy Tedesco – acoustic guitar; wood blocks, slapstick, guiro, tambourine, sleigh bells
- Julius Wechter – timpani, finger cymbals, vibraphone

The Sid Sharp Strings

- violins – Arnold Belnick, James Getzoff, William Kurasch, Leonard Malarsky, Jerome Reisler, Ralph Schaeffer, Sid Sharp, Tibor Zelig
- violas – Norman Botnick, Joseph DiFiore, Harry Hyams, Darrel Terwilliger
- cellos – Justin DiTullio, Jesse Ehrlich, Joseph Saxon

Technical staff

- Engineers – Bruce Botnick, Bill Brittan, Chuck Britz, Bowen David, Larry Levine, Pete Romano, Ralph Valentin, Winston Wong

== Charts ==
=== Weekly charts ===
1966 weekly chart performance
Chart	Peak position
UK Disc and Music Echo Top Ten LPs	2
UK Melody Maker Top Ten LPs	2
UK New Musical Express Best Selling LPs in Britain	2
UK Record Retailer LPs Chart	2
US Billboard Top LPs	10
US Cash Box Top 100 Albums	8
US Record World 100 Top LP's	6
West German Musikmarkt LP Hit-Parade	16

Subsequent weekly chart performance
Year	Chart	Peak position
1972	Australian Kent Music Report	42
1972	Canadian RPM 100 Albums	40
1972	US Billboard Top LPs & Tape	50
1990	US Billboard 200	162
1995	UK Albums Chart	17
2001	US Billboard Top Pop Catalog Albums	41
2006	Japanese Oricon Albums Chart	95
2008	US Billboard Catalog Albums	8
2015	US Billboard 200	182
2016	Belgian Albums (Ultratop Flanders)	50
2016	Belgian Albums (Ultratop Wallonia)	100
2016	Dutch Albums (Album Top 100)	72
2016	French Albums (SNEP)	185
2016	German Albums (GfK Entertainment)	58
2016	Japanese Albums (Oricon)	56
2016	Scottish Albums (OCC)	19
2016	South Korean Albums (Gaon)	96
2016	Swiss Albums (Schweizer Hitparade)	41
2016	UK Albums (OCC) (Note: The 1995 reissue of Pet Sounds charted in the UK in 2016.)	26
2016	US Billboard Catalog Albums	49
2021	Greek Albums (IFPI)	5

=== Year-end charts ===
1966 year-end chart performance
Chart	Position
UK Record Retailer Year-End	5
US Billboard Year-End	43
US Cash Box Year-End	33

== Certifications ==
Certifications for Pet Sounds
Region	Certification	Certified units/sales
United Kingdom (BPI)	2× Platinum	600,000^{‡}
United States (RIAA)	2× Platinum	2,000,000^{‡}
^{^} Shipments figures based on certification alone.^{‡} Sales+streaming figures based on certification alone.

== Accolades ==
Rankings for Pet Sounds
Year	Organization	Accolade	Rank
1993	The Times	The 100 Best Albums of All Time	1
1993	New Musical Express	New Musical Express Writers Top 100 Albums	1
1995	Mojo	Mojo's 100 Greatest Albums of All Time	1
1997	The Guardian	100 Best Albums Ever	6
1997	Channel 4	The 100 Greatest Albums	33
2000	Virgin	The Virgin Top 100 Albums	18
2001	VH1	VH1's Greatest Albums Ever	3
2002	BBC	BBC 6 Music: Best Albums of All Time	11
2003	Rolling Stone	The 500 Greatest Albums of All Time	2
2006	Q	Q Magazine's 100 Greatest Albums Ever	12
2006	The Observer	The 50 Albums That Changed Music	10
2012	Rolling Stone	The 500 Greatest Albums of All Time	2
2015	Platendraaier	Top 30 Albums of the 60s	7
2016	Uncut	200 Greatest Albums of All Time	1
2017	Pitchfork	The 200 Best Albums of the 1960s	2
2020	Rolling Stone	The 500 Greatest Albums of All Time	2
2023	Rolling Stone	The 500 Greatest Albums of All Time	2
2024	Paste	The 300 Greatest Albums of All Time	10

== Bibliography ==
- Abjorensen, Norman (2017). Historical Dictionary of Popular Music. Rowman & Littlefield Publishers. ISBN 978-1-5381-0215-2.
- Badman, Keith (2004). The Beach Boys: The Definitive Diary of America's Greatest Band, on Stage and in the Studio. Backbeat Books. ISBN 978-0-87930-818-6.
- Bogdanov, Vladimir; Woodstra, Chris; Erlewine, Stephen Thomas, eds. (2002). All Music Guide to Rock: The Definitive Guide to Rock, Pop, and Soul. Backbeat Books. ISBN 978-0-87930-653-3.
- Brend, Mark (2005). Strange Sounds: Offbeat Instruments and Sonic Experiments in Pop. Backbeat. ISBN 9780879308551.
- Butler, Jan (2012). "The Beach Boys' Pet Sounds and the Musicology of Record Production". In Frith, Simon; Zagorski-Thomas, Simon (eds.). The Art of Record Production: An Introductory Reader for a New Academic Field. Ashgate Publishing. ISBN 978-1-4094-0678-5.
- Carlin, Peter Ames (2006). Catch a Wave: The Rise, Fall, and Redemption of the Beach Boys' Brian Wilson. Rodale. ISBN 978-1-59486-320-2.
- Covach, John Rudolph (2015) [2006]. What's That Sound? An Introduction to Rock and Its History (4th ed.). New York: W. W. Norton & Company. ISBN 9780393937251.
- Cunningham, Mark (1998). Good Vibrations: A History of Record Production. London: Sanctuary. ISBN 978-1-860742422.
- DeRogatis, Jim (2003). Turn On Your Mind: Four Decades of Great Psychedelic Rock. Hal Leonard Corporation. ISBN 978-0-634-05548-5.
- Dillon, Mark (2012). Fifty Sides of the Beach Boys: The Songs That Tell Their Story. ECW Press. ISBN 978-1-77090-198-8.
- Doe, Andrew; Tobler, John (2009). "The Beach Boys – Pet Sounds – May 1966". In Charlesworth, Chris (ed.). 25 Albums that Rocked the World. Omnibus Press. ISBN 978-0-85712-044-1.
- Doggett, Peter (2016). Electric Shock: From the Gramophone to the iPhone: 125 years of Pop Music. London: Vintage. ISBN 9780099575191.
- Edmondson, Jacqueline, ed. (2013). Music in American Life: An Encyclopedia of the Songs, Styles, Stars, and Stories that Shaped our Culture. ABC-CLIO. ISBN 978-0-313-39348-8.
- Downes, Stephen (2014). Aesthetics of Music: Musicological Perspectives. Routledge. ISBN 978-1-136-48691-3.
- Einarson, John (2010). Forever Changes: Arthur Lee and the Book of Love. Jawbone Press. ISBN 978-1-906002-31-2.
- Everett, Walter (2008). The Foundations of Rock: From "Blue Suede Shoes" to "Suite: Judy Blue Eyes". Oxford University Press. ISBN 978-0-19-531024-5.
- Fine, Jason (2004). "The Beach Boys". In Brackett, Nathan; Hoard, Christian (eds.). The New Rolling Stone Album Guide (4th ed.). Simon & Schuster. ISBN 0-7432-0169-8.
- Fusilli, Jim (2005). Beach Boys' Pet Sounds. Bloomsbury Publishing. ISBN 978-1-4411-1266-8.
- Gaines, Steven (1986). Heroes and Villains: The True Story of The Beach Boys. New York: Da Capo Press. ISBN 0306806479.
- Gillett, Charlie (1984). The Sound of the City: The Rise of Rock and Roll. Perseus Books Group. ISBN 978-0-306-80683-4.
- Greene, John Robert (2010). America in the Sixties. Syracuse University Press. ISBN 978-0-8156-5133-8.
- Granata, Charles L. (2003). Wouldn't it Be Nice: Brian Wilson and the Making of the Beach Boys' Pet Sounds. Chicago Review Press. ISBN 978-1-55652-507-0.
- Harrison, Daniel (1997). "After Sundown: The Beach Boys' Experimental Music" ( (PDF)). In Covach, John; Boone, Graeme M. (eds.). Understanding Rock: Essays in Musical Analysis. Oxford University Press. pp. 33–57. ISBN 978-0-19-988012-6. Archived from the original on May 24, 2015.
- Hegarty, Paul; Halliwell, Martin (2011). Beyond and Before: Progressive Rock Since the 1960s. Continuum International Publishing. ISBN 978-0-8264-4483-7.
- Hoskyns, Barney (2009). Waiting for the Sun: A Rock 'n' Roll History of Los Angeles. Backbeat Books. ISBN 978-0-87930-943-5.
- Howard, David N. (2004). Sonic Alchemy: Visionary Music Producers and Their Maverick Recordings (1 ed.). Milwaukee, Wisconsin: Hal Leonard. ISBN 978-0-63405-560-7.
- Howland, John (2021). Hearing Luxe Pop: Glorification, Glamour, and the Middlebrow in American Popular Music. University of California Press. ISBN 978-0-520-30010-1.
- Irvin, Jim (2007). "1966 – The Beach Boys – Pet Sounds". The Mojo Collection: 4th Edition. Canongate Books. ISBN 978-1-84767-643-6.
- Janovitz, Bill (2013). Rocks Off: 50 Tracks That Tell the Story of the Rolling Stones. St. Martin's Press. ISBN 978-1-250-02631-6.
- Johnson, Michael (2009). Pop Music Theory: Harmony, Form, and Composition (2nd ed.). Boston, Mass.: Cinemasonique Music. ISBN 978-0-578-03539-0.
- Jones, Carys Wyn (2008). The Rock Canon: Canonical Values in the Reception of Rock Albums. Ashgate Publishing, Ltd. ISBN 978-0-7546-6244-0.
- Joyson, Vernon (1984). The Acid Trip: A Complete Guide to Psychedelic Music. Todmorden, England: Babylon Books. ISBN 978-0-907188-24-7.
- Kent, David (2005). Australian Chart Book (1940-1969). Australian Chart Book. ISBN 9780646444390.
- Kent, Nick (2009). "The Last Beach Movie Revisited: The Life of Brian Wilson". The Dark Stuff: Selected Writings on Rock Music. Da Capo Press. ISBN 9780786730742.
- Lambert, Philip (2007). Inside the Music of Brian Wilson: The Songs, Sounds, and Influences of the Beach Boys' Founding Genius. Bloomsbury Publishing. ISBN 978-1-4411-0748-0.
- Lambert, Philip (March 2008). "Brian Wilson's Pet Sounds". Twentieth-Century Music. 5 (1). Cambridge University Press: 109–133. doi:10.1017/S1478572208000625. S2CID 162871617. Archived from the original on October 2, 2021.
- Lambert, Philip (2016). Lambert, Philip (ed.). Good Vibrations: Brian Wilson and the Beach Boys in Critical Perspective. University of Michigan Press. doi:10.3998/mpub.9275965. ISBN 978-0-472-11995-0. S2CID 192796203.
- Larkin, Colin (1994). All Time Top 1000 Albums. Enfield, Middlesex, England: Guinness Pub. ISBN 9780851127866.
- Larkin, Colin, ed. (2000). All Time Top 1000 Albums (3rd ed.). Virgin Books. ISBN 0-7535-0493-6.
- Larkin, Colin (2007). The Encyclopedia of Popular Music (5th ed.). Omnibus Press. ISBN 978-0-85712-595-8.
- Leaf, David (1978). The Beach Boys and the California Myth. New York: Grosset & Dunlap. ISBN 978-0-448-14626-3.
- Leaf, David (2022). God Only Knows: The Story of Brian Wilson, the Beach Boys and the California Myth (3rd ed.). Omnibus Press. ISBN 9781913172756.
- Love, Mike (2016). Good Vibrations: My Life as a Beach Boy. Penguin Publishing Group. ISBN 978-0-698-40886-9.
- Lowe, Kelly Fisher (2007). The Words and Music of Frank Zappa. U of Nebraska Press. ISBN 978-0-8032-6005-4.
- Marsh, Dave (1985). Fortunate Son: Criticism and Journalism by America's Best-known Rock Writer. Random House. ISBN 978-0-394-72119-4.
- Marsh, Dave; Swenson, John, eds. (1983). The New Rolling Stone Record Guide. New York: Random House/Rolling Stone Press. ISBN 0-394-72107-1.
- Martin, Bill (1998), Listening to the Future: The Time of Progressive Rock, Chicago: Open Court, ISBN 0-8126-9368-X
- Mojo, ed. (2007). "The Beach Boys: Friends". The Mojo Collection: 4th Edition. Canongate Books. ISBN 978-1-84767-643-6.
- Moorefield, Virgil (2010). The Producer as Composer: Shaping the Sounds of Popular Music. MIT Press. ISBN 978-0-262-13457-6.
- Morgan, Johnny (2015). The Beach Boys: America's Band. New York: Sterling. ISBN 978-1-4549-1709-0.
- Murphy, James B. (2015). Becoming the Beach Boys, 1961-1963. McFarland. ISBN 978-0-7864-7365-6.
- Nordstedt, Jeff (2004). "Pet Sounds". In DeRogatis, Jim; Carrillo, Carmél (eds.). Kill Your Idols: A New Generation of Rock Writers Reconsiders the Classics. Fort Lee, N.J.: Barricade Books. ISBN 9781569802762.
- O'Regan, Jody (2014). When I Grow Up: The Development of the Beach Boys' Sound (1962–1966) (PDF) (Thesis). Queensland Conservatorium. doi:10.25904/1912/2556.
- Perone, James E. (2012). The Album: A Guide to Pop Music's Most Provocative, Influential, and Important Creations. ABC-CLIO. ISBN 978-0-313-37907-9.
- Pinch, T. J; Trocco, Frank (2009). Analog Days: The Invention and Impact of the Moog Synthesizer. Harvard University Press. ISBN 978-0-674-04216-2.
- Preiss, Byron (1979). The Beach Boys. New York: Ballantine Books. ISBN 978-0-345-27398-7.
- Priore, Domenic (2005). Smile: The Story of Brian Wilson's Lost Masterpiece. London: Sanctuary. ISBN 1-86074-627-6.
- Roberts, Martin (2019). Cornelius's Fantasma. Bloomsbury Academic. ISBN 978-1-5013-3017-9.
- Romano, Will (2010). Mountains Come Out of the Sky: The Illustrated History of Prog Rock. Milwaukee, WI: Backbeat Books. ISBN 978-0879309916.
- Rosenberg, Stuart (September 2009). Rock and Roll and the American Landscape: The Birth of an Industry and the Expansion of the Popular Culture, 1955-1969. iUniverse. ISBN 9781440164583.
- Sanchez, Luis (2014). The Beach Boys' Smile. Bloomsbury Publishing. ISBN 978-1-62356-956-3.
- Savage, Jon (2015). 1966: The Year the Decade Exploded. London: Faber & Faber. ISBN 978-0-571-27763-6.
- Schinder, Scott (2007). "The Beach Boys". In Schinder, Scott; Schwartz, Andy (eds.). Icons of Rock: An Encyclopedia of the Legends Who Changed Music Forever. Westport, Connecticut: Greenwood Press. ISBN 978-0-313-33845-8.
- Smith, Chris (2009). One Hundred and One Albums that Changed Popular Music. Oxford University Press. ISBN 978-0-19-537371-4.
- Stanley, Bob (2013). Yeah Yeah Yeah: The Story of Modern Pop. Faber & Faber. ISBN 978-0-571-28198-5.
- Starr, Larry (2007) [2006]. American Popular Music: From Minstrelsy to MP3 (2nd ed.). New York: Oxford University Press. ISBN 9780195300536.
- Stebbins, Jon (2011). The Beach Boys FAQ: All That's Left to Know About America's Band. Backbeat Books. ISBN 978-1-4584-2914-8.
- Tobler, John (1978). The Beach Boys. Chartwell Books. ISBN 0890091749.
- Toop, David (1999). Exotica: Fabricated Soundscapes in a Real World: Fabricated Soundscapes in the Real World (1st ed.). London: Serpent's Tail. ISBN 978-1852425951.
- Tunbridge, Laura (2010). The Song Cycle. Cambridge University Press. ISBN 978-0-521-89644-3.
- Umphred, Neal (1997). "Let's Go Away for Awhile: The Continuing Saga of Brian Wilson's Pet Sounds". In Abbott, Kingsley (ed.). Back to the Beach: A Brian Wilson and the Beach Boys Reader. Helter Skelter. ISBN 978-1-90092-402-3.
- Unterberger, Richie; Hicks, Samb (1999). Music USA: The Rough Guide. Rough Guides. ISBN 978-1-85828-421-7.
- White, Timothy (1996). The Nearest Faraway Place: Brian Wilson, the Beach Boys, and the Southern Californian Experience. Macmillan. ISBN 0333649370.
- Williams, Paul; Hartwell, David G. (2000). The 20th Century's Greatest Hits: A Top 40 List (1st ed.). New York: Forge. ISBN 978-0312873912.
- Wilson, Brian (2002). "Foreword". 1000 Days That Shook the World (The Psychedelic Beatles – April 1, 1965 to December 26, 1967). London: Mojo Special Limited Edition. OCLC 155990822.
- Wilson, Brian; Greenman, Ben (2016). I Am Brian Wilson: A Memoir. Da Capo Press. ISBN 978-0-306-82307-7.
- Zager, Michael (2012). Music Production: for Producers, Composers, Arrangers, and Students (2nd ed.). Lanham, Md.: Scarecrow Press. ISBN 978-0-8108-8201-0.
- Zak, Albin (2001). Poetics of Rock: Cutting Tracks, Making Records. University of California Press. ISBN 978-0-520-92815-2.
