= Hook (music) =

Musical idea used to add appeal

A hook is a musical idea, often a short riff, passage, or phrase, that is used in popular music to make a song appealing and to "catch the ear of the listener." The term generally applies to popular music, especially rock, R&B, hip-hop, dance, and pop. In these genres, the hook is often found in, or consists of, the chorus, meaning it repeats multiple times throughout a song. A hook can be either melodic or rhythmic, and often incorporates the main motif for a piece of music.

== Definitions ==
One definition of a hook is "a musical or lyrical phrase that stands out and is easily remembered." Definitions typically include some of the following: that a hook is repetitive, attention-grabbing, memorable, easy to dance to, and has commercial potential and lyrics. A hook has been defined as a "part of a song, sometimes the title or key lyric line, that keeps recurring." Alternatively, the term has been defined as

the foundation of commercial songwriting, particularly hit-single writing, [varying in length from the repetition of] one note or a series of notes ... [to] a lyric phrase, full lines, or an entire verse. The hook is 'what you're selling'

and can be something as insubstantial as a 'sound' (such as da doo ron ron or toora-loora-loo) but

ideally should contain one or more of the following: (a) a driving, danceable rhythm; (b) a melody that stays in people's minds; (c) a lyric that furthers the dramatic action, or defines a person or place.

While some melodic hooks include skips of an octave or more to make the line more interesting, a hook can be equally catchy by employing rhythmic syncopation or other devices. A hook may also garner attention from listeners from other factors, such as the vocal timbre or instrumentation, as in the case of the Beach Boys' use of an Electro-Theremin in "Good Vibrations". Some hooks become popular without using any unusual elements. For example, in the song "Be My Baby", performed by female group The Ronettes, the hook consists of the words "be my baby" over the conventional I–vi–IV–V chord progression of the chorus. Hooks in hip-hop almost always refer to the chorus between verses; as in the lyrics to Vanilla Ice's "Ice Ice Baby", "check out the hook, while my DJ revolves it", that leads into the chorus itself.

== Use in market research ==
The hooks of a song may be used in market research to assist in gauging the popularity of a song based on the listener's ability to recognize the song's hook. Often radio stations conduct "call out" either online, via telephone, or a music test (either online or in an in-person setting) to conduct surveys. Stations may use the services of a professional "hook service" or prepare the materials themselves. In some studies, radio stations play the hook, typically 8–12 bars long, for audiences of up to 150 participants. The participants are then asked to rate the song on a scale from "dislike very much" to "like very much". Top 40 stations typically can't wait that long for results and have participants "call out" directly, by listening and rating different hooks. Studies such as these inform the radio station how popular current songs are or if the audience is "burned out" of a certain song. Market research based on hooks gives radio stations of all genres awareness of what their audience demographic wants to listen to, and is even used to test the musical boundaries of the audience. Some groups even release these research hooks on a single's CD release.

== Scientific research ==
A European consortium (including Utrecht University and the University of Amsterdam) studies the hook by using online games and the wisdom of the crowd to understand and quantify the effect of catchiness on musical memory.

== See also ==
- Catchiness
- Earworm
- Lick
- Ostinato
- Refrain
- Theme
- Vamp
