= I Just Wasn't Made for These Times =

1966 song by the Beach Boys

- 1996 Sub Pop single cover

Song by the Beach Boys

from the album Pet Sounds
- Released: May 16, 1966
- Recorded: February 14 – April 13, 1966
- Studio: Gold Star and Columbia, Hollywood
- Length: 3:21
- Label: Capitol
- Songwriters: Brian Wilson; Tony Asher
- Producer: Brian Wilson

Licensed audio
- "I Just Wasn't Made for These Times" on YouTube

Audio sample
- file; help

"I Just Wasn't Made for These Times" is a song by the American rock band the Beach Boys from their 1966 album Pet Sounds. Written by Brian Wilson and Tony Asher, the lyrics describe the disillusionment of someone who struggles to fit into society. Musically, it is distinguished for its melodic bass guitar, layered vocals, and Electro-Theremin solo, marking the first time the instrument was used in popular music and the first time theremin-like sounds were used on a rock record.

One of the last tracks completed for Pet Sounds, Wilson produced the recording with the aid of 14 studio musicians—including Electro-Theremin inventor Paul Tanner—who variously played percussion, basses, guitars, clarinets, piccolo, harpsichord, tack piano, and bass harmonica. All six Beach Boys sang on the track. In addition to multiple vocal counterpoints, the chorus features Spanish-sung backing vocals: "Oh, ¿cuándo seré? Un día seré" ("When will I be? One day I will be").

"I Just Wasn't Made for These Times" remains one of the Beach Boys' most celebrated songs, and one closely identified with Wilson's personal life. In 1995, it provided the title of Don Was' documentary of Wilson's life, and, in turn, the title of the film's soundtrack (also Wilson's second solo album). In 1996, to promote the upcoming release of The Pet Sounds Sessions, the first true stereo mix of the song was released as a single on the alternative rock label Sub Pop.

== Background and lyrics ==
"I Just Wasn't Made for These Times" was written by Brian Wilson and Tony Asher for the Beach Boys' Pet Sounds album in early 1966. Although Wilson claimed that Asher only provided the words to his music, Asher credited himself with contributing musical ideas to at least three songs on the album, including this one. (Note: The other two were "That's Not Me" and "Caroline, No".) Asher felt that the writing was different from their other collaborations: "In many of the other songs, when Brian would express a feeling, I would say, ‘Oh, yes, I’ve had those feelings, maybe not in the same way or the same degree, but I understood them. But this one I didn't relate to.” On another occasion, he stated the song evolved from a discussion he had with Wilson about the fact that "[n]either one of us was a particularly popular kid" in high school.

The lyrics describe someone who is depressed and unsure of their place in society, where they can express themselves, who they can trust, and why "good" things that they have "going for myself" always collapse. Whether the character feels they are before or ahead of their time is left ambiguous. In critic Donald A. Guercio's interpretation: "The lyrics are a first-person chronicle of disillusionment from a narrator who, despite being intelligent, can't find a place where he can comfortably feel like a part of the world." Music historian Charles Granata read the song as a "plaintive ballad about coming to terms with one's differences .. Ultimately, the answer to his question—'Where do I fit in?'—lies in the realization that he doesn't."

I remember that when we finished the song, I had the sense that it might not end up on the album. [...] I thought that Brian did not want to make such a raw emotional statement. But he did, and it took a lot of guts.

— Tony Asher

Asked about the song in a 1976 interview, Wilson stated, "That song reflects my life. It's about a guy who was crying because he thought he was too advanced, and that he'd eventually have to leave people behind." When the interviewer suggested that Wilson appeared to share the character's experiences, he responded, "Yes, it did happen to me. I did Pet Sounds and all my friends thought I was crazy to do it." Asher stated, "It was definitely a lyric written from Brian's perspective, although during the hours we spent writing, we didn't talk about his socialization per se. He never asked me to interpret his feelings in one of our songs, and certainly not this one."

Granata described it as "[p]erhaps the most sensitive, moving song on Pet Sounds", projecting "an overwhelming sense that the lyric represents Brian's life, his view of himself and his music." Academic Christopher Kirkey called it "arguably the most personalized and introspective track on Pet Sounds."

== Composition ==
"I Just Wasn't Made for These Times" is in the key of B♭ major. The chord progression for the first four bars of the song is ii^{11} – I^{9} – ♭VII^{(9♯11)} – vi^{11} – V^{(add6)}. According to musicologist Philip Lambert, "We sense the unease right away, when the song begins on an unstable chord on step 2 of the scale. He states that as the bassline descends from the intervals 2 to 7♭, it supports "complex harmonies that alternately suggest both stacked upper thirds and suspended or decorative tones."

The electric bass guitar is used as a lead instrument, playing melodically beneath the vocals. In the verses, it plays eighth notes in a register that was rare for pop bass of the era. Musician Amadeo Ciminnsi explained, "Most bass lines of the day employed simple foundational rhythms and root notes to outline the harmony and drive the rhythm section. Brian departs from this by including a more involved rhythm in the verse—and using non-chord tones in the bass line." Carol Kaye commented,

A pretty unusual bass line because it didn't use a lot of root. He used thirds a lot. That's jazz. In jazz, the bass line goes to the third because it changes the structure of the chord. Motown used the suspended eleventh. As part of his orchestrating, Brian wrote the bass part, using it as a third or a sixth in place of its normal root note. Brian was the first one to do that.

A honky-tonk-style piano part, played by keyboardist Don Randi, occurs during the chorus, although mixed very low in the recording. It is substantially more audible in the stereo mix of the track created for The Pet Sounds Sessions (1996).

According to Lambert, the strongest musical indication of Wilson's "innovative vision" for the album is heard in the cumulative vocal layering in the chorus, with each line sung by Wilson via overdubs. Wilson sings, "Sometimes I feel very sad", "Ain't found the right thing I can put my heart and soul into", and "People I know don't wanna be where I'm at". Lambert called this "one of the most extreme examples of Wilson's 'opera'-style layering, with each part projecting its own distinct personality." Following the last chorus, the melody is doubled in fourths by a clarinet and bass clarinet, the latter doubled an octave higher by Electro-Theremin.

== Recording and Electro-Theremin ==
Wilson produced the backing track (logged on the AFM contract as "I Just Wasn't Made for These Things") on February 14, 1966. Wilson hired session musician Paul Tanner to play Electro-Theremin (an instrument he invented) possibly with the mistaken assumption that he was using a real theremin for the song's recording. According to Tanner, "Brian phoned and spoke to my wife. I was on a record date, but she knew that the person I was playing for had never heard of overtime!" The occasion marked the first time the Electro-Theremin was used in popular music and the first time theremin-like sounds were used on a rock record.

Granata identified the Electro-Theremin as the "strangest" instrument used on the album. In a 1996 interview, Wilson said that he had been frightened by the "witchy, bewitching sounds" of a theremin as a child, and could not remember "how the heck I ever arrived at the place where I'd want to get one--but we got it." At that time, theremins were most often associated with the 1945 Alfred Hitchcock film Spellbound, but their most common presence was in the theme music for the television sitcom My Favorite Martian, which ran from 1963 to 1966. Engineer Chuck Britz surmised, "He just walked in and said, 'I have this new sound for you.' I think he must have heard the sound somewhere and loved it, and built a song around it." Biographer John Tobler states that Wilson thought of the instrument after having "watched a Bette Davis horror film".

A total of 14 musicians played on the instrumental recording. The session was unusual for Tanner, as he recalled, Wilson forwent notation and instead sung Tanner's part for him to play. Wilson initially attempted to record at Western Studio, but ran out of studio time, and immediately moved to Gold Star. Take 6 of the orchestra's performance was marked as "best", after which the session was concluded with the recording of Wilson's lead vocal. Group vocal overdubs for "I Just Wasn't Made for These Times" followed on March 10 and April 13 at Columbia Studio and involved all six Beach Boys.

== Critical reception ==
Though he was the leader of the biggest pop group in America, though he was married to a thoughtful and loving woman, though he was only twenty-three, there was something incredibly old and incredibly melancholy within Brian Wilson. "Sometimes I feel very sad," the song goes, and no amount of convoluted Bob Dylan or Joni Mitchell wordplay is as effective or affecting.

— Bob Stanley, Yeah, Yeah, Yeah! The Story of Modern Pop! (2013)

On May 16, 1966, "I Just Wasn't Made for These Times" was released as the 11th track on Pet Sounds. In his self-described "unbiased" review of the album for Record Mirror, Norman Jopling described the song as "a nostalgic ballad, with sympathetic lyrics and a clever sense of development. But it's somehow depressing, which was probably the intention. Builds up all the time with slight hints of falsetto." The Who frontman Pete Townshend told Melody Maker that the album was "too remote" and "written for a feminine audience [...] sympathetic to Brian Wilson's personal problems." Townshend explained, "You've just got to listen to the words, like 'I'm searching for places where new things can be found but people just put me down [sic].' It seems that Brian has left the Beach Boys to be a record producer."

Retrospectively, AllMusic reviewer Donald Gearisco lauded the song as "one of the most moving and powerful tracks in the Beach Boys catalog". He said that the recording features "overwhelming emotion and lush musical textures", while the lyrics were relatable for "anyone who has ever felt 'lost in the crowd'". Writing his book Strange Sounds: Offbeat Instruments and Sonic Experiments in Pop (2005), Mark Brend praised Tanner's solo, saying that it "demonstrates perfectly the electro-theremin's appeal. The pitching is accurate to a degree that only the very best 'real' thereminists' could ever achieve, yet the tone retains the Theremin's haunting ethereal quality – somehow both human-sounding and alien at the same time."

In 2016, the staff of Treblezine ranked "I Just Wasn't Made for These Times" number 3 in their list of the finest songs of the counterculture era, calling it "both a mild rebuke to the temporal world Wilson endured and an intense wish to belong to it. And in an example of delayed poetic justice, it's one of the Beach Boys' most timeless songs."

== Sub Pop single ==
On June 4, 1996, Sub Pop released a stereo mix of "I Just Wasn't Made for These Times" as a single with a vocal only version of "Wouldn't It Be Nice" and with the stereo backing to "Here Today" as the B-side. It was an unusual release for the label, which had traditionally issued records by alternative rock groups such as Nirvana and Soundgarden. 15,000 copies of the single were pressed.

According to label co-owner Jonathan Poneman, they had been approached by Capitol to issue the single, "knowing that [we had] some Beach Boys enthusiasts", to help promote the upcoming Pet Sounds Sessions box set. He said, "We made it look like our original Singles Club singles with the black bar [at the top], so there's a little bit of humor there if you think back [to our older acts]: Flaming Lips, Mudhoney, and now the Beach Boys."

== Legacy ==
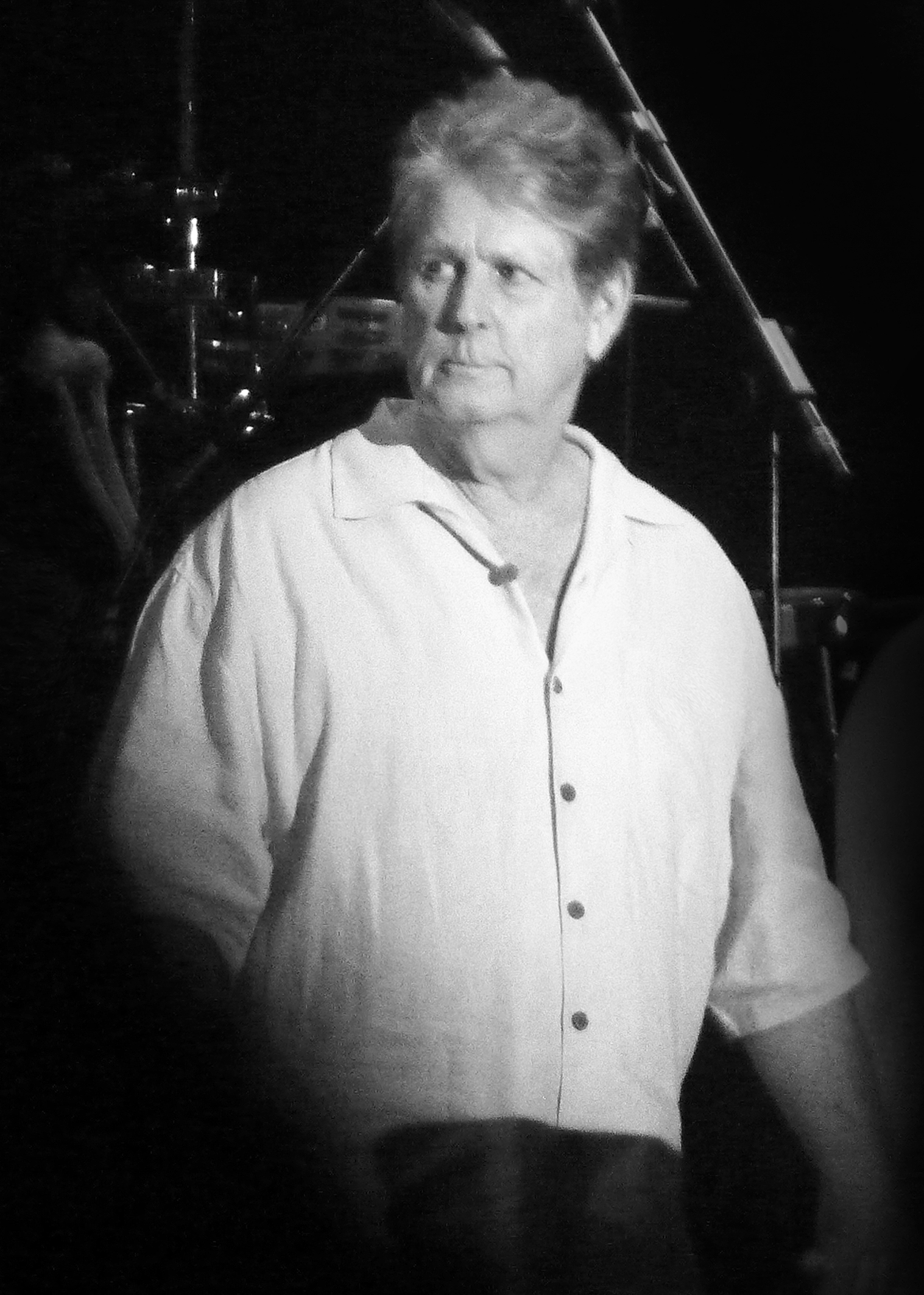
The song remains closely identified with Wilson's personal life

"I Just Wasn't Made for These Times" remains one of the Beach Boys' most favored songs among fans. Biographer Mark Dillon said that it had "become something of a life statement [for Wilson]", while biographer Peter Ames Carlin referred to the song as "the overture for a decades-long saga that would be, in its way, as influential as Pet Sounds had been [...] Ultimately, Brian's public suffering had transformed him from a musical figure into a cultural one."

The Beach Boys revisited the Electro-Theremin for two more songs, "Good Vibrations" (1966), an outtake from Pet Sounds that was released as a single, and "Wild Honey", another single that served as the title track of their 1967 album. Tanner was reenlisted for the recording of both tracks. (Note: He played on the first session for "Good Vibrations", held only three days after the recording of "I Just Wasn't Made for These Times".)

In 1995, musician Don Was used "I Just Wasn't Made for These Times" as the title of his Brian Wilson-focused documentary, and in turn, the title of the film's soundtrack (also Wilson's second solo album). In the 1990s, Wilson and collaborator Andy Paley recorded a spiritual successor to the song, titled "It's Not Easy Bein' Me". The song was released on the soundtrack to the 2021 documentary Brian Wilson: Long Promised Road.

Wilson was asked in a 2011 interview if he had still felt that he "wasn't made for these times". He responded, "It was like saying: 'Either I'm too far ahead of my time' or 'I'm not up to my time.' [The feeling has] stayed the same [...] a little bit, in some ways not [...] [Now] I do feel I was made for these times."

== In popular culture ==
- In 2012, the song was used to underscore an LSD sequence in an episode of the television drama Mad Men ("Far Away Places").

== Personnel ==
Per band archivist Craig Slowinski.

The Beach Boys

- Al Jardine – backing vocals
- Bruce Johnston – backing vocals
- Mike Love – backing vocals
- Brian Wilson – lead and backing vocals; producer
- Carl Wilson – backing vocals
- Dennis Wilson – backing vocals

Session musicians

- Chuck Berghofer – upright bass
- Hal Blaine – drums, timpani
- Glen Campbell – rhythm guitar
- Frank Capp – temple blocks, cup with sticks
- Steve Douglas – clarinet
- Plas Johnson – piccolo
- Bobby Klein – clarinet
- Mike Melvoin – harpsichord
- Jay Migliori – bass clarinet
- Tommy Morgan – bass harmonica
- Barney Kessel – mando-guitar
- Ray Pohlman – bass guitar
- Don Randi – tack piano
- Paul Tanner – Electro-Theremin

Technical staff

- Larry Levine – engineer (track)
- Ralph Valentin – engineer (vocals)

== Bibliography ==
- Badman, Keith (2004). The Beach Boys: The Definitive Diary of America's Greatest Band, on Stage and in the Studio. Backbeat Books. ISBN 978-0-87930-818-6.
- Brend, Mark (2005). Strange Sounds: Offbeat Instruments and Sonic Experiments in Pop. Backbeat. ISBN 9780879308551.
- Carlin, Peter Ames (2006). Catch a Wave: The Rise, Fall, and Redemption of the Beach Boys' Brian Wilson. Rodale. ISBN 978-1-59486-320-2.
- Dillon, Mark (2012). Fifty Sides of the Beach Boys: The Songs That Tell Their Story. ECW Press. ISBN 978-1-77090-198-8.
- Everett, Walter (2008). The Foundations of Rock: From "Blue Suede Shoes" to "Suite: Judy Blue Eyes". Oxford University Press. ISBN 978-0199718702.
- Gaines, Steven (1986). Heroes and Villains: The True Story of The Beach Boys. New York: Da Capo Press. ISBN 0306806479.
- Granata, Charles L. (2003). Wouldn't It Be Nice: Brian Wilson and the Making of the Beach Boys' Pet Sounds. A Cappella Books. ISBN 9781556525070.
- Kirkey, Christopher (2019). "Good Authentic Vibrations: The Beach Boys, California, and Pet Sounds". In Lovell, Jane; Hitchmough, Sam (eds.). Authenticity in North America: Place, Tourism, Heritage, Culture and the Popular Imagination. Taylor & Francis. pp. 41–60. ISBN 978-0-429-80234-8.
- Lambert, Philip (2007). Inside the Music of Brian Wilson: the Songs, Sounds, and Influences of the Beach Boys' Founding Genius. Continuum. ISBN 978-0-8264-1876-0.
- Lambert, Philip (March 2008). "Brian Wilson's Pet Sounds". Twentieth-Century Music. 5 (1). Cambridge University Press: 109–133. doi:10.1017/S1478572208000625. S2CID 162871617. Archived from the original on October 2, 2021.
- Lambert, Philip, ed. (2016). Good Vibrations: Brian Wilson and the Beach Boys in Critical Perspective. University of Michigan Press. doi:10.3998/mpub.9275965. ISBN 978-0-472-11995-0.
- Priore, Domenic (1997). "The Brian Wilson Productions, Mid 90s Style". In Abbott, Kingsley (ed.). Back to the Beach: A Brian Wilson and the Beach Boys Reader. Helter Skelter. ISBN 978-1900924023.
- Priore, Domenic (2005). Smile: The Story of Brian Wilson's Lost Masterpiece. London: Sanctuary. ISBN 1860746276.
- Stanley, Bob (2013). Yeah Yeah Yeah: The Story of Modern Pop. Faber & Faber. ISBN 978-0-571-28198-5.
- Tobler, John (1978). The Beach Boys. Chartwell Books. ISBN 0890091749.
