= Paul Tanner =

American jazz trombonist (1917–2013)

- Tanner with the Electro-Theremin.

Background information
- Born: October 15, 1917; Skunk Hollow, Kentucky, United States
- Died: February 5, 2013 (aged 95) Carlsbad, California, United States
- Genre: Jazz
- Occupations: Musician; inventor; educator; author
- Instruments: Trombone; Electro-Theremin

External videos
- Oral History, Paul Tanner shares moments of his life story and career. Interview date May 18, 2001, NAMM Oral History Library

Paul Tanner (October 15, 1917 – February 5, 2013) was an American musician and a member of the Glenn Miller Orchestra. He developed and played the Electro-Theremin, a theremin soundalike instrument that is best known for its use on the Beach Boys 1966 songs "I Just Wasn't Made for These Times," "Good Vibrations," and "Wild Honey".

== Early life ==
Paul Ora Warren Tanner was born on October 15, 1917, in Skunk Hollow, Campbell County, Kentucky. Tanner had five brothers, and each could play an instrument. Tanner learned to play the trombone at a reform school where his father was employed as superintendent. Tanner and his brothers were playing in what he described as a "strip joint" when Miller heard him and offered him a position in his band.

== Career ==
Tanner gained fame as a trombonist, playing with Glenn Miller and His Orchestra from 1938 to 1942, the group's entire duration. When it disbanded, Tanner joined the U.S. Army Air Force, becoming a part of the 378th Army Service Forces Band at Ft Slocum, New York. He later worked as a studio musician in Hollywood.

Tanner earned three degrees at University of California, Los Angeles – a bachelor's in 1958 (graduating magna cum laude), a master's in 1961, and a doctorate in 1975. He also was influential in launching UCLA's highly regarded jazz education program in 1958. He then became a professor at UCLA and also authored or co-authored several academic and popular histories related to jazz.

== Electro-Theremin ==
He developed and played the Electro-Theremin, an electronic musical instrument that mimics the sound of the theremin. He can be heard performing on the opening title theme music of the 1963–66 CBS-TV comedy series My Favorite Martian. The Electro-Theremin is featured on several 1966–1967 recordings by The Beach Boys, with Tanner as the guest player; most notably on the Capitol Records singles "Good Vibrations", "Wild Honey", in the album track "I Just Wasn't Made For These Times", and in Dennis Wilson's song "Tune L" found in the 1967 archival release "1967 – Sunshine Tomorrow".

== Death ==
Tanner died of pneumonia on February 5, 2013, at the age of 95. He was the fourth-to-last surviving member of the Glenn Miller Orchestra, being surpassed by bassist Trigger Alpert, who died ten months later, trombonist Nat Peck, who died in 2015, and trumpeter Ray Anthony, who is living.

== Bibliography ==
- Jazz, with Maurice Gerow and David W. Megill (1964, W. C. Brown / 2009, McGraw-Hill; ISBN 978-0-07-340137-9)
- Every Night Was New Year's Eve: On the Road With Glenn Miller . With Bill Cox (1992, Cosmo Space Co., Ltd. Tokyo. ISBN 4-947544-08-2)
