= Electro-Theremin =

Electronic musical instrument

- Paul Tanner with the Electro-Theremin.

Electronic instrument
- Inventor(s): Paul Tanner, Bob Whitsell
- Developed: 1950s

The Electro-Theremin is an electronic musical instrument developed by trombonist Paul Tanner and amateur inventor Bob Whitsell in the late 1950s to produce a sound to mimic that of the theremin. It was also known as the "Tannerin." The instrument features a tone and portamento similar to that of the theremin, but with a different control mechanism. It consisted of a sine wave generator with a knob that controlled the pitch, placed inside a wooden box. The pitch knob was attached to a slider on the outside of the box with some string. The player would move the slider, thus turning the knob to the desired frequency, with the help of markings drawn on the box. This contrasts with the theremin, which a performer plays without touching as two antennas sense the position and movement of the performer's hands.

== Background ==
The instrument was custom-built at Tanner's request. Tanner appreciated the theremin's sound, but wanted greater control of pitch and attack. The Electro-Theremin uses mechanical controls, a long slide bar for the pitch (analogous to the slide of the trombone that was Tanner's main instrument) and a knob to adjust volume. This contrasts with the hand movements in space that formed the original theremin's signal feature. The Electro-Theremin also produces a slightly less complex timbre than the original.

Tanner played it for the 1958 LP record Music for Heavenly Bodies, the first full-length album featuring the instrument, and played it subsequently on several television and movie soundtracks, including George Greeley's theme for the 1960s TV series My Favorite Martian and on an LP record titled Music from Outer Space.

Tanner played his Electro-Theremin on three songs by the Beach Boys: "I Just Wasn't Made for These Times", "Good Vibrations" and "Wild Honey". The instrument used in these songs was based on a Heathkit tube–type audio oscillator generating a relatively simple sine wave as compared to the more complex violin-like tone of the original theremin.

Tanner's prototype Electro-Theremin appears to have been only one of two ever made. In the late 1960s, Tanner donated or sold the instrument to a hospital to use for audiology work, because he believed that newer keyboard synthesizers made it obsolete.

== Tannerin ==
In 1999, Tom Polk built a replica of the original Electro-Theremin for Brian Wilson's solo tour of that year. Polk called his instrument the Tannerin in honor of the original creator and performer.
