= Wild Honey (The Beach Boys song) =

- West German picture sleeve

Single by the Beach Boys

from the album Wild Honey
- B-side: "Wind Chimes"
- Released: October 23, 1967
- Recorded: September 26–27, 1967
- Studio: Beach Boys Studio, Los Angeles
- Length: 2:37
- Label: Capitol
- Songwriters: Brian Wilson, Mike Love
- Producer: The Beach Boys

The Beach Boys singles chronology
"Heroes and Villains" (1967)	"Wild Honey" (1967)	"Darlin'" (1967)

"Wild Honey" is a song recorded by the American rock band the Beach Boys. Written by Brian Wilson and Mike Love, it was released as the lead single from their 1967 album Wild Honey, with the B-side of the single being "Wind Chimes". The single peaked at number 31 in the U.S. and number 29 in the U.K.

== Composition ==
In a 1992 issue of Goldmine, Mike Love explained the idea for the lyrics of the song:

Brian was doing this track with a Theremin and we were doing the song. I went into the kitchen and we were in this health food thing and wild honey was all natural. So there's this can of wild honey and we're making some tea. So I said, I'll write the lyrics about this girl who was a wild little honey. And I wrote it from the perspective that that album was Brian's R&B-influenced album, in his mind. It may not sound like it to a Motown executive but that was where he was coming from on that record. In that particular instance I wrote it from the perspective of Stevie Wonder singing it.

== Recording ==
Recording for the song began on September 26, 1967 at Brian Wilson's home studio in Bel Air, California with Jim Lockert engineering the session. The song would be almost completely recorded in three days. The band started with piano, guitar, bass and drums, followed by a simple organ part and percussion. The band then added an Electro-Theremin and re-did the drums, in which Dennis Wilson's bass drum was recorded in a hallway. The session then concluded with the band doing all vocal overdubs and Bruce Johnston performing the organ solo.

== Reception ==
Billboard described the single as an "easy rocker with a steady and solid dance beat." Cash Box said that it's a "thumping, pulsing ditty."

== Variations ==
The song was first released as a single on October 23, 1967, with "Wind Chimes" as its B-side (except in Greece, where 1965's "The Girl from New York City" was the B-side). It was then released as the first track on Wild Honey in December of the same year. The following year, the song's backing track was released on the Stack-O-Tracks album. The song has appeared on several of the groups greatest hits compilations including the 1999 compilation album The Greatest Hits - Volume 2: 20 More Good Vibrations; the 2003 compilation Sounds of Summer: The Very Best of The Beach Boys as well as the 1993 box set Good Vibrations: Thirty Years of The Beach Boys.

== Personnel ==
Credits per John Brode, Will Crerar, Joshilyn Hoisington, and Craig Slowinski.

The Beach Boys

- Bruce Johnston - backing vocals, Farfisa organ (solo), bass guitar
- Mike Love - backing vocals
- Brian Wilson - co-lead and backing vocals, grand piano, Farfisa organ, tambourine, congas
- Carl Wilson - lead and backing vocals, 12-string acoustic guitar
- Dennis Wilson - backing vocals, drums, bongos

Additional musician

- Paul Tanner - Electro-Theremin

== Charts ==
Chart (1968)	Peak position
Australian Singles Chart	10
New Zealand Singles Chart	11
UK Singles Chart	29
U.S. Billboard Hot 100	31
U.S. Cashbox Top 100	22
