= Good Vibrations =

1966 single by the Beach Boys

- U.S. picture sleeve

Single by the Beach Boys
- B-side: "Let's Go Away for Awhile"
- Released: October 10, 1966
- Recorded: February 17 – September 21, 1966
- Studio: Western, Columbia, and Gold Star, Hollywood
- Genre: Progressive pop; rock; psychedelia; R&B
- Length: 3:35
- Label: Capitol
- Songwriters: Brian Wilson; Mike Love
- Producer: Brian Wilson

The Beach Boys singles chronology
"Wouldn't It Be Nice" (1966)	"Good Vibrations" (1966)	"Heroes and Villains" (1967)

Music video
- "Good Vibrations" on YouTube

Audio sample
- file; help

"Good Vibrations" is a song by the American rock band the Beach Boys, produced and composed by Brian Wilson with lyrics by Mike Love and, in some published versions, by Tony Asher. Promoted as a "pocket symphony", it was released as a single on October 10, 1966 and became an immediate critical and commercial success, topping national charts in the United States, United Kingdom, and several other countries. It is commonly regarded as one of the greatest works of rock, pop, and psychedelia.

Wilson was inspired by the concept of extrasensory perception and Phil Spector's production of "You've Lost That Lovin' Feelin'" in creating the song. He produced dozens of music fragments (or "modules") with his bandmates and over 30 session musicians across four Hollywood studios from February to September 1966. Over 90 hours of tape were consumed, with production costs estimated in the tens of thousands of dollars, making it the costliest and longest-to-record pop single at the time. The resulting track subverted typical pop song conventions through its use of development, abrupt shifts in texture and mood, and novel instrumentation, including electronic sounds and a juddering cello rhythm in its refrain.

One of the most influential recordings in popular music history, "Good Vibrations" is credited with advancing the role of the studio as an instrument and elevating the recognition of popular music as an art form. It effectively launched the progressive pop genre, heralding a wave of pop experimentation and the onset of psychedelic and progressive rock, and its use of Electro-Theremin—although not a true theremin—spurred renewed interest in theremins and synthesizers. The flower power-inspired lyrics reinforced the Beach Boys' association with the 1960s counterculture, while the phrase "good vibes", originally a niche slang term, entered mainstream usage.

Wilson subsequently pursued increasingly avant-garde directions and extended his modular approach to the unfinished album Smile and follow-up single "Heroes and Villains". Despite his objections to its inclusion, "Good Vibrations" instead appeared on the 1967 release Smiley Smile. A 1976 cover version by Todd Rundgren reached number 34 on U.S. charts.

== Background and authorship ==
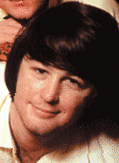
"Good Vibrations" was written mainly by Brian Wilson (pictured 1966)

"Good Vibrations" was composed by Beach Boys leader Brian Wilson, who conceived the song while playing piano under the influence of marijuana. The song was essentially a reflection of his fascination with mysticism, spirituality, and recreational drugs. (Note: Wilson remembered that he had used drugs to enhance his creativity, stating "If I can create Pet Sounds on drugs, I can create something [even] greater on drugs.") The title phrase ("good vibrations" or "good vibes") had originated as local drug slang. (Note: Derek Taylor wrote, "It was around The Byrds and their followers that I first heard of 'vibrations', 'vibes', as in 'good' and 'bad'. A young writer called Paul Jay Robbins sent a contribution to my publicity campaign. It was an essay, in which he explained at considerable length the meaning of the new phrase, 'where it's at'.") In a 2007 interview, Wilson mentioned that the song, like "California Girls", had been inspired by his use of LSD (or "acid"). However, in a 2012 interview, he attributed its inspiration to marijuana, saying, "I don't accredit it to LSD, I accredit it to marijuana. I smoked marijuana just before I wrote it."

[My mother] told me about dogs that would bark at people and then not bark at others, that a dog would pick up vibrations from these people that you can't see, but you can feel. [...] I didn't really understand too much of what it meant when I was just a boy. It scared me, the word "vibrations."

— Brian Wilson, 1976

Recorded throughout early 1966 and released that May, the Beach Boys' eleventh album, Pet Sounds, had marked a shift in Wilson's creative process. His 1991 memoir, Wouldn't It Be Nice: My Own Story, states, "I had a lot of unfinished ideas, fragments of music I called 'feels.' Each feel represented a mood or an emotion I'd felt, and I planned to fit them together like a mosaic." He based the song's theme on a remark from his mother about dogs sensing "vibrations" from people. (Note: During the particularly laborious recording sessions for Pet Sounds, Mike Love had affectionately nicknamed Wilson "dog ears", a reference to a canine's ability to detect sounds far beyond the limits of human hearing. Wilson also closed the album with sounds of his own barking dogs, heard at the end of "Caroline, No".)

Wilson introduced this concept to jingle writer and Pet Sounds lyricist Tony Asher in early 1966, before the album was completed. Asher recalled, "Brian played for me a bunch of chords that would become "Good Vibrations." He didn't have a title for it [...]". Initially, Wilson had only the basic chorus and the phrase "I get vibes, I get good vibes". He proposed the title "Good Vibes", but Asher felt it sounded "trendy" and "lightweight", suggesting "Good Vibrations" instead. Asher also crafted the chorus lyrics into "Good, good, good, good vibrations" and wrote more words for the verses.

Due to Wilson's dissatisfaction, Asher's verse lyrics were ultimately discarded in favor of a new set of lyrics penned by bandmate Mike Love. (Note: Asher recalled that before completing Pet Sounds, Wilson's bandmates had believed collaborating with him was a poor choice, leading to the song's temporary unfinished state. Clinton Heylin alternatively offers that Wilson was deterred from working with Asher because of Asher's disinterest in using LSD.) After some delay, Love completed the lyrics to "Good Vibrations" on August 24, 1966 during a twenty-minute drive to the studio. (Note: Wilson had given Love an acetate of the track, although Love remembered, "I didn't have much time, as Brian kept making changes on the track until he gave it to me. I also tend to procrastinate. As a result I hadn't written anything until the day that we were supposed to record the vocals.") He contributed lines for the verses and the chorus hook, "I'm picking up good vibrations / she's giving me excitations". While Love considered the chorus hook his "musical contribution", he had adapted its melody from Wilson's existing bass line.

== Composition ==
"Good Vibrations" is a pop, rock, psychedelic, and R&B song. By the mid-2010s, It was more frequently identified as pop rather than rock. Academic Candelaria suggests, "possibly because it comes across relatively innocent compared with the hard-edged rock we have since come to know." Wilson acknowledged, "It's a real funny thing—nobody ever really called 'Good Vibrations' a rock 'n' roll record. But it was a rock 'n' roll record. It really rocked." Biographer Jon Stebbins agreed, noting that the chorus "projects a definite 'rock and roll' energy and feel" unlike Pet Sounds. In his book about Kraftwerk, Steve Tupai Francis cited "Good Vibrations" as an example among pioneering works of electronic music. Other genres attributed to the song include progressive pop, art pop, pop art, psychedelic rock, acid rock, psychedelic pop, and avant-pop.

It had a lot of riff changes ... movements ... It was a pocket symphony—changes, changes, changes, building harmonies here, drop this voice out, this comes in, bring this echo in, put the theremin here, bring the cello up a little louder here ... It was the biggest production of our lives!

— Brian Wilson

Wilson also described it as "advanced rhythm and blues" and a "modern, avant-garde R&B" song that "goes through stages" similar to the Righteous Brothers' 1964 hit "You've Lost That Lovin' Feelin'", produced by Phil Spector, whose work on that song Wilson aimed to surpass. (Note: Wilson's 1991 memoir states that he had conceived "a grand, Spector-like production" for the song while influenced by LSD.) His brother Carl Wilson commented that "Good Vibrations" initially had "a much rougher sound", and that, rather than amplifying it as Spector might have, "Brian refined it, and got it more even-sounding." The bass riff was also inspired by those in Spector's work. An uncredited writer for Sound on Sound argued in 1997 that the song had subverted traditional pop songwriting practices across all eras by eschewing a consistent groove and incorporating exotic instruments, complex vocal arrangements, and "as many dramatic changes in mood as a piece of serious classical music lasting more than half an hour". AllMusic reviewer John Bush compared the track to the cut-up technique employed by experimental novelists such as William S. Burroughs. American Songwriter contributor Tom Rowland described "Good Vibrations" as "a sort of pop version of the classical sonata, consisting of a series of musical movements".

Comparing "Good Vibrations" to Wilson's past work, musicologist John Covach traces the song's "intensely experimental quality" to Wilson's lush, quasi-symphonic production of "California Girls". Musicologist Philip Lambert writes that the "basic feel" of the verses are similar to the Pet Sounds track "Here Today". Music historian Luis Sanchez writes, "In its conviction and nuance, there is little that distinguishes 'Good Vibrations' from ... Pet Sounds." Mike Love's first impression of "Good Vibrations" was that it sounded like the "very heavy R&B" associated with singer Wilson Pickett. In a 1978 interview, Love opined that the song was a logical progression after Pet Sounds, which itself "was rather sequential and logical after 'I Get Around'." However, in 2012, he recalled feeling apprehensive about the track's "avant-garde" quality, wondering how fans in regions like the Midwest or Birmingham would react, given its departure from earlier hits like "Surfin' U.S.A." and "Help Me, Rhonda".

Music journalist Jon Savage said it was "saturated in heightened perception", citing its abrupt shifts in mood and texture, in addition to its lyrical imagery of color, scent, and phrases such as "blossom" and "perfume", as an LSD-rooted exploration of nonverbal communication, telepathy, and extrasensory perception. Biographer Peter Ames Carlin believed Wilson viewed the song as "a smaller, psychedelic version" of George Gershwin's Rhapsody in Blue.

== Lyrics ==
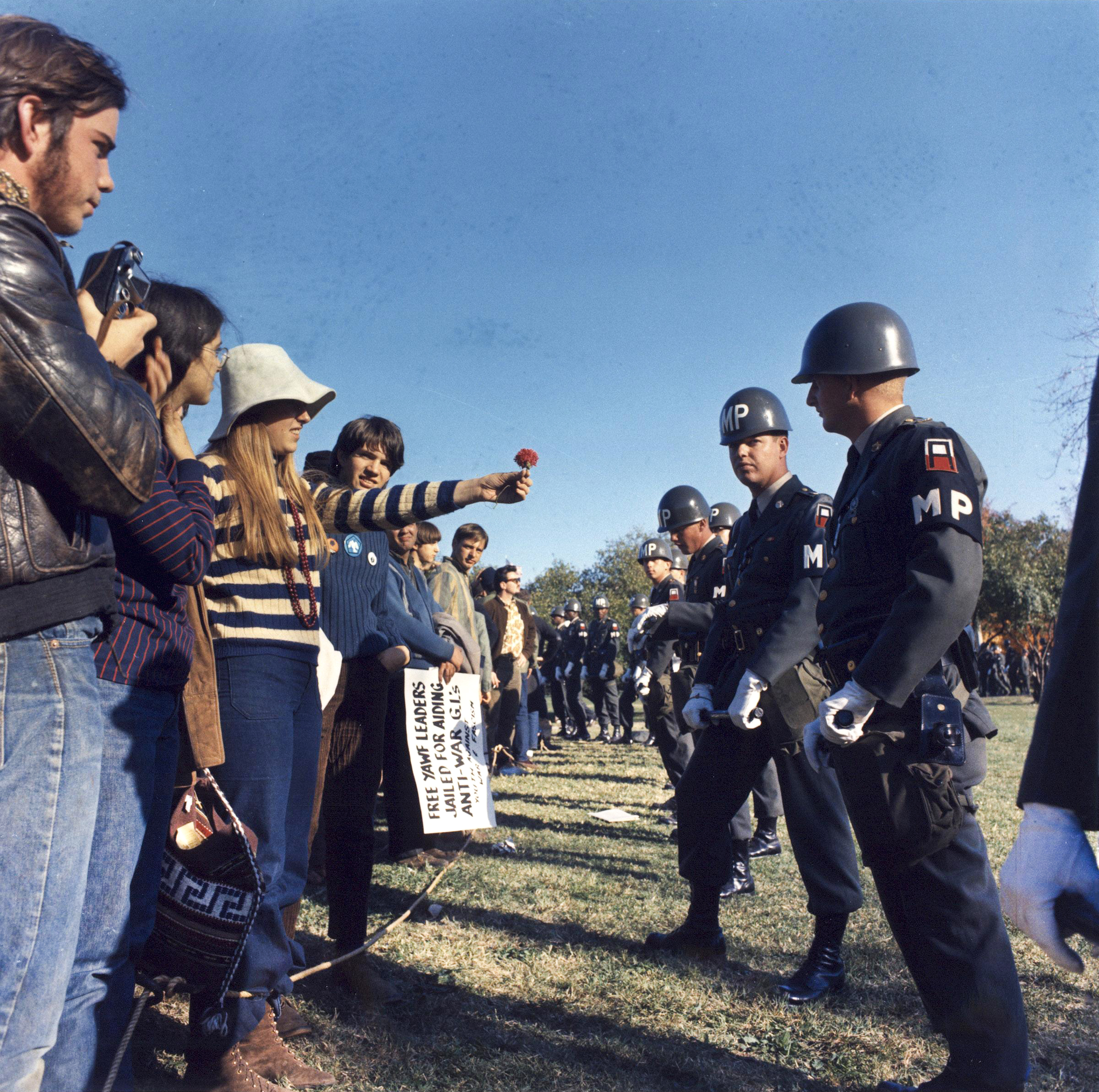
A group of Flower Power demonstrators (October 1967). Mike Love's lyrics were inspired by the peace movement burgeoning in California.

Mike Love described his "Good Vibrations" lyrics as "just a flowery poem" similar to the later 1967 hit "San Francisco (Be Sure to Wear Flowers in Your Hair)". "Good Vibrations" begins by describing a woman's "colorful clothes", sunlight on her hair, "the sound of a gentle word", and a breeze carrying her perfume's scent. These opening verses center on the material senses, which Wilson said was a deliberate contrast to the extrasensory themes later revealed in the chorus.

Tony Asher's original lyrics differed, with the first verse stating, "She's already working on my brain / I only looked in her eyes / But I picked up something I just can't explain", and the second verse, "It's weird how she comes in so strong / And I wonder what she's pickin' up from me". Interpreting these early lyrics, music historian Clinton Heylin surmised that it was "clearly a song about a girl who affects the singer" to an effect similar to the influence of a psychedelic drug. (Note: Heylin extended this interpretation to the phrase "blossom world", writing that it retained elements of the "hallucinogenic quality" Wilson had envisioned.) Asher recalled that, when writing the song, he had understood it to be about the "metaphysical, about ESP and picking up non-verbal communication" and, at that early stage, no psychedelic reference had been intended.

In Love's revision of the second verse, he wrote, "Softly smile, I know she must be kind / When I look in her eyes / She goes with me to a blossom world we find". Wilson removed the concluding words "we find" during editing. Love felt that while he preferred the original rhyme, ending on "blossom world" was enough to evoke the burgeoning peace movement and the euphoria of love. (Note: Alternative interpretations have been offered. Academic Larry M. Starr suggests that, while relatively conventional, the lyrics of "Good Vibrations" possess an otherworldly quality, especially in such lines as "I don't know where, but she sends me there", references to "a blossom world", and the concept of "good vibrations" themselves. Lorren Daro, a former acquaintance of Wilson's, wrote in a 2012 blog post that the song was "written about my wife, Lynda", explaining that because he had supplied LSD to Wilson, "Brian could not mention my name in public, or to any of them, except in 'regretting' his LSD experience." During a 1971 concert, Bruce Johnston introduced "Good Vibrations" as a song that "reflects these really fucked up times".)

By August 1966, Wilson had recruited session musician Van Dyke Parks as his lyricist for the Beach Boys' forthcoming album, Smile. Parks recalled Wilson asking him to revise Love's words because "he was embarrassed with the 'excitation' part Mike Love had insisted on adding." Parks declined, believing "nobody'd be listening to the lyrics anyway once they heard that music." Love later said, "I'll be the first to acknowledge that excitations is not really a word, but it rhymed."

== Production ==
=== Recording process ===
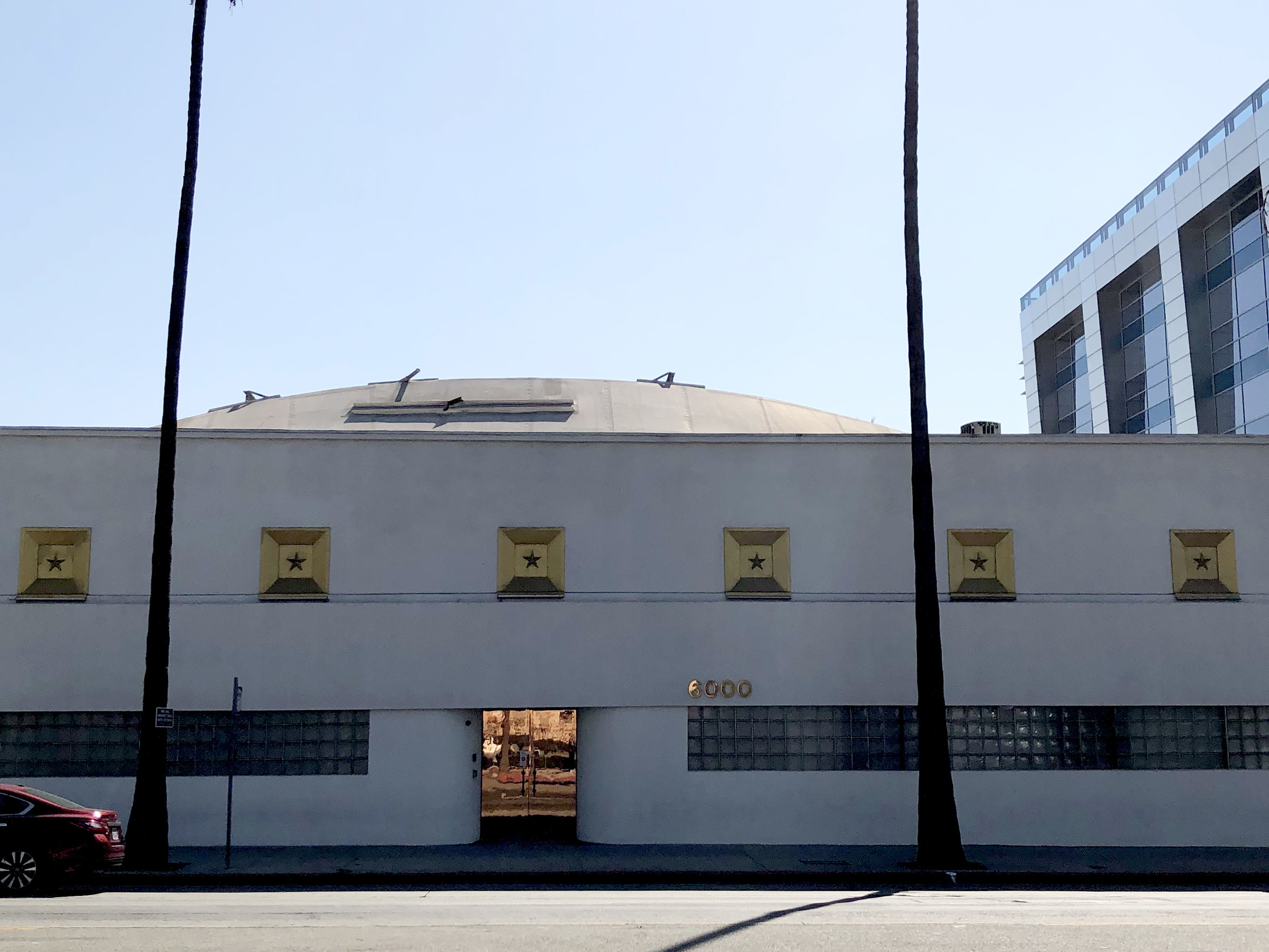
"Good Vibrations" was largely recorded at Western Studio on Sunset Boulevard (pictured 2019)

"Good Vibrations" cemented Wilson's new method of recording and song composition. Instead of working on whole songs with clear large-scale syntactical structures, Wilson limited himself to recording short interchangeable fragments (or "modules"). Through tape splicing, each fragment could then be assembled into a linear sequence, allowing for any number of larger structures and divergent moods to be produced at a later time. (Note: Wilson later extended this modular approach to the albums Smile and Smiley Smile.) It also allowed for sections to be reused within the composition. (Note: In "Good Vibrations", the instrumental backing for the choruses and the first two verses were identical recordings repeated multiple times.) To conceal tape splices, reverb decays were applied during mixing and sub-mixing stages.

The overall recording sessions extended longer than that of any previous pop single. At a time when pop singles were typically recorded within two days, the production of "Good Vibrations" spanned approximately 20 recording sessions across four Hollywood studios over seven months. Western staff engineer Chuck Britz said the first attempt was "basically a [finished] hit song" before Wilson reconsidered the recording and invested his "whole life's performance" into a more novel direction Wilson explained that the prolonged sessions stemmed from experimenting with different studios, as each facility had its own distinct character he considered crucial to the final sound of the record. He added that its lengthy production schedule was due to their evolving creative ambitions: "the more we created, the more we wanted to create ... there was no real set direction we were going in." Biographer Mark Dillon compared his method to "a film director finding his story in the editing room", with an array of "wildly disparate" pieces that ranged from "woodwind-based Eastern mysticism to Sunday morning church service to comical Roaring Twenties jazz. ... The transitions between fragments were sometimes seamless, other times startling in their juxtaposition of tone and tempo."

Wilson transcribed his music parts onto sheet music for his usual circle of Hollywood session musicians, a group later known as "the Wrecking Crew". The musicians were enlisted for several months without knowing what the finished track would sound like, recalled by drummer Hal Blaine as a stark contrast to their two-take recording of the seven-minute "MacArthur Park" (1967). The project consumed over 90 hours of recording tape, and Carlin writes that Wilson concluded some sessions without having recorded anything.

This approach was unprecedented in record production and popular music, including jazz, classical recordings, and soundtracks, and, according to Stebbins, reflected a more classically-minded approach to pop production. Mark Linett, who engineered Wilson's recordings after the 1980s, later said that although Wilson was not the first to use editing techniques, it was unusual at the time to record a song in several short sections before assembling it; he also advanced that Wilson had "invented" this component of what later became a standard recording practice.

Wilson reported that some bandmates "had resisting ideas" and "didn't quite understand" his use of different studios or his vision for the final record. The group had been marred by creative tensions during the preceding Pet Sounds sessions, and he recounted their objections being the song was "too modern" and "too long". (Note: His 1991 memoir described Jardine, Carl, and Love as having mixed or negative reactions. In a 2012 interview, he indicated that the band had met beforehand with the shared intention of expanding their repertoire beyond surf and car songs and create music with lasting significance. 'In a 1976 Rolling Stone interview, Dennis Wilson said the prolonged recording sessions coincided with his brother "losing his mind" to the extent that, in one instance, he declared the tapes lost after mistakenly arriving at the wrong studio.)

=== Pet Sounds sessions (February−April) ===
Wilson envisioned using a theremin, an instrument he described as articulating a sound "like a woman's voice or like a violin bow on a carpenter's saw", early in the song's production. On February 15, 1966, he recorded the backing track for "I Just Wasn't Made for These Times", marking his first use of the Electro-Theremin, an electronic theremin-soundalike instrument played by its inventor, Paul Tanner.

"Good Good Good Vibrations"
Excerpt from a discarded alternate edit of "Good Vibrations" created on March 3, 1966. Musicologist Philip Lambert noted this version's "driving beat" and "bluesy" vocals, likening it to Motown records.

On February 17, Wilson recorded the first version of "Good Vibrations" (logged on the AFM contract as "Untitled #1") at Gold Star Studios. Tanner was again employed on Electro-Theremin; maintaining a consistent volume on the instrument had proved difficult, requiring 26 takes before a rough mono mix was completed. On March 3, Brian and Carl Wilson overdubbed vocals, along with additional Fender bass in the chorus and jaw harp.

A Capitol Records memo dated February 23 indicated plans to include the song, titled "Good Good Good Vibrations", on Pet Sounds. However, by March 3, the song remained unfinished, and Wilson removed it from the album despite objections from his bandmates. Al Jardine recalled that Wilson instead delivered "Sloop John B" after Capitol had requested a "hit single" for the album. Jardine considered it "a big mistake", a view shared by Bruce Johnston, who believed including "Good Vibrations" would have bolstered sales of Pet Sounds.

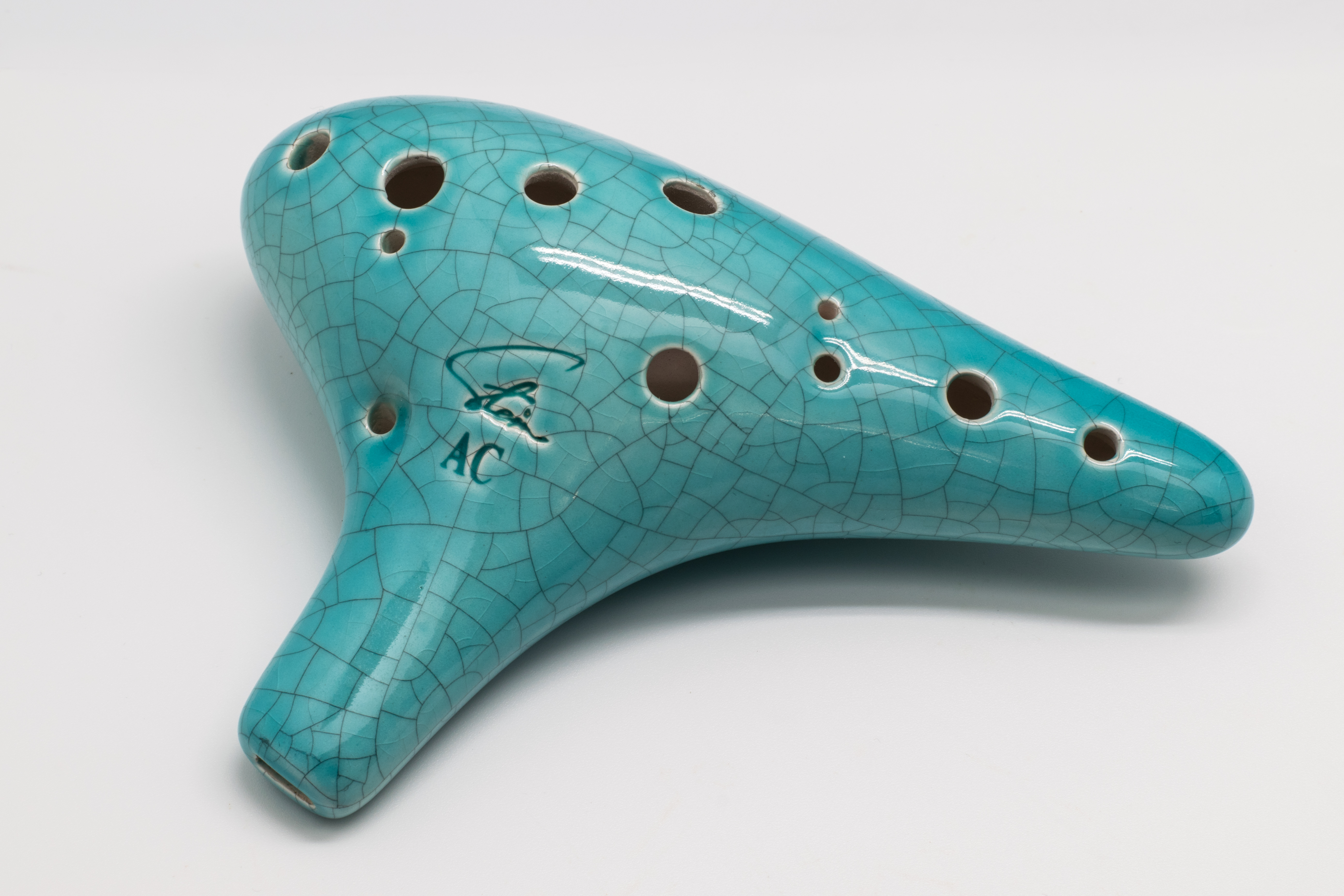
Several other instruments, including ocarina, were auditioned for the song.

In the following weeks, Wilson concentrated on finishing Pet Sounds. Later in March, he recorded "Here Today", which biographer Mark Dillon called "the most direct precursor [sic] to 'Good Vibrations'". On April 9, he returned to Gold Star to rerecord "Good Vibrations" from scratch. This version, lasting two minutes and 28 seconds, incorporated an ocarina, accordion, 12-string electric guitar, and a prepared piano with its strings taped, among other instruments. By the end of the month, Pet Sounds was completed and mastered without "Good Vibrations" in the running order.

=== First modular sessions (May−June) ===
I wanted to write a song with more than one level. Eventually, I would like to see longer singles—so that the song can be more meaningful. A song can, for instance, have movements—in the same way as a classical concerto—only capsulized.

— Brian Wilson, mid-1966

Starting on May 4, with a session held at Western Studio, Wilson began recording "Good Vibrations" in sections rather than as a full take, intending to later splice the fragments together. This session, logged as "First Chorus", "Second Chorus", and "Fade", involved the song's choruses, bridges, and outro. Music historian Keith Badman described this version as "an R&B number that many of the session musicians present will later recall as being as good as the released record."

Still dissatisfied, Wilson continued recording "Good Vibrations" fragments between May 24 and June 2 across four sessions at Western and Sunset Sound Recorders. These sessions yielded multiple choruses, bridges, and codas. By May 25, he had conceived the lyric "gotta keep those lovin' good ...". The late May sessions were labeled "Part C", "Chorus", and "Fade Sequence", while the June 2 tape was logged as "Inspiration".

David Anderle, then a talent manager formerly employed by MGM Records, recalled, "When I first got in with Brian, it was right around the time of the fourth [attempt at] 'Good Vibrations'. I heard it, and it knocked me out, and I said, "Uh oh, there's something happening here that is unbelievable." Later, Wilson told Anderle he had scrapped the song and planned to sell it to Warner Bros. Records as an R&B single earmarked for "a colored group". (Note: Some reports state that Brian had considered offering "Good Vibrations" to Atlantic Records artist Wilson Pickett. When asked about this in 1988, Wilson laughed and denied any knowledge of it.) Anderle proposed that Wilson finish the track for one of his clients, singer Danny Hutton, but Wilson declined and ultimately decided to complete it himself. (Note: According to Anderle, although he did not credit himself with inspiring Wilson to finish the song, he believed he may have given Wilson "a different perspective". On another occasion, he suggested the song may have remained unfinished. Wilson's 1991 memoir suggests Anderle's encouragement prompted him to "wrestle the damn thing to an end". Heylin said that Wilson may have hesitated because the lyrics had felt like a throwback to the Beach Boys' early themes of "cars and girls".)

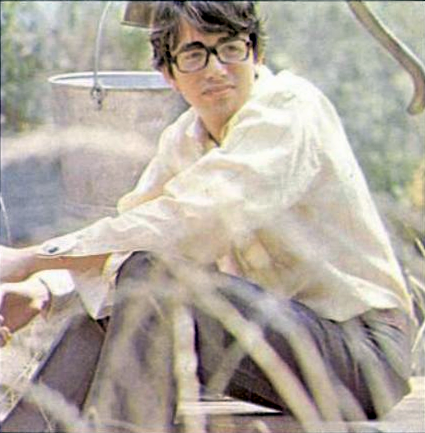
Van Dyke Parks (pictured 1967) said that his input on "Good Vibrations" led to his collaboration with Wilson on Smile

On June 12, session musician Jesse Ehrlich overdubbed a cello onto the June 2 "Inspiration" track. Reports differ on who had suggested the cello. Wilson credited himself with the "triplet thing" and his brother Carl for suggesting the instrument, while Parks claimed he had proposed both the cello and the triplet phrasing. Parks elaborated that his suggestion impressed Wilson, leading directly to their collaboration on Smile, and provided the piece with a "signature shot" as crucial as the ruby slippers from The Wizard of Oz (1939). On June 16 and 18, Wilson recorded more modules, none of which were included in the final edit. Afterward, he paused work on the song for nine weeks.

=== Vocals and final mixdown (August−September) ===
Carl Wilson told a reporter that "Good Vibrations" had been intended as the Beach Boys' next single, but "didn't turn out the way Brian wanted," leading Capitol to release "Wouldn't It Be Nice" on July 18 instead. Brian returned to the studio in early August, focusing on "Wind Chimes" and "Look", marking the unofficial start of the Smile sessions. Carlin suggested that Wilson was galvanized to complete the single after working with Parks on "Wind Chimes". (Note: Music journalist Barry Miles writes the Beatles' Revolver (released in the U.S. on August 8) influenced him to complete "Good Vibrations". However, Wilson rarely referenced the album.)

Wilson completed at least a dozen versions of "Good Vibrations" before settling on a final edit. (Note: Badman cites "between 15 and 20 different versions", while Leaf and Siegel cite 11.) On August 11, after the touring members of the Beach Boys had played a concert at the Civic Memorial Auditorium in Fargo, North Dakota, Carl received a call from Brian, who played a rough mix over the phone. Carl remembered, "He called me from the recording studio and played this really bizarre sounding music over the phone. There were drums smashing, that kind of stuff, and then it refined itself and got into the cello. It was a real funky track."

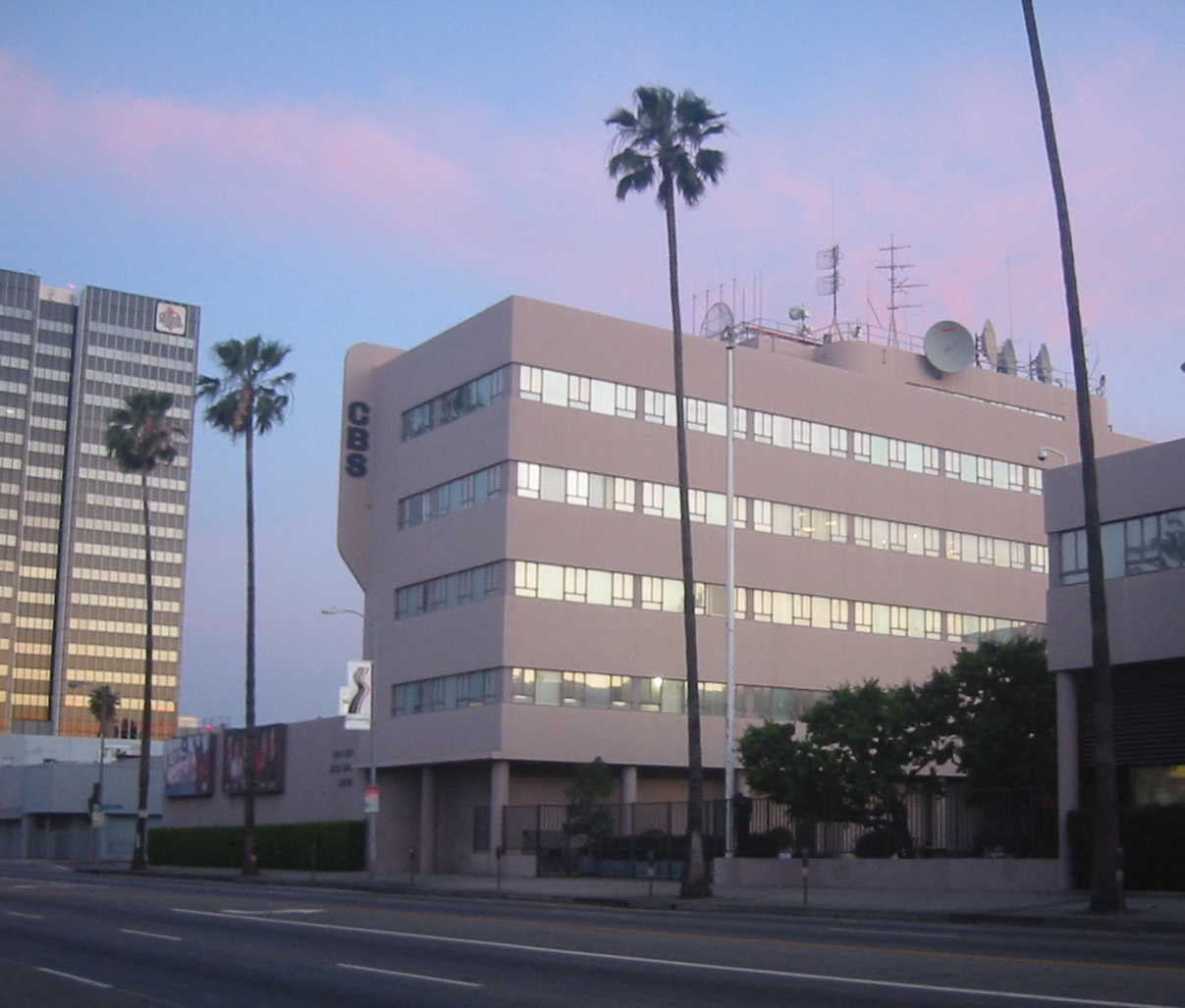
Columbia Studios, where the song's vocals and final mixdown were produced

Unused "fuzz bass bridge"
Excerpt from a discarded alternate edit of "Good Vibrations" created on August 24, 1966. Music journalist Dawn Eden characterized this version's fuzz bass as "so distorted that it sounds like a primitive Moog synthesizer".

At least two group vocal sessions took place at Columbia Studios between August 24 and September 1. Mike Love recalled recording "25 to 30 vocal overdubs" for brief sections of the song, "maybe no more than two, three, four, five seconds long!" A discarded August 24 edit featured a "fuzz bass bridge" that was nearly included in the final mix. Unsatisfied with the initial recordings, Wilson had the group rerecord their entire vocal performance.

On September 1, the second (or "church organ") bridge, replacing the earlier "fuzz bass bridge", was recorded at Western. (Note: Van Dyke Parks recalled contributing organ bass pedal sounds at this session, operating the pedals with his hands and knees.) That month, the master tapes of "Good Vibrations" briefly went missing before being found in Wilson's home two days later. The final backing track was compiled from multiple sessions:

- verses: February 17 at Gold Star
- first and second choruses: June 2 at Western
- first bridge: May 4 at Western
- '"church organ" bridge: September 1 at Western
- third chorus: June 2 at Western
- third bridge: May 27 at Western
- chorus fade: May 27 at Western

Dennis Wilson was originally set to record the lead vocal, but due to laryngitis, Carl took his place shortly before the final vocal sessions. The group recorded their final vocals on September 12, with an additional overdubbing session, including vocals and an Electro-Theremin part, held on September 21. This seven-hour session, from 7:00 p.m. to 3:00 a.m., also included the final mixdown. Brian, speaking in a 1976 interview, described finalizing the mix at Columbia as "a feeling of exaltation" and "artistic beauty", recalling that upon playback of the completed mix, he remarked to himself, "Oh my God. Sit back and listen to this!"

At 3:35, the song exceeded the three-minute limit typically imposed by record executives and radio programmers. Wilson, later in the 1990s, recalled that he initially had no expectation of "Good Vibrations" becoming a hit, and that the band had considered not releasing it, "because it was so bizarre". Capitol Records executives had expressed concerns about its length and preferred to issue a more conventional track like "Barbara Ann" instead. However, after playing the song for friends at home and seeing their enthusiastic reactions, Wilson was encouraged to push back against Capitol's hesitation. (Note: In 2012, Wilson stated, "The Capitol execs loved that tune. I remember the A&R man saying what a great pop record it was.")

=== Total expenses ===
"Good Vibrations" was the most expensive single ever recorded, exceeding the budget of a typical pop album. Mike Love remarked, "I doubt Brian had any idea about the cost, nor did he care". Estimates of the total production cost range from $10,000 to $50,000 (equivalent to $100,000 and $500,000 in 2025). By comparison, Pet Sounds had cost an unprecedented $70,000 (equivalent to $690,000 in 2025).

Contemporary advertisements cited a $10,000 cost. Biographers John Tobler and Timothy White reported $16,000, while Domenic Priore estimated between $10,000 and $15,000. Other reports claimed up to $75,000 (equivalent to $740,000 in 2025). In a 2018 interview, Wilson refuted the $50,000 figure, stating that the actual cost was closer to $25,000 (equivalent to $250,000 in 2025). (Note: Asked in a 2005 interview if the Electro-Theremin alone cost $100,000, Wilson replied "No. $15,000.")

== Musical structure ==
=== Opening verses and refrains ===
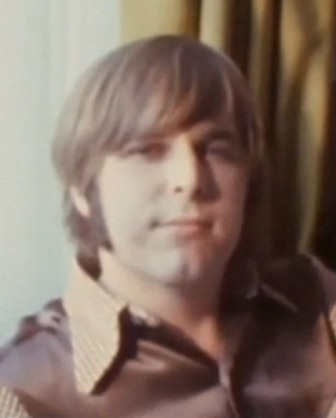
Carl Wilson (pictured 1969) sings lead during the verses and plays electric rhythm guitar during the choruses.

Each section of "Good Vibrations" has a separate musical texture partly due to the fragmented recording process. The song starts with a traditional verse-chorus (or verse-refrain) structure in the key of E♭ minor. The verse chord progression follows i–♭VII^{add6}–♭VI^{add6}–V, a whole-step root movement typical of Wilson's style, as heard in "Lonely Sea" (1963) and "Don't Hurt My Little Sister" (1965). Despite this minor key, the music does not convey sadness. Carl Wilson sings the word "I" as a triplet eighth note before the first downbeat. His introductory lead vocal, described by Dillon as "so airy it could be floating on a cloud of marijuana smoke", is later doubled by Brian on select lines ("I hear the sound of a ..." and "when I look ...").

A repetition of chords on a Hammond organ filtered through a Leslie speaker accompanies Carl's singing, with a two-bar Fender bass melody underneath. This sequence repeats (0:15), adding two piccolos sustaining over a descending flute line. Percussion includes bongo drums doubling the bass rhythm, while every fourth beat alternates between a tambourine and a bass-drum-and-snare combination. Though in 4/4, the rhythm has a triplet feel, often called a "shuffle beat" (or "threes over fours").

A passing D♭ (V) chord at the end of the verse prepares for the key modulation to the chorus. The chorus (0:25) shifts to the relative major key of G♭ major, functioning as ♭III in context. Carlin and Starr describe the theremin's introduction as evoking "vibrations" scattering on another plane. Adding to this impression, according to Bush, is "another delicious parallel—between the single's theme and its use of an instrument the player never even touched." A cello and string bass play a bowed tremolo triplet, an effect Everett calls "exceedingly rare" in pop music and the first known use of a cello in a rock song. Musician Jace Lasek commented, "In the 1960s, having the cello chug along like that was shocking. It was an innovative use of a classical instrument, but it still sounded like rock 'n' roll." Wilson likened the cello triplets to a similar effect in the Crystals' "Da Doo Ron Ron" (1963). Meanwhile, the Fender bass maintains a steady beat, with tom drums and tambourine providing a backbeat.

The chorus unfolds in four 4-bar sections, gradually building its vocal layers. It begins with the couplet, "I'm picking up good vibrations / she's giving me the excitation", sung by Mike Love in his bass-baritone register. Wilson likened Love's singing to the bass vocal on the Dell-Vikings' "Come Go with Me", while Love felt that there were similarities to the work of James Brown and the Famous Flames. The chorus repeats twice, adding harmonies—first with an "ooo bop bop", then with "good, good, good, good vibrations", each time ascending a whole step from G♭ to A♭ to B♭. The song then resolves to the verse, forming a perfect cadence back to E♭ minor. Unlike typical arrangements, the second verse and chorus repeat unchanged, without additional instrumentation or harmony layers.

=== Episodic digressions and coda ===
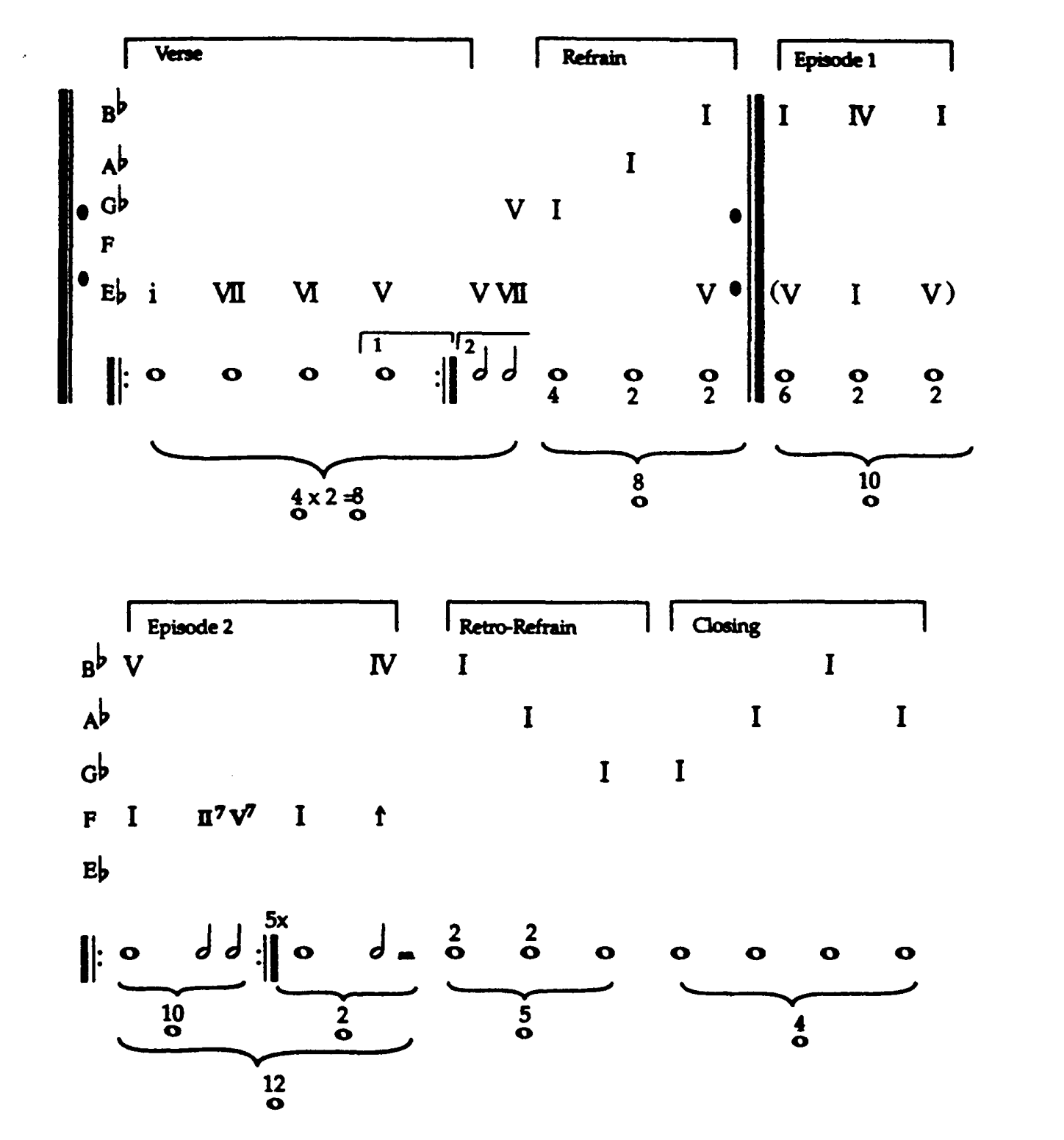
Formal and harmonic structure of "Good Vibrations" (diagram by Daniel Harrison)

The abstract structure of "Good Vibrations" complicates formal analysis of the next sections. In a typical song structure, the sections following the second refrain might function as a single extended bridge or two distinct bridge sections. Harrison termed it an "episodic digression", arguing that although the first part of the bridge is an unusual but plausible break between the verse and refrain, the second part challenges this interpretation, indicating a structure that evolves independently of standard song forms. Starr similarly describes its structure as unique and without a definitive classification, calling it as distinctive as the rest of the recording. He suggests that "development", a term typically associated with classical music, could best describe its form, which he partitions into sections designated as A, B, C, D, and "variations on B". (Note: Rooksby concurred that the song "is full of development", a "rare" feature in popular music.) Covach, using numerical labels in his formal analysis, states that while the song does not conform to conventional pop forms, it broadly follows a pattern in which contrasting material appears after the second chorus.

The verse section does not recur for the remainder of the song. According to Starr, this is one of the more "surprising" elements of the formal structure, explaining that it "works because of subtle interconnections that are established among the different musical sections", such as overlapping vocal textures in the bridge (C section) that recall the chorus. The last chord of the second chorus, B♭, which functioned as a dominant (V), is retained as a tonic (I) in the first part of the bridge. The harmonic progression is ambiguous, interpretable as either I–IV–I (in B♭) or V–I–V (in E♭). A new texture emerges with tack piano, jaw harp, and a bass accenting strong beats. At 1:55, this is expanded with electric organ, bass harmonica, and sleigh bells on every beat. The only lyric, aside from non-lexical harmonies, is "I don't know where, but she sends me there," sung in Love's upper-register baritone. This section spans ten measures (6 + 2 + 2), an unusually extended phrase given the song's earlier patterns. Lambert characterized this passage as the song's "ascent" and "dream sequence", followed by a "meditation" in the next section.

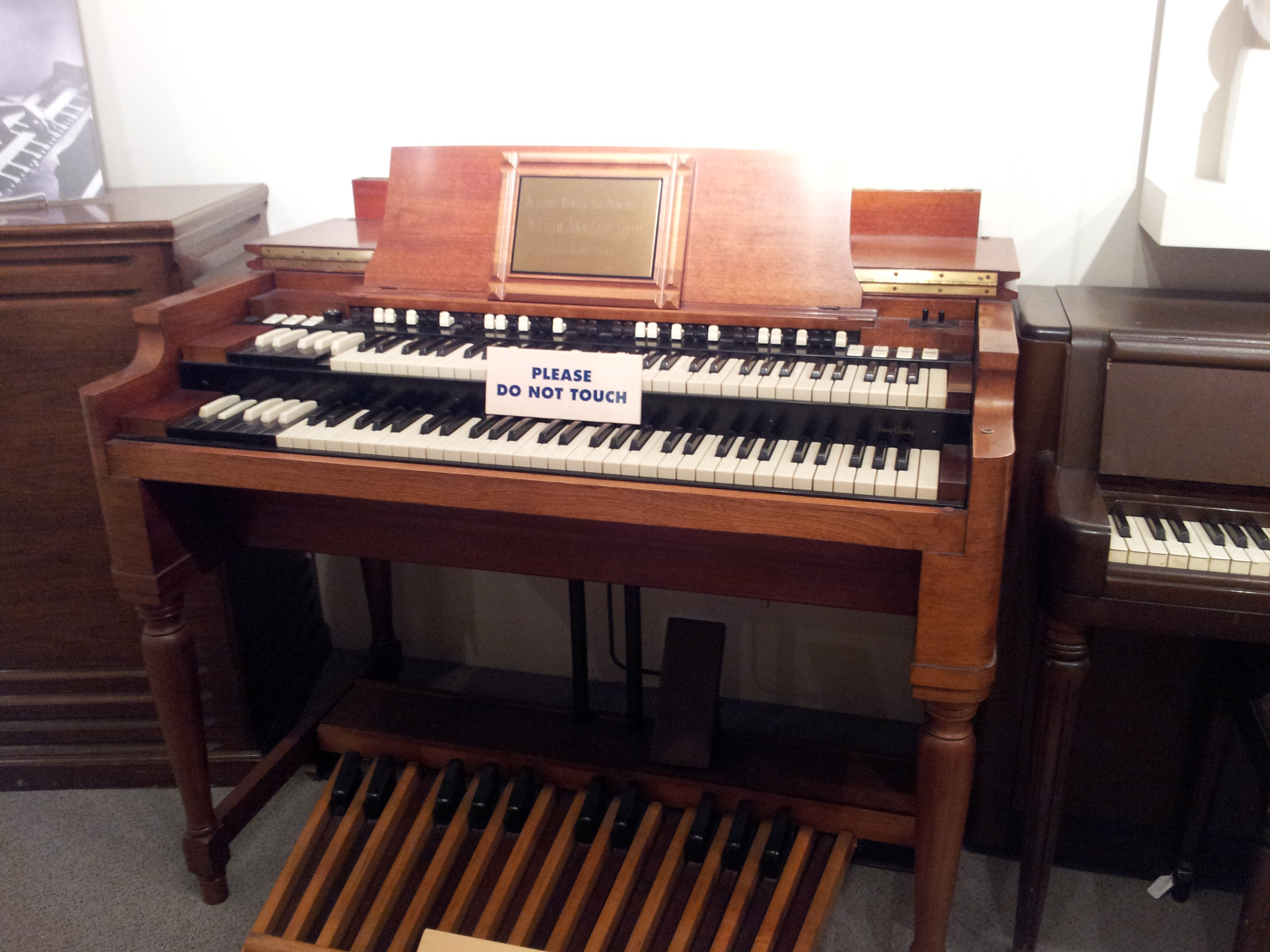
A Hammond organ similar to the one heard in "Good Vibrations"

At 2:13, the song shifts to sustained electric organ chords in F, with a maraca shaking on each beat, recalling the organ and percussion featured prominently in the verses. Sound on Sound describes this cut as the track's "most savage edit" for its unexpected slowdown into a 23-bar "church organ" section. The writer explains, "most people would go straight into a big splash hook-line section. Brian Wilson decided to slow the track even further ... Most arrangers would steer clear of this kind of drop in pace, on the grounds that it would be chart suicide, but not Brian." Carl Wilson recalled their father's concern over the tempo shift: "He was worried about the bridge section. You know, the time change, 'They can't dance to it.'" Brian later credited Stephen Foster as "a big influence on me, especially the sound of ‘Gotta keep those lovin' good vibrations happenin' with her'". (Note: Al Jardine likened the chant to the African-American spiritual "Down by the Riverside", misidentified as a Foster composition.) The sequence concludes with a choral "ah" sustaining an E♭/F chord, followed by a brief general pause. This moment of silence creates tension, leading into the final section.

Following the break, the chorus returns for five measures, moving through a transpositional structure that starts in B♭, shifts to A♭, and concludes with a brief measure in G♭. This descending progression contrasts with the previous ascending refrains. A short, three-part vocal counterpoint, referenced by Lambert as a fugato, overlays the refrain's upward transposition before settling in A♭, the song's final key. This section of the song shares melodic elements with Wilson's "Look", written in the same period, specifically in the march-like pattern and descending line (mostly in whole steps for "Good Vibrations", compressed into half steps in "Look"). Wilson recalled, "As soon as we got to [singing] that [ending choir] part I said, 'This is a masterpiece record.'" By the song's end, all seven scale degrees of the opening E♭ minor tonic have been engaged while the key remains destabilized.

== Single release ==
=== Publicity and lead-up to release ===
Wilson's instinctive talents for mixing sounds could most nearly equate to those of the old painters whose special secret was in the blending of their oils. And what is most amazing about all outstanding creative artists is that they are using only those basic materials which are freely available to everyone else.

— Band publicist Derek Taylor writing in Hit Parader, October 5, 1966

Band publicist Derek Taylor, who had promoted Pet Sounds in the UK, played a key role in marketing "Good Vibrations". He coined the term "pocket symphony", which Wilson felt "encapsulated the record perfectly". A Billboard ad on July 2, 1966, thanking the industry for Pet Sounds' sales, included an early reference to the single: "We're moved over the fact that our Pet Sounds brought on nothing but Good Vibrations." That summer, Wilson told journalist Tom Nolan: "Our new single, Good Vibrations, is gonna be a monster. ... Of course, it's still sticking pretty close to that same boy-girl thing, you know, but with a difference. And it's a start. It's definitely a start."

On August 26, Brian and Carl Wilson met Paul McCartney and George Harrison at Taylor's home, where Brian played an acetate of the song. Taylor recalled that McCartney was impressed and requested a copy, but Wilson declined, saying he was still unhappy with the mix. After the record's completion, Wilson and his assistant Michael Vosse appeared on a local TV show, possibly It's Boss with Sam Riddle or Lloyd Thaxton's dance program. Wilson brought out a large basket of vegetables and spoke about the benefits of roughage, confusing the host. In Anderle's recollection, Wilson previewed the record while eating carrots, embracing his "vegetable thing" with Riddle. Wilson also appeared on KHJ-TV's Teen Rock and Roll Dance Program, introducing the song to the show's in-studio audience and presenting an exclusive preview of the completed record. Van Dyke Parks attended one of these programs, and later recalled that when the song slowed in tempo and the teenagers paused their dancing, a nearby A&R executive remarked, "A promotion man's nightmare!"

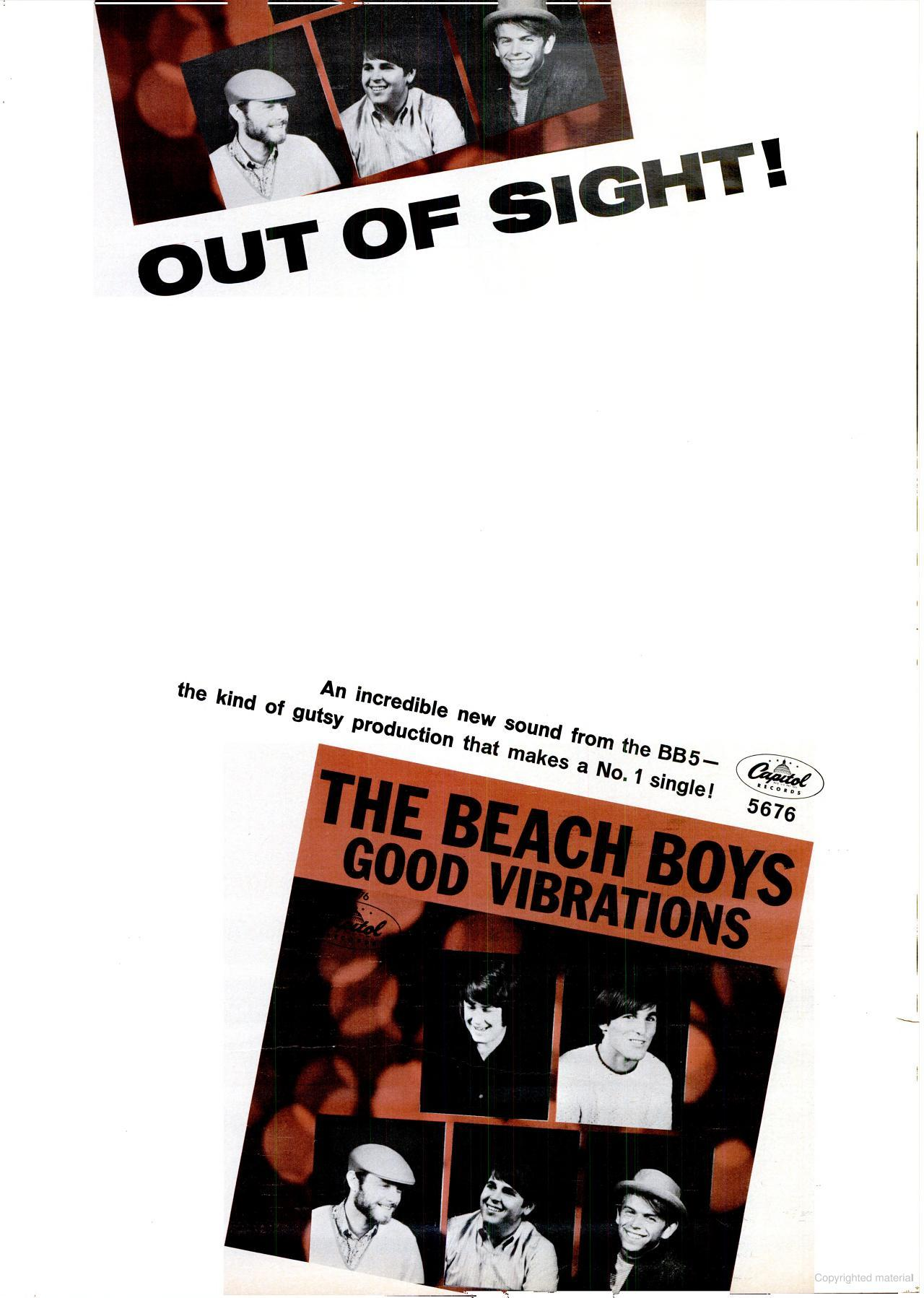
Advertisement for "Good Vibrations" published in Billboard magazine in October 1966

The "Good Vibrations" single, backed with the Pet Sounds instrumental "Let's Go Away for Awhile", was released in the U.S. on October 10, 1966. In Britain, it was issued on October 28 with "Wendy" from All Summer Long as the B-side. Shortly afterward, Wilson told a reporter, "I'm most proud of "Good Vibrations". It exemplifies a whole era. It's a whole, involved piece of music that says something."

=== First live performances ===
On October 21, 1966, eleven days after its release, the Beach Boys performed "Good Vibrations" live for the first time at the Michigan State University in East Lansing. The next day, the band performed two shows at the University of Michigan in Ann Arbor. Wilson supervised rehearsals and attended both shows as an audience member. At the second performance, he joined the band onstage for the encore, "Johnny B. Goode", earning a standing ovation. Returning to Los Angeles, he instructed his wife to gather as many friends as possible for an impromptu photoshoot at LAX. The resulting images became notable among fans for their perceived symbolic significance.

Without Wilson, the group embarked on a three-week European tour, marking their first performances in the United Kingdom. On October 26, they mimed "Good Vibrations" for the French television program Tilt Magazine, which aired in January—their only European TV appearance during the tour. Reviewing their late October concert in Paris, Melody Maker's Mike Hennesy wrote that the Beach Boys had struggled to replicate their studio sound live, and that "Good Vibrations" sounded "a little thin" compared to the record. Concerned about their performance quality, the group canceled scheduled appearances on Ready Steady Go! and Top of the Pops in November.

As "Good Vibrations" climbed the charts, the band's touring revenue neared $2 million annually (equivalent to $19.8 million in 2025). Capitol promoted the song with a two-page magazine ad declaring, "'Good Vibrations'—No. 1 in the USA, No. 1 in England." On November 6, the Beach Boys played their first UK concerts at the Finsbury Park Astoria in London, with attendees including Brian Epstein, Spencer Davis, John Walker, the Shadows, and Cathy McGowan. Ray Coleman of Disc & Music Echo wrote that "Good Vibrations" was less successful live than their other songs, adding, "nobody expected them to sound as good 'live' as on record. And this was where they fell down. Their stage act was nil."

=== Promotional films ===
Four promotional films were produced for "Good Vibrations". The first, filmed on October 23, 1966, depicts the band asleep at a fire station before sliding down poles and chasing a moving firetruck through Los Angeles. It aired on Top of the Pops on November 24. The second, showing the group recording in the studio, aired on the French news program Cinq Colonnes à La Une in February 1967.

The third and fourth films were edited from footage originally shot for Peter Whitehead's documentary The Beach Boys in London. Both feature candid moments from the band's November UK tour. A shorter edit aired on Top of the Pops on November 10 and Beat Club in Germany on December 31. The extended version includes scenes of Al Jardine and Dennis Wilson visiting Portobello Road, the band traveling to an EMI press conference on November 7, and clips from their November 14 concert at the Hammersmith Odeon. This version aired on Top of the Pops on November 17.

== Commercial performance ==
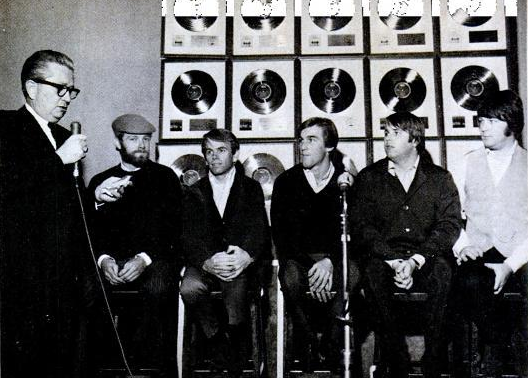
The Beach Boys (with Voyle Gilmore on far left) accepting a gold record certification for "Good Vibrations" at the Capitol Tower (December 1966)

"Good Vibrations" sold over 293,000 copies within its first four days. It debuted at number 62 on Cash Box (October 22) and number 38 on the Billboard Hot 100 (October 28). By late November, it had become the Beach Boys' first million-selling single and topped the UK charts for two weeks. On December 3, it was certified silver by the BPI. The single also peaked at number 1 in France, number 2 in Canada and Australia, and number 4 in Germany.

On December 10, 1966, "Good Vibrations" reached number 1 on the Billboard Hot 100, replacing the New Vaudeville Band's "Winchester Cathedral" and becoming the Beach Boys' third U.S. number-one hit after "I Get Around" and "Help Me, Rhonda". It was their first single to top both the U.S. and UK charts. In 2026, it was certified triple Platinum by the RIAA. (Note: In 2016, the digital single was certified platinum by the RIAA.) The song spent seven weeks in the top ten (two at number one) before being displaced by the Monkees' "I'm a Believer". With over two million copies sold, it began dropping from the charts in January 1967.

In June 1976, Capitol reissued "Good Vibrations" with "Wouldn't It Be Nice" as the B-side, peaking at number 18. As of 1997, it remained the Beach Boys' best-selling UK single. It was also Wilson's last composition to reach the U.S. top 10. (Note: Wilson produced the Beach Boys' 1976 version of "Rock and Roll Music", which became a top 10 hit, though he did not write the song.)

== Initial reactions ==
Music journalist Peter Doggett described "Good Vibrations" as "universally" hailed upon its release as the most adventurous pop recording yet. Conversely, biographer Steven Gaines suggested that U.S. reactions were mixed. The record elicited few detractors, one being San Francisco jazz critic Ralph J. Gleason. (Note: Gleason, who had recently shifted his focus to writing about Bob Dylan, dismissed the Beach Boys as "LA hype" before adding, "I think I liked them better before, if only for sociological reasons".) According to David Leaf, some radio programmers initially hesitated to play the song, considering it "too long and too progressive". Bruce Morrow, a prominent disc jockey in New York, reportedly disliked it. Mike Love said that Morrow "hated" the record "because it was so different. He wanted to hear 'I Get Around' or 'Surfin' U.S.A.' one more time, or 'California Girls Part Two'." White noted skepticism among some Los Angeles disc jockeys, though they "immediately made it the Pick Hit of the Week".

On October 15, 1966, five days after the single's U.S. release, Billboard predicted a top 20 placement, calling it "a sure-fire hit" with an "off-beat and intriguing rhythm". Cash Box praised its "catchy, easy-driving" sound, Record World described it as "highly imaginative", and Teen Set deemed it "the most fantastic pop single to date". Ahead of the band's November 18 concert in Indianapolis, Variety reported that the song was the most popular among local high school students. Jon Stebbins, then a teenager, initially mistook the song for a new psychedelic band, later realizing it was the Beach Boys and concluding, "Man, those guys have really freaked out." James B. Murphy, author of the 2015 biography Becoming the Beach Boys, recalled listening to the record with his older brother as a ten-year-old in The Bronx: "We didn't speak [as we listened together]. It was like a sacred experience. ... We must have played ‘Good Vibrations' fifty times in a row."

Among the early rock journalists in America, Crawdaddy! founder Paul Williams raved in his magazine, "No matter what you've heard, all the BEACH BOYS sing on 'GV'; the instrumental work, however is done by studio musicians. Some of the stranger sounds are from a theremin [sic]; now Brian wants a cathedral organ for the next album." In Britain, reviews were overwhelmingly positive. New Musical Express (NME) called the record "technically brilliant" and "impeccably performed", while The Sunday Express proclaimed, "They've Found the New Sound at Last!" Melody Maker also gave it a favorable review.

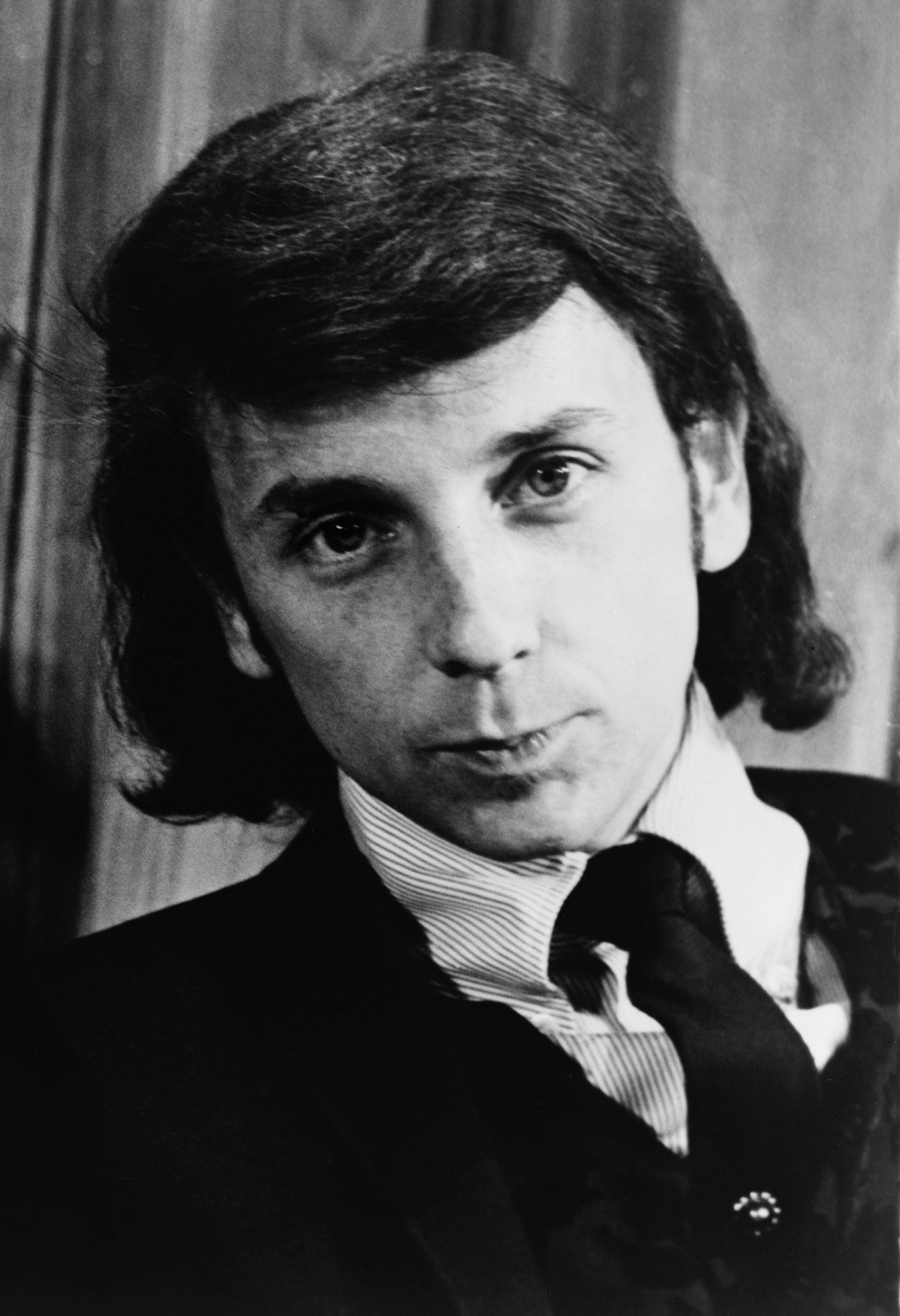
Phil Spector (pictured in 1965) later compared "Good Vibrations" unfavorably to Alfred Hitchcock's work, explaining that the record, like Psycho, was a "great" production that lacked the emotional depth of a narrative such as Rebecca.

Some contemporaries offered tempered praise. The Who frontman Pete Townshend feared that the single would lead to a trend of overproduction, telling a Disc & Music Echo reporter, "'Good Vibrations' was probably a good record but who's to know? You had to play it about 90 bloody times to even hear what they were singing about." Record producer and singer Jonathan King called it "computerized pop" and opined, "With justification, comments are being passed that 'Good Vibrations' is an inhuman work of art ... impressive, fantastic, commercial—yes. Emotional, soul-destroying, shattering—no." Asked about "Good Vibrations" in a 1990 interview, Paul McCartney said it was "a great record" before adding, "it didn't quite have the emotional thing that Pet Sounds had for me".

In 1967, one month after Jann Wenner had launched Rolling Stone magazine, he praised "Good Vibrations" as "an honest-to-God monster" and "a song you can bathe in". That year, Cheetah contributor Jules Siegel wrote that the song had "marked the beginning of a new era in pop music", however, among the majority of American music critics, "everybody agreed that Brian Wilson and the Beach Boys were still too square. It would take more than 'Good Vibrations' and Pet Sounds to erase three and a half years of 'Little Deuce Coupe'". (Note: Music journalist Noel Murray argued that the song tempered the initially mixed reception of Pet Sounds in the U.S., where some longtime fans were confused by the album's "un-hip orchestrations and pervasive sadness".)

=== Year-end polls and accolades ===
In December 1966, "Good Vibrations" was voted the best single of the year by readers of Disc & Music Echo and Valentine. The Beach Boys also topped the NME readers' poll as the world's number one band, ahead of the Beatles, the Walker Brothers, the Rolling Stones, and the Four Tops. Billboard said that the NME's result was probably influenced by the success of "Good Vibrations" when the votes were cast, together with the band's recent tour, whereas the Beatles had neither a recent single nor had they toured the UK throughout 1966; the reporter added that "The sensational success of the Beach Boys, however, is being taken as a portent that the popularity of the top British groups of the last three years is past its peak." (Note: Heylin concurred, "the FabFour's lowly position reflected not any great descent in popularity, but rather in output", as the Beatles had released only two singles in 1966. In Record Mirror, the Beach Boys were ranked the "Best-Selling Artist" of 1966. The same list ranked the Beatles at number nine, behind Ken Dodd, Cliff Richard, and Dave Dee, Dozy, Beaky, Mick & Tich.) The Beach Boys were also voted the top vocal group in polls across Russia, Western Europe, Japan, and the Philippines. In Denmark, Brian Wilson became the first American to win "Best Foreign-Produced Recording" in a national newspaper poll.

At the 9th Annual Grammy Awards, "Good Vibrations" was nominated in four categories: Best Performance by a Vocal Group, Best Contemporary (R&R) Group Performance, Vocal or Instrumental, Best Contemporary (R&R) Recording, and Best Arrangement Accompanying a Vocalist(s) or Instrumentalist(s). It lost Best Rock Song to "Winchester Cathedral", despite the latter not being a rock song. (Note: The same ceremony overlooked Pet Sounds entirely.)

== Planned follow-ups and collapse of Smile ==
As 1966 whirled to a close, it seemed as if Brian had realized his most audacious visions. ... It was everything he'd ever wanted—commercial popularity, unbelievable artistic freedom, unimaginable acclaim from his peers. All the rules were gone now, all the expectations shaken into dust. Able to finally transcend pop's norms and his own limitations, anything could happen. Anything, it seemed, except what did.

— Biographer Peter Ames Carlin

Following "Good Vibrations", Wilson faced a personal and professional decline. (Note: Badman cited the completion of "Good Vibrations" as "the start of his undoing", while Gaines wrote that "it was all downhill" afterward.) For a limited period, Capitol granted him the latitude to work with few constraints, an allowance he used to pursue an increasingly avant-garde direction. He planned to apply his modular recording techniques to an entire album, Smile, which was to include "Good Vibrations". (Note: Tobler writes that the track would have served as "the air portion" of "The Elements". A 2004 Sound on Sound article reported that Wilson had "apparently" intended in 1966 to close the album with "Good Vibrations".) The company designed the LP sleeve with "Good Vibrations" inscribed three times on the front cover and their advance advertisements promised "other new and fantastic Beach Boys songs" consistent with its sound. Harrison writes that he had felt compelled to outdo himself and, given the scope of his ambitions, "an extremely dangerous phase" was inevitable to follow. (Note: In Heylin's description, "Wilson no longer knew when to stop, the success of 'Good Vibrations' having turned any largesse from the label into a license to never let go.")

From late 1966 through mid-1967, Wilson planned "Heroes and Villains" and "Vegetables" as potential follow-up singles to surpass "Good Vibrations". However, delays stretched to eight months due to Wilson's indecision and other issues. (Note: In one incident, Wilson cancelled a Smile recording session due to bad "vibrations" he had felt emanating from the studio, incurring a $3,000 expense (equivalent to $30,000 in 2025). Murry Wilson told a reporter in late 1967 that Brian had "lost a lot of confidence" after "Good Vibrations", fearing he could never write anything better. According to Michael Vosse, Murry thought that it had been "a horrible mistake" to release "Good Vibrations" because it would have caused Brian "to lose his whole audience". Anderle's account differed, saying that Brian saw "Good Vibrations" as a beginning rather than a peak.) Some Smile sessions included improvisational comedy sketch recordings, including one premise involving Wilson's colleagues ordering from a psychedelic ice cream truck playing a "Good Vibrations" jingle, simulated by Wilson on piano.

Ultimately, "Heroes and Villains" was released in July 1967 and failed to match "Good Vibrations" in critical and commercial success. Smile remained unfinished, and in September, the Beach Boys released Smiley Smile, which included "Good Vibrations" at Capitol's insistence. Wilson opposed its inclusion but was outvoted by his bandmates for the first time. Anderle explained, "[S]omething [Brian] never wanted to do is put a single onto the album, but he was forced to do that. For sales. That was another, I'm sure, a minor tragedy for him." The Beach Boys would not enjoy another number-one hit until 1988's "Kokomo", created without Wilson's involvement.

== Cultural impact ==
=== 1960s counterculture ===
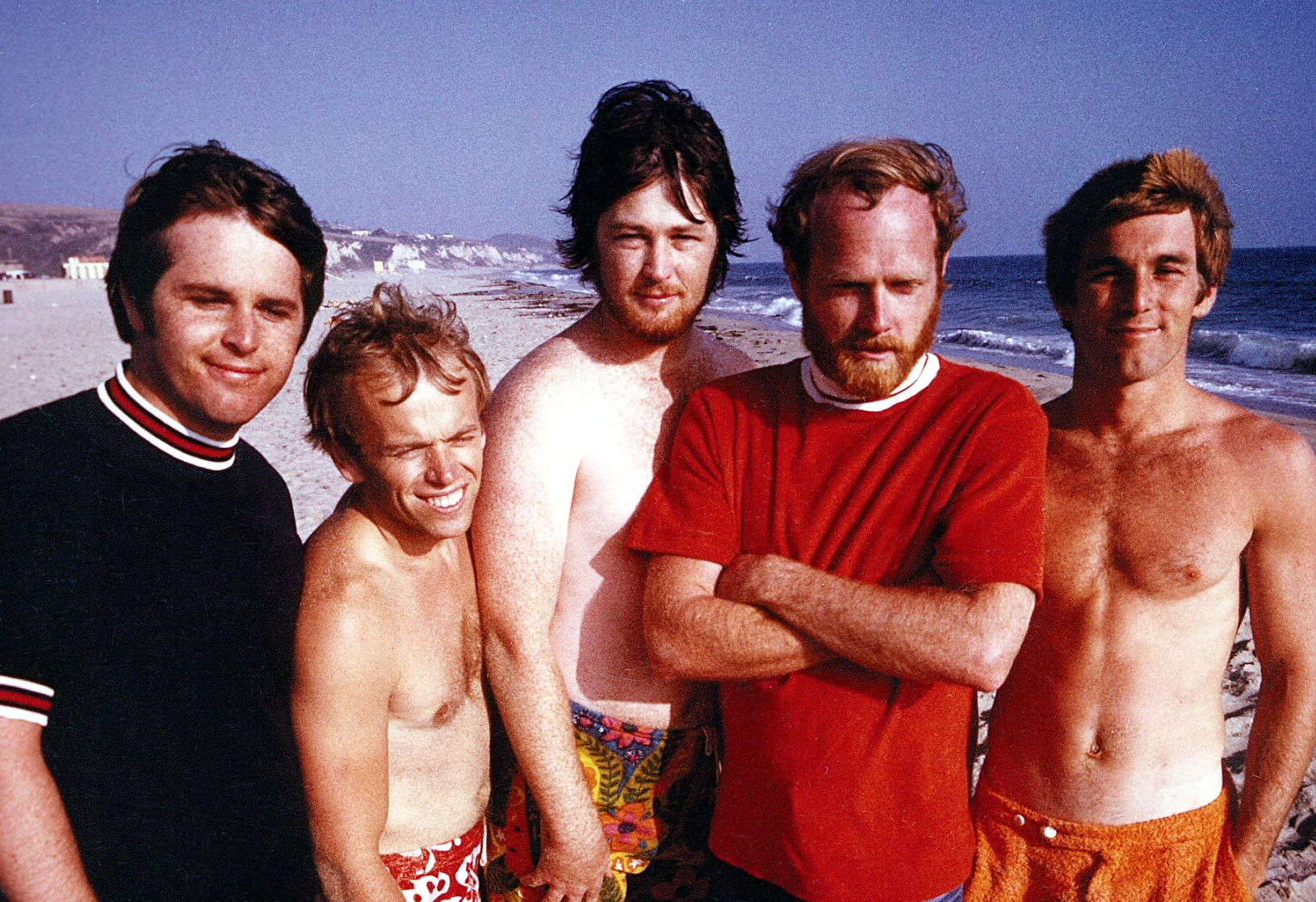
The Beach Boys at Zuma Beach in July 1967

"Good Vibrations" had an immediate and lasting impact on popular culture. The song became closely associated with the youth culture and its surrounding movements of the era, anticipating the Summer of Love and the flower child movement by several months. (Note: Stebbins said that it "vaulted nearly every other rock act in their delivery of a Flower Power classic".) It also popularized the slang term "vibes" in the context of intuitive feelings or atmosphere. (Note: Prior, the term had usually referred to vibraphones in mainstream usage.)

Jon Savage, in his book 1966: The Year the Decade Exploded (2015), wrote that the single's international success briefly positioned Los Angeles as "the centre of pop", superseding London, until the city's cultural prominence was itself challenged by San Francisco's music scene. Carlin wrote that while the Beach Boys had found themselves "near the leading edge" of the youth movement, most critics were ultimately hesitant to place them in the same artistic realm as figures such as Bob Dylan, viewing them as "candy-striped tools of consumerism." Leaf writes that while the song had encapsulated the "almost-acid generation", the title phrase "soon became a cliched byword."

=== Record production and popular music ===
"Good Vibrations" revolutionized pop music production, especially for singles, and Wilson's unorthodox recording methods soon became standard practice. Alongside the Beatles' Revolver, "Good Vibrations" was a prime proponent in shifting rock music from live performances to studio creations that could not be recreated in a natural acoustic setting. Musicologist Marshall Heiser explains that it had set a precedent by challenging listeners to accept the recording as its own unique sonic reality. Similarly, musicologist Charlie Gillett called it "one of the first records to flaunt studio production as a quality in its own right, rather than as a means of presenting a performance". Mark Brend, in Strange Sounds: Offbeat Instruments and Sonic Experiments in Pop (2005), writes:

Other artists and producers, notably the Beatles and Phil Spector, had used varied instrumentation and multi-tracking to create complex studio productions before. And others, like Roy Orbison, had written complicated pop songs before. But "Good Vibrations" eclipsed all that came before it, in both its complexity as a production and the liberties it took with conventional notions of how to structure a pop song. Crammed into its three and a half minutes are previously untried mixes of instruments, unexpected jumps from one section to another, and of course, unparalleled harmony pop vocals. Yet in all of this, the real triumph of the recording is that it fits together as a catchy, hummable, radio-friendly pop song.

The 2004 book Analog Days: The Invention and Impact of the Moog Synthesizer describes it as "one of the most influential pop singles of all time", while Rikky Rooksby's Inside Classic Rock Tracks (2001) calls it "a landmark in the development of popular music" particularly for its "unpredictable transitions and exotic instrumentation". Larry Starr, in his 2006 book American Popular Music: From Minstrelsy to MP3, argues it "may well be the most thoroughly innovative single" of the 1960s and marked "an important milestone" in music production. Starr elaborates, "Virtually every aspect of the record is unusual, from the vocal arrangement to the instrumentation, from the chordal vocabulary to the overall form." (Note: Peter Ames Carlin adds that its shifts in rhythm and mood "exploded even the most progressive notions of how a pop song could be written, constructed, and performed". Carlin compared its impact to Bob Dylan's "Like a Rolling Stone" (1966), stating that while Dylan's lyrics were wild and psychedelic, transforming cultural expression, Wilson's equally adventurous and psychedelic music had presented "a vision of the future".)

"Good Vibrations" may yet prove to be the most significantly revolutionary piece of the current rock renaissance ... everyone has felt its import to some degree, in such disparate things as the Yellow Balloon's "Yellow Balloon" and the Beatles' "A Day in the Life," in groups as far apart as (recent) Grateful Dead and the Association, as Van Dyke Parks and the Who.

— Jazz & Pop editor Gene Sculatti, September 1968

According to White, "every producer in town was talking about the 45" upon its release due to its multi-part structure and novel production. Among the musicians who felt its influence was Blood, Sweat and Tears founder Al Kooper, who said, "I stole millions of things from that song. It just changed my whole outlook of what you could do." Singer-songwriter Jimmy Webb credited "Good Vibrations" with redefining the scope of the three-minute record, proving that songs could seamlessly incorporate shifts in tempo, instrumentation, and vocal arrangements. Ambient musician Max Eastley described it as a revelatory experience that ended his folk career, likening its impact to being struck by lightning. The Mamas and the Papas, who were among the many musicians who moved to California partly due to the Beach Boys' romanticized portrayal of the region, referenced "Good Vibrations" in their autobiographical 1967 single "Creeque Alley".

Many musicians and groups created songs that attempted to match "Good Vibrations" in the late 1960s. Gene Sculatti declared in 1968 that it was the "ultimate in-studio production trip" and "a primary influential piece for all producing rock artists". Mark Prendergast, author of The Ambient Century: From Mahler to Moby (2003), acknowledges that the single had "changed the course of rock and popular music" and earned Wilson the reputation of being "one of the great sound-shapers of the century, influencing The Beatles and the whole production of rock and pop from then on." (Note: David Leaf contends that "Good Vibrations" established Wilson as the leading composer-producer of his time, surpassing Phil Spector. Similarly, Jon Stebbins writes that despite the obvious talent of other innovative artists of the mid-1960s, such as the Beatles and Spector, "no single influence was stronger than Brian Wilson", whose work "goaded virtually everyone else in the business, including the Beatles, to strive for a higher level of artistic achievement.") Further to the single's impact on the Beach Boys' rivals, Beatles biographer Clinton Heylin suggests that the band's 1967 double A-sided single "Strawberry Fields Forever" / "Penny Lane" was a direct response to "Good Vibrations". (Note: Paul Williams concurred that Wilson's production of "Good Vibrations" provided "the dominant inspiration and goad that drove the Beatles to create some of their most ambitious works.")

"Good Vibrations" positioned the Beach Boys as one of the few bands besides the Beatles to achieve mainstream success with a psychedelic rock song in 1966, when the genre was still emerging. (Note: Atlantic Records executive Phillip Rauls recalled that "Good Vibrations" was his first exposure to what he called "acid rock" and credited its theremin sound with inspiring other musicians to experiment with psychedelia in the studio.) It contributed significantly to the development of the progressive rock and progressive pop genres, and effectively launched the latter style. PopMatters contributor Scott Interrante decreed that the single's impact on psychedelic and progressive rock "can't be overstated". Bill Martin, author of books about progressive rock, suggested that the Beach Boys had cleared a pathway toward the genre, writing, "The fact is, the same reasons why much progressive rock is difficult to dance to apply just as much to 'Good Vibrations' and 'A Day in the Life.'" John Covach, in his book What's That Sound? An Introduction to Rock and Its History (2006), writes that "Good Vibrations", together with the Beatles' "Strawberry Fields Forever" and Sgt. Pepper's Lonely Hearts Club Band (1967), demonstrated that rock could be viewed as serious art. (Note: Leaf described the single's release as solidifying the Beach Boys' status as "leaders of a new type of pop music, Art Rock.")

Author and Saint Etienne founder Bob Stanley said it was "modern pop's first multi-movement single", an influence, Rowland felt, was apparent on "A Day in the Life", McCartney's "Band on the Run" (1973), and Queen's "Bohemian Rhapsody" (1975). Priore wrote that the song anticipated the multi-textured soul music exemplified by the 1971 releases What's Going On by Marvin Gaye and "Theme from Shaft" by Isaac Hayes, both of which he identified as among "the most historically important R&B music ever pressed." Musician David Gilmour has stated he was attempting to imitate the "chopping cellos" from "Good Vibrations" on his guitar playing at the beginning of the Pink Floyd track "Run Like Hell".

=== Theremins and synthesizers ===
Paul Tanner with the Electro-Theremin

"Good Vibrations" revived interest in theremins and increased awareness of analog synthesizers. Although it does not contain a theremin, it is the most frequently cited example of the instrument in pop music. By the 2000s, this misconception had been widely repeated in books, CD liner notes, and by those involved in its recording. Unlike the theremin, the Electro-Theremin is controlled with a slide rather than by hand movements in the air. To replicate the recording in concert, Wilson first asked Paul Tanner to perform with the Beach Boys, but Tanner declined due to other commitments. The band then approached Walter Sear, who worked with Robert Moog to develop a ribbon controller that mimicked a guitar fretboard. Moog subsequently mass-produced theremins, and demand from pop music fans quickly depleted his inventory.

Authors Trevor Pinch and Frank Trocco credited "Good Vibrations" with cementing the use of "far-out, electronic sounds" in mainstream rock music, and Tobler surmised that the song's interwoven association with the theremin may have later deterred other rock musicians from using the instrument. In Steven M. Martin's 1993 documentary Theremin: An Electronic Odyssey, in which Wilson makes an appearance, it was reported that the attention being paid to the theremin due to "Good Vibrations" prompted Russian authorities to exile its inventor, Leon Theremin.

== Live performances, remakes, and alternate releases ==
"Good Vibrations" was frequently performed live by the band, with the arrangement simplified due to practical constraints on instruments and voices. The organ-based midsection was repeatedly lengthened and embellished in concert and rehearsal recordings, adding extra vocal lines and an audience sing-along feel. They stretched the singalong section from six to seven phrases by mid-1967, and to ten phrases by the early 1970s. On November 26, 1976, Wilson appeared as the musical guest on NBC's Saturday Night (later Saturday Night Live) and performed "Good Vibrations" alone on a piano set in a giant sandbox. (Note: Off-screen, his psychologist, Eugene Landy, held cue cards reading "RELAX" and "SMILE". White characterized the performance as "less a performance than a pointedly exploitative skit about a singer suffering from clinical stage fright", calling it "live television at its most distressing" and part of a series of ill-conceived media events orchestrated by Landy.)

Additional alternate mixes and live performances of the song have been released across several of the band's albums. The 1973 live album The Beach Boys in Concert featured a performance from November 1972. The 1983 compilation Rarities included an alternate mix from 1966. The 1993 box set Good Vibrations: Thirty Years of the Beach Boys contained a recording of the band's second public performance of the song alongside several outtakes from the original studio sessions. The song was also the opening track in the box set's attempt to approximate a completed version of Smile. The 1998 compilation Endless Harmony included a rehearsal take from the band's December 8, 1968, concert at the Astoria Theatre in London. A version from the scrapped 1967 live album Lei'd in Hawaii appeared on the 2003 compilation Hawthorne, CA.

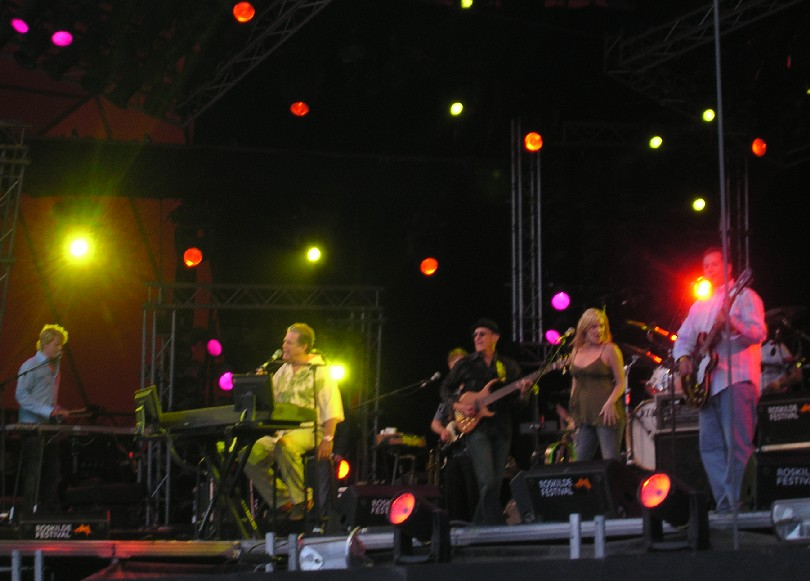
Wilson leading a 2005 performance of Brian Wilson Presents Smile, which included "Good Vibrations" as its closing song.

As a solo artist, Wilson rerecorded "Good Vibrations" as the closing track on his 2004 album Brian Wilson Presents Smile. This extended version included lyrics by Tony Asher and a different bridge section, both originally written in 1966. Asher was initially uncredited for his contributions. According to Carlin, using a different lyric set publicly slighted Mike Love and led to a dispute between Wilson's wife and manager, Melinda, and Asher, who had never signed a publishing contract for his share of the song. Asher's credit was later restored.

To commemorate its 40th anniversary, the Good Vibrations: 40th Anniversary Edition EP was released. It contained "Good Vibrations", four alternate versions, and a stereo mix of "Let's Go Away for Awhile". The artwork replicated the original single sleeve. In 2016, the EP was reissued as a 12" record for the song's 50th anniversary.

The eight-track master tape of "Good Vibrations" has remained lost since the 1980s, preventing the creation of a true stereo mix. The first official stereo mix, created with approval from Brian Wilson and Mark Linett, was included in the 2012 reissue of Smiley Smile. It used digital technology developed by Derry Fitzgerald to extract individual instrumental and vocal elements from the mono master.

== Use in media ==
"Good Vibrations" became widely used in commercial jingles, television and film. Stebbins opined that the "duplicated, cloned, commercialized, and re-fabricated" usages of the song had the ultimate effect of "completely diluting the genius of the original".

In 1978, Sunkist licensed the song for a U.S. advertising campaign promoting its orange soda. Badman stated that since Murry had sold their publishing rights in 1969, they had no control over how "Good Vibrations" was used in advertisements. In his 2016 memoir, Good Vibrations: My Life as a Beach Boy, Love wrote that the band had "an agreement with Sunkist Orange Soda, in which the company paid us $1.5 million to use 'Good Vibrations' in its commercials and to put the phrase on its packaging and in-store displays." By 1980, the campaign had made Sunkist the best-selling orange soda in the U.S. Love enjoyed the campaign but disliked the product, reportedly telling a Sunkist executive, "If I was driving my Range Rover through the Mojave Desert, and it broke down, I would first drain my radiator fluid and drink that before I had a Sunkist."

The lyric "I'm picking up good vibrations" is quoted in Cyndi Lauper's 1984 single "She Bop". In 1996, experimental rock group His Name Is Alive released an homage titled "Universal Frequencies" on their album Stars on E.S.P.; frontman Warren Defever reportedly listened to "Good Vibrations" repeatedly for a week before deciding that the song "needed a sequel". In 2001, the song was used prominently in a scene with Tom Cruise, Tilda Swinton, and Kurt Russell in the psychological thriller Vanilla Sky. A live version of the song, from the album Live in London, appears as a playable track in the 2010 video game Rock Band 3. In 2019, the song was used prominently in a scene for Jordan Peele's psychological horror thriller film Us.

== Cover versions ==
Despite its popularity, relatively few artists have covered "Good Vibrations" due to the intricacies of its arrangement. Versions of the song range from faithful recreations to reimaginings in the style of punk, synth-pop, electronic, jazz, hip-hop, doo-wop, Latin, orchestral, bluegrass, and country. Artists who have covered the song include Groove Holmes, the Troggs, Charlie McCoy, Psychic TV, the Cowsills, Kenny Rogers and the First Edition, the Shadows, the King's Singers, Nina Hagen, Aika Ohno, the Chambers Brothers, and the Langley Schools Music Project.

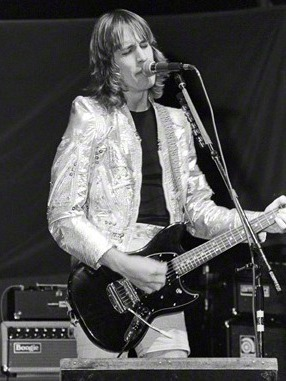
"Good Vibrations" returned to the top 40 charts with Todd Rundgren's version in 1976

In 1976, Todd Rundgren recorded a nearly identical cover version for his album Faithful. Released as a single, it peaked at number 34 on the Billboard Hot 100. Wilson praised Rundgren's version, stating, "Oh, he did a marvelous job, he did a great job. I was very proud of his version." Rundgren explained that while he had always appreciated the Beach Boys' sound, he became especially interested with Pet Sounds and "Good Vibrations". He aimed to replicate the record as accurately as possible, "because in the intervening 10 years, radio had changed so much. Radio had become so formatted and so structured that that whole experience was already gone."

In 2012, Wilson Phillips, a trio featuring Wilson's daughters Carnie and Wendy along with John Phillips' daughter Chynna, released an album of Beach Boys and the Mamas & the Papas covers titled Dedicated. Their version of "Good Vibrations", with Carnie on lead vocals, was released as a single and reached number 25 on Billboard's A/C chart.

== Retrospective assessments and legacy ==
Regularly featured on "greatest-of-all-time" critics' rankings, "Good Vibrations" is widely recognized as one of the most important compositions and recordings of the rock era. It is commonly regarded as one of rock's greatest "masterpieces" and among the finest pop records in history, as well as Brian Wilson's magnum opus. In 1997, a panel of artists, producers, and music industry figures, surveyed by Mojo magazine, voted it the greatest single of all time.

Walter Everett, author of The Foundations of Rock (2008), decreed that Wilson is "rightly praised" for his "monumental" achievements with "Good Vibrations". In Waiting for the Sun: A Rock 'n' Roll History of Los Angeles (2009), Barney Hoskyns described it as the city's ultimate 1960s psychedelic pop record, pushing pop production to its limits while remaining accessible. In Understanding Rock (1997), Daniel Harrison stated that it represented the "most successful" convergence of the Beach Boys' commercial appeal with Wilson's artistic ambitions. The Pleasure of Modernist Music (2004) stated that it was Wilson's first and "unquestionably most brilliantly successful" work under heavy drug influence. (Note: Timothy White described "Good Vibrations" as a synthesis of the mid-1960s psychedelic surge, noting its array of exotic instruments that rivaled Phil Spector's work. Stebbins regarded it as the band's greatest single and "a pure leap forward".)

At its best, the Beach Boys' music evokes a naiveté without falsity, giving shape and depth to a kind of American disposition—enterprise unencumbered by skepticism—and grants it a kind of dignity in the process. It's the last part that seems to confound a lot of people. But I can hear it in "Good Vibrations" as much as in "Surfin' USA."

— Musician and writer Luis Sanchez

Creem editor Ben Edmonds viewed the song as proof that "fun could be art". On the single's fiftieth anniversary, Billboard contributor Andrew Unterberger praised "Good Vibrations" for its pervasive brilliance, "essentially unprecedented for a Top 40 hit at the time", and compared it favorably to "the Fallingwater of pop music", though he felt that its perceived lack of emotional depth, in contrast to the "proto-emo anthems" of Pet Sounds, kept some rock fans at a distance. He concluded, "That's kind of the point, though: "Good Vibrations" finds its power through communicating love's elemental inarticulateness." (Note: Sanchez similarly argued that the record embodied an impulse toward pleasure and accessibility, rendering "whatever countercultural requirements rock history could foist into it look like the inanities they are.") In his 2014 33⅓ book on Smile, Luis Sanchez observed that its massive success propelled the Beach Boys "into an ambit of pop beyond any obvious explanation of how such an event should have happened."

Among the band members, Jardine remarked, "Brian was absolutely at his peak back then. God, he was just like a freight train. We were hanging on for dear life." Brian, in a 1970 interview, indicated that "Good Vibrations" had remained his favorite song in their catalogue, solely for its use of cello.

In June 2026, CBS News included the song in its list of the 250 essential American songs of the past 250 years.

== Personnel ==
The details in this section are adapted from The Smile Sessions liner notes, which includes a sessionography compiled by band archivist Craig Slowinski, and the website Bellagio 10452, maintained by music historian Andrew G. Doe.

=== Single edit ===
The Beach Boys

- Al Jardine – backing vocals
- Bruce Johnston – backing vocals
- Mike Love – lead and backing vocals
- Brian Wilson – lead and backing vocals, tack piano (choruses), overdubbed tambourine (choruses)
- Carl Wilson – lead and backing vocals, electric rhythm guitar (choruses and chorus fade), shaker (second bridge)
- Dennis Wilson – backing vocals, Hammond organ (second bridge)

Additional players

- Hal Blaine – drums (verses and choruses), timpani (choruses), shaker (second bridge)
- Jimmy Bond – upright bass (first bridge)
- Frank Capp – bongos with sticks
- Al Casey – electric rhythm guitar (verses and first bridge)
- Jerry Cole – electric rhythm guitar (first bridge)
- Gary Coleman – sleigh bells (third bridge and chorus fade)
- Steve Douglas – tenor flute (verses and first bridge)
- Jesse Ehrlich – cello
- Jim Gordon – drums (third bridge and chorus fade)
- Bill Green– contra-clarinet, bass saxophone
- Jim Horn – piccolo (first bridge)
- Larry Knechtel – Hammond organ (verses)
- Plas Johnson – piccolo (verses and chorus fade), flutes (chorus fade)
- Al De Lory – tack piano
- Mike Melvoin – upright piano (chorus fade)
- Jay Migliori – flutes (verses and chorus fade)
- Tommy Morgan – bass harmonica, overdubbed jaw harp, harmonica
- Bill Pitman – Danelectro bass (first bridge, third bridge, and chorus fade)
- Ray Pohlman – Fender bass (verses and first bridge)
- Don Randi – electric harpsichord
- Lyle Ritz – upright bass (verses and second bridge), Fender bass (choruses)
- Billy Strange – 12-string electric rhythm guitar (verses)
- Paul Tanner – Electro-Theremin
- Terry (surname unknown, possibly Terry Melcher) – tambourine (verses)
- Arthur Wright – Fender bass (third bridge and chorus fade)
- unknown (possibly Hal Blaine) – tambourine (first bridge)

Technical staff

- Chuck Britz – engineer
- Cal Harris – engineer
- Jim Lockert – engineer

=== Partial sessionography ===
- February 17 – Gold Star (this session produced the verses heard in the final master)
  - Hal Blaine – drums
  - Frank Capp – bongos with sticks (cups instead of bongos on some takes)
  - Al Casey – electric rhythm guitar
  - Steve Douglas – tenor flute
  - Bill Green – contra-clarinet
  - Larry Knechtel – Hammond organ
  - Plas Johnson – piccolo
  - Jay Migliori – flute (verses and first bridge)
  - Ray Pohlman – Fender bass (fuzz bass in chorus)
  - Don Randi – grand piano (piano with taped strings on earlier takes)
  - Lyle Ritz – upright bass
  - Billy Strange – 12-string electric rhythm guitar (lead on earlier takes)
  - Paul Tanner – Electro-Theremin
  - Terry (surname unknown, possibly Terry Melcher) – tambourine
  - Tony (surname unknown, possibly Tony Asher) – sleigh bells
- March 3 – Gold Star (discarded overdubs recorded on February 17 backing track)
  - Brian Wilson – vocals
  - Carl Wilson – vocals
  - unknown (possibly Carl Wilson) – Fender bass (choruses)
  - unknown (possibly Tony Asher) – jaw harp
- April 9 – Gold Star (discarded alternate version)
  - Hal Blaine – drums
  - Frank Capp – bongos with sticks
  - Steve Douglas – tenor flute
  - Carl Fortina – accordion
  - Bill Green – contra-clarinet
  - Carol Kaye – 12-string electric guitar
  - Larry Knechtel – Hammond organ
  - Al De Lory – piano with taped strings
  - Mike Melvoin – tack piano
  - Jay Migliori – flute
  - Tommy Morgan – bass harmonica
  - Ray Pohlman – Fender bass (fuzz bass in chorus)
  - Lyle Ritz – upright bass
  - Arthur C. Smith – piccolo, ocarina
  - Paul Tanner – Electro-Theremin
- May 4 – Western ["First Chorus", "Second Chorus", and "Fade"] (this session produced the first bridge heard in the final master)
  - Jimmy Bond – upright bass
  - Frank Capp – bongos with sticks, tambourine, overdubbed sleigh bells
  - Al Casey – electric guitar
  - Jerry Cole – electric guitar
  - Jim Gordon – overdubbed sleigh bells
  - Bill Green – bass saxophone
  - Jim Horn – piccolo
  - Al De Lory – tack pianos (including overdub)
  - Tommy Morgan – bass harmonica, overdubbed jaw harp
  - Ray Pohlman – Fender bass
  - Bill Pitman – Danelectro bass (with fuzz tone)
  - Paul Tanner – Electro-Theremin
  - unknown (possibly Hal Blaine) – tambourine
- May 24 – Sunset Sound ["Part 1", "Part 2", "Part 3", and "Part 4"] (discarded bridge and choruses)
  - Gary Coleman – castanets, sleigh bells, clavs
  - Steve Douglas – tambourine
  - Jim Gordon – drums, timpani
  - Bill Green – alto flute
  - Jim Horn – flute, piccolo (bridge)
  - Carol Kaye – Danelectro bass
  - Al De Lory – pianos with taped strings (including overdub)
  - Jay Migliori – flute (bridge), kazoos (including overdub)
  - Lyle Ritz – upright bass
  - Paul Tanner – Electro-Theremin
  - Carl Wilson – Fender bass
- May 25 – Sunset Sound ["Part 1", "Part 2", "Part 3", and "Part 4"] (discarded overdubs recorded on May 24 backing tracks)
  - Arthur "Skeets" Herfurt – clarinet
  - Jim Horn – piccolo
  - Abe Most – clarinet
- May 27 – Western ["Part C", "Chorus", and "Fade Sequence"] (this session produced the third bridge and chorus fade heard in the final master)
  - Gary Coleman – timpanis ("Part C"), sleigh bells ("Chorus")
  - Steve Douglas – tambourine
  - Jim Gordon – drums
  - Jim Horn – piccolos, flutes
  - Plas Johnson – piccolos, flutes
  - Mike Melvoin – upright piano, overdubbed piano with taped strings
  - Bill Pitman – Danelectro bass (including fuzz tone)
  - Emil Richards – overdubbed vibraphones
  - Lyle Ritz – upright bass (arco in "Part C")
  - Paul Tanner – Electro-Theremin
  - Carl Wilson – electric rhythm guitar (chorus fade)
  - Arthur Wright – Fender bass
- June 2 – Western ["Inspiration"] (this session produced the first, second and third choruses heard in the final master, as well as a discarded bridge)
  - Hal Blaine – drums, overdubbed tambourine (bridge), timpani, cups (bridge)
  - Bill Pitman – Danelectro bass (with fuzz tone)
  - Don Randi – electric harpsichord
  - Lyle Ritz – Fender bass
  - Brian Wilson – tack piano (choruses), overdubbed tambourine (choruses)
  - Carl Wilson – electric rhythm guitar
- June 12 – Western ["Inspiration"] (overdubs recorded on June 2 backing tracks)
  - Hal Blaine – tambourine (bridge)
  - Jesse Ehrlich – cello (choruses)
  - Paul Tanner – Electro-Theremin (bridge)
- June 16 – Western ["Part 1", "Part 2", "Verse", and "Part 3"] (discarded alternate verse, chorus, and bridge)
  - Hal Blaine – overdubbed drums ("Part 1"), drums with sticks ("Part 2")
  - Steve Douglas – grand piano, overdubbed soprano saxophone ("Part 1" and "Part 2")
  - Jim Horn – overdubbed clarinet ("Part 1" and "Part 2")
  - Al De Lory – electric harpsichord
  - Mike Melvoin – Hammond organ
  - Jay Migliori – overdubbed bass clarinet ("Part 1" and "Part 2")
  - Tommy Morgan – overdubbed bass harmonica ("Part 1"), overdubbed harmonica ("Part 2")
  - Bill Pitman – Danelectro bass (with fuzz tone in chorus and bridge)
  - Lyle Ritz – upright bass
  - Paul Tanner – Electro-Theremin
  - Carl Wilson – Fender bass
  - unknown (possibly Brian Wilson) – tambourine ("Part 1")
- June 18 – Western ["Part 1" and "Part 2"] (as above)
  - Bill Green – clarinet
  - Plas Johnson – clarinet
  - Carol Kaye – Fender bass
  - Al De Lory – tack piano ("Part 1"), Hammond organ ("Part 2")
  - Jay Migliori – clarinet
  - Tommy Morgan – bass harmonica ("Part 1"), harmonica ("Part 2")
  - Bill Pitman – Danelectro bass (with fuzz tone in bridge)
  - Paul Tanner – Electro-Theremin
  - Brian Wilson – upright bass
  - Carl Wilson – electric guitar
- c. August 24 through September 1 – Columbia (two vocal sessions; incomplete documentation due to missing tape)
  - Dennis Wilson – lead vocal
- September 1 – Western ["Inspiration" and "Persuasion"] (this session produced the second bridge heard in the final master)
  - Hal Blaine – shaker
  - Tommy Morgan – harmonica, overdubbed bass harmonica
  - Lyle Ritz – upright bass
  - Carl Wilson – shaker
  - Dennis Wilson – Hammond organ
- September 12 – Columbia (this session produced part of the vocals heard in the final master)
  - Al Jardine – backing vocals
  - Bruce Johnston – backing vocals
  - Mike Love – lead and backing vocals
  - Brian Wilson – lead and backing vocals
  - Carl Wilson – lead and backing vocals
  - Dennis Wilson – backing vocals
- September 21 – Columbia (this session produced part of the vocals and part of the Electro-Theremin heard in the final master)
  - Al Jardine – backing vocals
  - Bruce Johnston – backing vocals
  - Mike Love – lead and backing vocals
  - Paul Tanner – Electro-Theremin
  - Brian Wilson – lead and backing vocals
  - Carl Wilson – lead and backing vocals
  - Dennis Wilson – backing vocals

== Charts ==
=== Weekly charts ===
Original release
Chart (1966–1967)	Peak position
Australia Go-Set National Top 40	2
Austria (Ö3 Austria Top 40)	9
Belgium (Ultratop 50 Flanders)	6
Canadian RPM Top Singles	2
Finland (Suomen virallinen lista)	3
France Music Media Monthly	1
Irish Singles Chart	3
Malaysian Singles Chart	1
Netherlands (Dutch Top 40)	4
Netherlands (Single Top 100)	4
Italy (FIMI)	15
New Zealand (Listener)	1
Norway (VG-lista)	2
Singaporean Singles Chart	2
South African Chart	3
Spanish Chart	1
UK Disc & Music Echo	1
UK NME Top 30	1
UK Record Retailer	1
US Billboard Hot 100	1
West Germany (GfK)	8

1976 reissue
Chart (1976)	Peak position
UK (Official Charts Company)	18

Todd Rundgren version
Chart (1976)	Peak position
US Billboard Hot 100	34

=== Year-end charts ===
Chart (1966)	Rank
UK	10
US Billboard Hot 100	33

== Certifications ==
Certifications for "Good Vibrations"
Region	Certification	Certified units/sales
Denmark (IFPI Danmark)	Gold	45,000^{‡}
New Zealand (RMNZ)	2× Platinum	60,000^{‡}
United Kingdom (BPI)	Platinum	600,000^{‡}
United States (RIAA)	3× Platinum	3,000,000^{‡}
^{‡} Sales+streaming figures based on certification alone.

== Awards and accolades ==
Awards for "Good Vibrations"
Year	Organization	Accolade	Result
1967	National Academy of Recording Arts and Sciences	Best Performance by a Vocal Group	Nominated
1967	National Academy of Recording Arts and Sciences	Best Contemporary (R&R) Group Performance, Vocal or Instrumental	Nominated
1967	National Academy of Recording Arts and Sciences	Best Contemporary (R&R) Recording	Nominated
1967	National Academy of Recording Arts and Sciences	Best Arrangement Accompanying a Vocalist(s) or Instrumentalist(s)	Nominated
1994	National Academy of Recording Arts and Sciences	Grammy Hall of Fame Award	Won
2006	Rock and Roll Hall of Fame	Songs that Shaped Rock and Roll	Inducted

Rankings for "Good Vibrations"
Year	Publication	Accolade	Rank
1988	Rolling Stone	100 Best Singles of the Last 25 Years	11
2010	Rolling Stone	500 Greatest Songs of All Time	6

== See also ==
- Limbic resonance
- Brian's Back (song)

== Bibliography ==
- Abbott, Kingsley, ed. (1997). Back to the Beach: A Brian Wilson and the Beach Boys Reader (1st ed.). London: Helter Skelter. pp. 235–236. ISBN 978-1900924023.
- Ashby, Arved Mark, ed. (2004). The Pleasure of Modernist Music: Listening, Meaning, Intention, Ideology. Boydell & Brewer. ISBN 978-1-58046-143-6.
- Badman, Keith (2004). The Beach Boys: The Definitive Diary of America's Greatest Band, on Stage and in the Studio. Backbeat Books. ISBN 978-0-87930-818-6.
- Brend, Mark (2005). Strange Sounds: Offbeat Instruments and Sonic Experiments in Pop. Backbeat. ISBN 9780879308551.
- Candelaria, Lorenzo (2014). American Music: A Panorama, Concise. Cengage Learning. ISBN 978-1-305-16289-1.
- Carlin, Peter Ames (2006). Catch a Wave: The Rise, Fall, and Redemption of the Beach Boys' Brian Wilson. Rodale. ISBN 978-1-59486-320-2.
- Coryton, Demitri (1990). Hits of the ʼ60s: The Million Sellers. B.T. Batsford. ISBN 978-0-7134-5851-0.
- Covach, John Rudolph (2015) [2006]. What's That Sound? An Introduction to Rock and Its History (4th ed.). New York: W. W. Norton & Company. ISBN 9780393937251.
- Dillon, Mark (2012). Fifty Sides of the Beach Boys: The Songs That Tell Their Story. ECW Press. ISBN 978-1-77090-198-8.
- Doggett, Peter (1997). "Smile: The Great Lost Album". In Abbott, Kingsley (ed.). Back to the Beach: A Brian Wilson and the Beach Boys Reader. Helter Skelter. ISBN 978-1-900924-02-3.
- Eden, Dawn (2004). "Smile". In DeRogatis, Jim; Carrillo, Carmél (eds.). Kill Your Idols: A New Generation of Rock Writers Reconsiders the Classics. Fort Lee, N.J.: Barricade Books. ISBN 9781569802762.
- Everett, Walter (2008). The Foundations of Rock: From "Blue Suede Shoes" to "Suite: Judy Blue Eyes". Oxford: Oxford University Press. ISBN 9780199718702.
- Felton, David (1997) [1976]. "The Healing of Brother Bri'". In Abbott, Kingsley (ed.). Back to the Beach: A Brian Wilson and the Beach Boys Reader. Helter Skelter. ISBN 978-1-90092-402-3.
- Francis, Steve Tupai (2022). Kraftwerk's Computer World. Berkeley, CA: University of California Press. ISBN 9781501378980.
- Flory, Andrew (2016). "Fandom and Ontology in Smile". In Lambert, Philip (ed.). Good Vibrations: Brian Wilson and the Beach Boys in Critical Perspective. University of Michigan Press. ISBN 978-0-472-11995-0.
- Gaines, Steven (1986). Heroes and Villains: The True Story of The Beach Boys. New York: Da Capo Press. ISBN 0306806479.
- Gillett, Charlie (1984). The Sound of the City: The Rise of Rock and Roll. Perseus Books Group. ISBN 978-0-306-80683-4.
- Granata, Charles L. (2003). Wouldn't It Be Nice: Brian Wilson and the Making of the Beach Boys' Pet Sounds. A Cappella Books. ISBN 9781556525070.
- Greene, John Robert (2010). America in the Sixties. Syracuse University Press. ISBN 978-0-8156-5133-8.
- Harrison, Daniel (1997). "After Sundown: The Beach Boys' Experimental Music" ( (PDF)). In Covach, John; Boone, Graeme M. (eds.). Understanding Rock: Essays in Musical Analysis. Oxford University Press. pp. 33–57. ISBN 9780199880126. Archived from the original on May 24, 2015.
- Heylin, Clinton (2007). The Act You've Known for All These Years: The Life, and Afterlife, of Sgt. Pepper (1st ed.). Canongate. ISBN 978-1-84195-918-4.
- Hoskyns, Barney (2009). Waiting for the Sun: A Rock 'n' Roll History of Los Angeles. Backbeat Books. ISBN 978-0-87930-943-5.
- Kent, Nick (1995). "The Last Beach Movie Revisited: The Life of Brian Wilson". The Dark Stuff: Selected Writings on Rock Music. Da Capo Press. pp. 1–74. ISBN 0306806460.
- Lambert, Philip (2007). Inside the Music of Brian Wilson: The Songs, Sounds, and Influences of the Beach Boys' Founding Genius. Bloomsbury Publishing. ISBN 978-1-4411-0748-0.
- Lambert, Philip, ed. (2016). Good Vibrations: Brian Wilson and the Beach Boys in Critical Perspective. University of Michigan Press. doi:10.3998/mpub.9275965. ISBN 978-0-472-11995-0.
- Leaf, David (1978). The Beach Boys and the California Myth. New York: Grosset & Dunlap. ISBN 978-0-448-14626-3.
- Love, Mike (2016). Good Vibrations: My Life as a Beach Boy. Penguin Publishing Group. ISBN 978-0-698-40886-9.
- Martin, Bill (2015) [1998], Listening to the Future: The Time of Progressive Rock, Chicago: Open Court, ISBN 9780812699449
- McCulley, Jerry (1997) [1988]. "Trouble in Mind – A Revealing Interview with Brian Wilson". In Abbott, Kingsley (ed.). Back to the Beach: A Brian Wilson and the Beach Boys Reader (1st ed.). London: Helter Skelter. pp. 187–204. ISBN 978-1900924023.
- Murphy, James B. (2015). Becoming the Beach Boys, 1961-1963. McFarland. ISBN 978-0-7864-7365-6.
- Perone, James E. (2004). Music of the Counterculture Era. Greenwood Publishing Group. ISBN 0-313326-89-4.
- Perone, James E. (2015). "The Beach Boys". In Moskowitz, David V. (ed.). The 100 Greatest Bands of All Time: A Guide to the Legends Who Rocked the World. ABC-CLIO. ISBN 978-1-4408-0340-6.
- Pinch, T. J; Trocco, Frank (2009). Analog Days: The Invention and Impact of the Moog Synthesizer. Harvard University Press. ISBN 978-0-674-04216-2.
- Preiss, Byron (1979). The Beach Boys. Ballantine Books. ISBN 978-0-345-27398-7.
- Priore, Domenic, ed. (1995). Look, Listen, Vibrate, Smile!. Last Gasp. ISBN 0-86719-417-0.
- Priore, Domenic (2005). Smile: The Story of Brian Wilson's Lost Masterpiece. London: Sanctuary. ISBN 1860746276.
- Prendergast, Mark (2003). The Ambient Century: From Mahler to Moby – The Evolution of Sound in the Electronic Age. New York, NY: Bloomsbury. ISBN 1-58234-323-3.
- Rooksby, Rikky (2001). Inside Classic Rock Tracks: Songwriting and Recording Secrets of 100 Great Songs from 1960 to the Present Day. Backbeat Books. ISBN 978-0-87930-654-0.
- Romano, Will (2010). Mountains Come Out of the Sky: The Illustrated History of Prog Rock. Milwaukee, WI: Backbeat Books. ISBN 978-0879309916.
- Sanchez, Luis (2014). The Beach Boys' Smile. Bloomsbury Academic. ISBN 9781623562588.
- Savage, Jon (2015). 1966: The Year the Decade Exploded. London: Faber & Faber. ISBN 978-0-571-27763-6.
- Shephard, Tim; Leonard, Anne, eds. (2013). The Routledge Companion to Music and Visual Culture. New York, NY: Routledge. ISBN 9781135956462.
- Siegel, Jules (1997) [1967]. "The Religious Conversion of Brian Wilson: Goodbye Surfing, Hello God". In Abbott, Kingsley (ed.). Back to the Beach: A Brian Wilson and the Beach Boys Reader. Helter Skelter. pp. 51–63. ISBN 978-1-90092-402-3.
- Stanley, Bob (2013). Yeah Yeah Yeah: The Story of Modern Pop. Faber & Faber. ISBN 978-0-571-28198-5.
- Starr, Larry (2007) [2006]. American Popular Music: From Minstrelsy to MP3 (2nd ed.). New York: Oxford University Press. ISBN 9780195300536.
- Stebbins, Jon (2000). Dennis Wilson: The Real Beach Boy. ECW Press. ISBN 978-1-55022-404-7.
- Stebbins, Jon (2011). The Beach Boys FAQ: All That's Left to Know About America's Band. Backbeat Books. ISBN 9781458429148.
- Tobler, John (1978). The Beach Boys. Chartwell Books. ISBN 0890091749.
- Tobler, John (1997) [1978]. "Mike Love: 14 Mins with a Beach Boy". In Abbott, Kingsley (ed.). Back to the Beach: A Brian Wilson and the Beach Boys Reader. Helter Skelter. ISBN 978-1-900924-02-3.
- White, Timothy (1996) [1994]. The Nearest Faraway Place: Brian Wilson, the Beach Boys, and the Southern Californian Experience. Macmillan. ISBN 0333649370.
- Williams, Paul, ed. (2002) [1997]. Brian Wilson & The Beach Boys How Deep Is The Ocean?. Omnibus Press. ISBN 9780711991033.
- Williams, Paul; Anderle, David (2002) [1968]. "How Smile Got Lost (conversation with David Anderle, parts I & II, 11/67)". In Williams, Paul (ed.). Brian Wilson & The Beach Boys How Deep Is The Ocean?. Omnibus Press. ISBN 9780711991033.
- Wilson, Brian; Gold, Todd (1991). Wouldn't It Be Nice: My Own Story. New York: HarperCollins. ISBN 978-0-06018-313-4.
- Wilson, Brian; Greenman, Ben (2016). I Am Brian Wilson: A Memoir. Da Capo Press. ISBN 978-0-306-82307-7.
- Zollo, Paul (2003) [1991]. Songwriters On Songwriting: Revised And Expanded (4th ed.). New York: Da Capo Press. ISBN 9780306812651.
