= The Pet Sounds Sessions =

Box set by the Beach Boys
- Released: November 4, 1997
- Recorded: July 1965 – April 1966
- Length: 256:20
- Label: Capitol
- Producer: Brian Wilson (original recordings)
- Compilers: Brian Wilson; David Leaf; Mark Linett

The Beach Boys chronology
Stars and Stripes Vol. 1 (1996)	The Pet Sounds Sessions (1997)	Endless Harmony Soundtrack (1998)

Singles from The Pet Sounds Sessions
- 1. "I Just Wasn't Made for These Times" / "Here Today" Released: June 4, 1996

The Pet Sounds Sessions is a 4-CD box set by the American rock band the Beach Boys. Released on November 4, 1997, by Capitol Records, it compiles tracks from the group's 11th studio album Pet Sounds (1966) and its 1965–66 recording sessions. The entire album is included in its original mono mix, as well as a specially-created digital stereo mix. The set also contains instrumental tracks, vocals-only tracks, alternate mixes, and edited highlights from the recording sessions for many of the album's songs, along with several tracks not included on the album.

The box set was nominated for Best Historical Album at the Grammy Awards of 1999. In 2011, it was followed by The Smile Sessions, a similar compilation devoted to the recording of the Beach Boys' unfinished Smile project.

== Background ==
Original producer Brian Wilson writes in the liner notes to The Pet Sounds Sessions:

It was a heart and soul album; I worked very, very hard on it. The thing is, I’m glad we’re doing this new Pet Sounds reissue because the Pet Sounds box set is going to be very revealing to the public as to just what sort of music makers we really are. ... When we were making Pet Sounds we were absolutely positive we were cutting a milestone record. Carl [Wilson] and I knew for sure we were into something heavier than hell, and we just went with it.

Compiler David Leaf explains the purpose of the new compilation: "The first three CDs of this box set are designed to give you a sense of how Brian and the studio musicians cut the tracks [from Pet Sounds] and also to give you a unique glimpse into the harmonic magic of the Beach Boys singing." He adds: "It is not hyperbole to say that for every pop and rock group that followed in the Beach Boys wake, Pet Sounds became an audio benchmark. ... Since that time, nothing has really changed." Leaf had only a minor role in the set, with all creative work, including editing, mixing, and mastering. being done by lead producer Mark Linett.

== Stereo mix ==
Pet Sounds was first released in 1966 in monaural and duophonic formats. Overseen by Brian Wilson and produced and engineered by Mark Linett, the set includes the first stereo mix of Pet Sounds. These new mixes were made possible by the survival of the original Pet Sounds multitrack tapes. Advances in recording technology allowed the compilers to digitally sync multi-track stems that had been ping-ponged numerous times prior to their final mono mixdown.

The new mixes created for the box set were made in January–February 1996. Linett wrote: "In mixing Pet Sounds in stereo, every attempt was made to duplicate the feel and sound of the original mono mixes. Vocal and instrumental parts that Brian left off the record in 1966 were noted and duplicated, as were the fades." To this end, a Scully model 280 4-track was used to transfer the analog reels to digital multi-tracks – the same model used for Pet Sounds. The mix was then processed through an original tube console from United Western Recorders in the 1960s.

Some exceptions remain, and so the stereo mix of Pet Sounds does contain some differences from the original mono mix. Among them are the uses of alternate vocal parts for the bridge of "Wouldn't It Be Nice" and the end of "God Only Knows" due to the original tracks no longer existing. "You Still Believe in Me" features a single tracked vocal instead of the doubled vocal of the original due to a missing tape. In the mono version, chatter can be heard buried in various tracks; instances of them were omitted from the stereo version at Brian's request.

== Release ==
There was a minor controversy regarding a significant 18-month delay in the release of the box set (originally planned for May 1996 to coincide with the 30th anniversary of the album's original issue). Reportedly, Mike Love was dissatisfied with the accompanying essays that allegedly understated his involvement in the album's making. The original liner notes had featured none of his comments, even though other band members were interviewed, and new notes were subsequently commissioned to Dennis Diken. Biographer Timothy White said that "The Beach Boys apparently didn't get the track selections until late in the production phase, and they all had misgivings about how Capitol envisioned it."

== Reception ==
Professional ratings
Review scores
Source	Rating
AllMusic	4.5/5 stars
The Austin Chronicle	5/5 stars
Encyclopedia of Popular Music	5/5 stars
The Guardian	5/5 stars
MusicHound	4/5
NME	10/10 stars
Q	5/5 stars
The Rolling Stone Album Guide	5/5 stars
Uncut	5/5 stars
Wall of Sound	70/100

AllMusic calls the compilation "a fascinating, educational listen, even if it's not necessarily indispensable." Q gave the "enlightening" box set a perfect score and wrote that "the backing music tracks sans vocals opens your ears to a bevy of awe-inspiring nuances previously obscured by singing. At the same time, the isolated vocal tracks are nothing less than spiritual in their emotive wallop." The New York Observer's D. Strauss called the stereo mix "pointless", adding, "I must admit that, as a music geek, listening to Mr. Wilson hold myriad consultations on when to beep the bicycle horn in 'You Still Believe in Me' carries a portentous thrill".

The compilation was pivotal to the inception of the Brian Wilson biopic Love & Mercy, as director Bill Pohlad enthuses: "It's just so beautiful and impactful for me to listen to that. So the idea of trying to capture that on film was certainly a big part of my interest in making the movie."

== Track listing ==
Disc one: The Stereo Mix; Sessions, Part 1
No.	Title	Writer(s)	Length
1.	"Wouldn't It Be Nice" (Stereo mix)	Brian Wilson/Tony Asher/Mike Love	2:33
2.	"You Still Believe in Me" (Stereo mix)	Wilson, Asher	2:36
3.	"That's Not Me" (Stereo mix)	Wilson, Asher	2:31
4.	"Don't Talk (Put Your Head on My Shoulder)" (Stereo mix)	Wilson, Asher	2:58
5.	"I'm Waiting for the Day" (Stereo mix)	Wilson, Love	3:06
6.	"Let's Go Away for Awhile" (Stereo mix)	Wilson	2:24
7.	"Sloop John B" (Stereo mix)	traditional, arranged by Wilson	2:59
8.	"God Only Knows" (Stereo mix)	Wilson, Asher	2:54
9.	"I Know There's an Answer" (Stereo mix)	Wilson, Terry Sachen, Love	3:18
10.	"Here Today" (Stereo mix)	Wilson, Asher	3:07
11.	"I Just Wasn't Made for These Times" (Stereo mix)	Wilson, Asher	3:21
12.	"Pet Sounds" (Stereo mix)	Wilson	2:37
13.	"Caroline, No" (Stereo mix)	Wilson, Asher	2:53
14.	"Sloop John B" (Highlights from tracking date)	traditional, arranged by Wilson	1:04
15.	"Sloop John B" (Stereo backing track)	traditional, arranged by Wilson	3:18
16.	"Trombone Dixie" (Highlights from tracking date)	Wilson	1:26
17.	"Trombone Dixie" (Stereo backing track)	Wilson	2:50
18.	"Pet Sounds" (Highlights from tracking date)	Wilson	0:57
19.	"Pet Sounds" (Stereo backing track)	Wilson	2:48
20.	"Let's Go Away For Awhile" (Highlights from tracking date)	Wilson	2:20
21.	"Let's Go Away For Awhile" (Stereo backing track)	Wilson	2:51
22.	"Wouldn't It Be Nice" (Highlights from tracking date)	Wilson, Asher, Love	7:20
23.	"Wouldn't It Be Nice" (Stereo backing track)	Wilson, Asher, Love	2:34
24.	"Wouldn't It Be Nice" (Stereo track with background vocals)	Wilson, Asher, Love	2:34
25.	"You Still Believe in Me" (Intro – session)	Wilson, Asher	1:39
26.	"You Still Believe in Me" (Intro – master take)	Wilson, Asher	0:15
27.	"You Still Believe in Me" (Highlights from tracking date)	Wilson, Asher	1:11
28.	"You Still Believe in Me" (Stereo backing track)	Wilson, Asher	2:37

Disc two: Sessions, Part 2
No.	Title	Writer(s)	Length
1.	"Caroline, No" (Highlights from tracking date)		4:16
2.	"Caroline, No" (Stereo backing track)		2:53
3.	"Hang On to Your Ego" (Highlights from tracking date)	Brian Wilson, Terry Sachen	4:47
4.	"Hang On to Your Ego" (Stereo backing track)	Wilson, Sachen	3:23
5.	"Don't Talk (Put Your Head on My Shoulder)" (Brian's instrumental demo)		2:20
6.	"Don't Talk (Put Your Head on My Shoulder)" (Stereo backing track)		3:11
7.	"Don't Talk (Put Your Head on My Shoulder)" (String overdub)		1:48
8.	"I Just Wasn't Made for These Times" (Highlights from tracking date)		2:59
9.	"I Just Wasn't Made for These Times" (Stereo backing track)		3:47
10.	"That's Not Me" (Highlights from tracking date)		1:52
11.	"That's Not Me" (Stereo backing track)		2:46
12.	"Good Vibrations" (Highlights from tracking date)	Wilson, Mike Love	2:41
13.	"Good Vibrations" (Stereo backing track)	Wilson, Love	3:15
14.	"I'm Waiting for the Day" (Highlights from tracking date)	Wilson, Love	5:25
15.	"I'm Waiting for the Day" (Stereo backing track)	Wilson, Love	3:14
16.	"God Only Knows" (Highlights from tracking date)		9:25
17.	"God Only Knows" (Stereo backing track)		3:06
18.	"Here Today" (Highlights from tracking date)		6:37
19.	"Here Today" (Stereo backing track)		4:55

Disc three: Stack-O-Vocals; Alternate Versions
No.	Title	Writer(s)	Date of mix	Length
1.	"Wouldn't It Be Nice" (A cappella)	Brian Wilson, Tony Asher, Mike Love		2:37
2.	"You Still Believe in Me" (A cappella)			2:47
3.	"That's Not Me" (A cappella)			2:28
4.	"Don't Talk (Put Your Head on My Shoulder)" (A cappella)			3:07
5.	"I'm Waiting for the Day" (A cappella)	Wilson, Love		3:02
6.	"Sloop John B" (A cappella)	traditional, arranged by Wilson		3:09
7.	"God Only Knows" (A cappella)			2:49
8.	"I Know There's an Answer" (A cappella)	Wilson, Love, Terry Sachen		2:19
9.	"Here Today" (A cappella)			3:29
10.	"I Just Wasn't Made for These Times" (A cappella)			3:22
11.	"Caroline, No" (A cappella)			1:54
12.	"Caroline, No" (Promotional Spot #1)		unknown	0:32
13.	"Wouldn't It Be Nice" (Mono alternate mix)	Wilson, Asher, Love	March 3, 1966	2:29
14.	"You Still Believe in Me" (Mono alternate mix)		February 16, 1966	2:23
15.	"Don't Talk (Put Your Head on My Shoulder)" (Vocal snippet)		unknown	0:56
16.	"I'm Waiting for the Day" (Mono alternate mix, Mike sings lead)	Wilson, Love	March 12, 1966	3:02
17.	"Sloop John B" (Mono alternate mix, Carl sings first verse)	traditional, arranged by Wilson	unknown	3:05
18.	"God Only Knows" (Mono alternate mix, with sax solo)		March 12, 1966	2:49
19.	"Hang On to Your Ego"	Wilson, Sachen	February 16, 1966	3:13
20.	"Here Today" (Mono alternate mix, Brian sings lead)		unknown	3:07
21.	"I Just Wasn't Made for These Times" (Mono alternate mix)		unknown	3:11
22.	"Banana & Louie"		unknown	0:05
23.	"Caroline, No" (Original speed, stereo mix)		January 31, 1966 (vocal)	2:24
24.	"Dog Barking Session" (Outtakes)		March 22, 1966	0:34
25.	"Caroline, No" (Promotional spot #2)		unknown	0:28
26.	"God Only Knows" (with a cappella tag)		March 12, 1966	2:56
27.	"Wouldn't It Be Nice" (Mono alternate mix)	Wilson, Asher, Love	unknown	2:28
28.	"Sloop John B" (Brian sings lead throughout)	traditional, arranged by Wilson	unknown	3:04
29.	"God Only Knows" (Mono alternate mix, Brian sings lead)		March 22, 1966	2:42
30.	"Caroline, No" (Original speed, mono mix)		January 30, 1966 (vocal)	3:03

Disc four: Pet Sounds Re-Mastered Mono Mix (same as tracks 1–13 of disc one)

== Charts ==
Chart performance for The Pet Sounds Sessions
Chart (2026)	Peak position
Scottish Albums (Official Charts)	26
UK Albums Sales (OCC)	19
