= You Still Believe in Me =

1966 song by the Beach Boys

Song by the Beach Boys

from the album Pet Sounds
- Released: May 16, 1966
- Recorded: January 24, 1966 – March 12 1966
- Studio: Western, Hollywood
- Genre: Chamber pop
- Length: 2:36
- Label: Capitol
- Songwriters: Brian Wilson; Tony Asher
- Producer: Brian Wilson

Licensed audio
- "You Still Believe in Me" on YouTube

Audio sample
- file; help

"You Still Believe in Me" is a song by American rock band the Beach Boys from their 1966 album Pet Sounds. Initially conceived as "In My Childhood", it was the first songwriting collaboration between Brian Wilson, the group's de facto leader, and songwriter Tony Asher. Wilson sang the lead vocal.

The lyrics are about a man who, while acknowledging his irresponsible behavior and unfaithfulness, is impressed by the unwavering loyalty of his lover, who is left shouldering the stability of their relationship. Wilson's then-wife Marilyn surmised that this choice of subject matter was indebted to the couple's marital struggles at the time.

One of the first songs produced for Pet Sounds, Wilson recorded the track between January and March 1966 with the aid of his bandmates, Asher, and 13 session musicians who variously played harpsichord, clarinets, 12-string electric guitars, timpani, finger cymbals, pianos, basses, and bicycle horn. Wilson and Asher created the song's ethereal intro by plucking a piano's strings with a bobby pin.

== Background ==
"You Still Believe in Me" was originally conceived by Wilson as a song titled "In My Childhood". According to biographer Peter Ames Carlin, "Brian already had a set of lyrics that fit with the tune's sweet vaguely melancholy sound and quirky textural effects (a bicycle horn and bell). But he didn't like his lyrics anymore and wanted to adapt the tune to another concept." In December 1965, Wilson contacted jingle writer Tony Asher about a possible lyric collaboration, wanting to do something "completely different" with someone he had never written with before. Asher accepted the offer, and within ten days, they were writing together. Wilson played some of the music he had recently recorded and gave a cassette to Asher containing the backing track to "In My Childhood".

There are discrepancies from Asher as to whether "In My Childhood" had a recorded vocal or a different melody at this juncture. Quoted in the 1978 biography The Beach Boys and the California Myth, Asher said, "We wiped off those vocals and that melody and rewrote it. ... The [chord] changes were the only thing that stayed the same." However, in a 1996 interview, Asher said, "Brian never let me hear the lyric to it. I didn't hear the vocals, but I could hear a little bit of some backgrounds and stuff that were leaking through other [microphones] but I didn't really hear any melody to it." Later, Asher revised his story again, "If I remember correctly, the original melody sounded exactly the way it does on the album, and someone had already written lyrics."

The result of Asher's tryout was "You Still Believe in Me", and the success of the piece convinced Wilson that Asher was the wordsmith he had been looking for. In a 1996 interview, Wilson summarized "You Still Believe in Me" as a "little 'Boys Choir'-type song with me doing the soprano. Very, very spiritual."

== Lyrics ==
I always thought [Brian] wrote that with me in mind. He knew that he was not a good husband, and that I was very lonely, and really didn't get much back from him, and he made me cry all the time, because it was hard to understand that kind of life, what was going on for him. It was like there wasn't much of a relationship [between us].

— Wilson's then-wife Marilyn

Biographer Mark Dillon described the lyrics of "You Still Believe in Me" as "a musing about the ups and downs of adult romance". In the song, the narrator expresses appreciation for his lover's unwavering loyalty while confessing to his irresponsible behavior and unfaithfulness. He admits that he is "not where I should be", and though he puts forth effort in the relationship, he has occasionally "fail[ed] myself". The relationship's stability is thus shouldered by the more mature partner.

As with other songs on Pet Sounds, the subject matter of "You Still Believe in Me" derived from Asher and Wilson's intimate discussions regarding their experiences in life and romance. (Note: Given the tight chronology of their collaboration, Lambert writes, "Asher seem[ed] to have learned a lot about Brian's inner feelings after only one day of discussions, and perhaps he knew some of Brian's earlier songs that develop similar themes, like 'She Knows Me Too Well,' 'Guess I'm Dumb,' 'Kiss Me, Baby,' and 'You're So Good to Me.") Wilson stated that the song is about a man who feels free to express love in a fashion associated with the opposite sex. He explained to an interviewer, "'You Still Believe In Me' was more of what I would call a man who would not be afraid to take all of his clothes off and sing like a girl because he had feelings for people from that perspective. I was able to close my eyes and go into a world and sing a little more effeminately and more sweet—which allows a lot more love to come down through me, you know what I mean?" (Note: Wilson went on to say, "It's like Kenny Rogers. There's an example of a guy who has a fairly masculine sounding voice. 'You Still Believe In Me' was quite the opposite.")

Brian's then-wife Marilyn felt that Brian had based the song on their marriage. Biographer Timothy White similarly attributed an autobiographical element to the song as viewed through Brian's perspective. He writes,

"You Still Believe in Me" was an interior monologue of self-doubt, exploring and debating Marilyn's patient capacity to forgive Brian's selfishness and creative absorption. Contrasting the rude force of their frequent breakups with the softer tone of their reconciliations, Brian admits the only time he feels in control of the relationship is when she's providing the stability, although he's unable to be what she wants him to be. There is no resolution of the problem, Brian concluding that he wants to "cry."

"You Still Believe in Me" marks the first song on Pet Sounds that contains such introspective themes which pervade the rest of the album. Commenting on its placement on the record, music critic Jim Esch said the song develops "a theme inaugurated and suggested by 'Wouldn't It Be Nice': fragile lovers buckling under the pressure of external forces they can't control, self-imposed romantic expectations and personal limitations, while simultaneously trying to maintain faith in one other."

== Composition ==
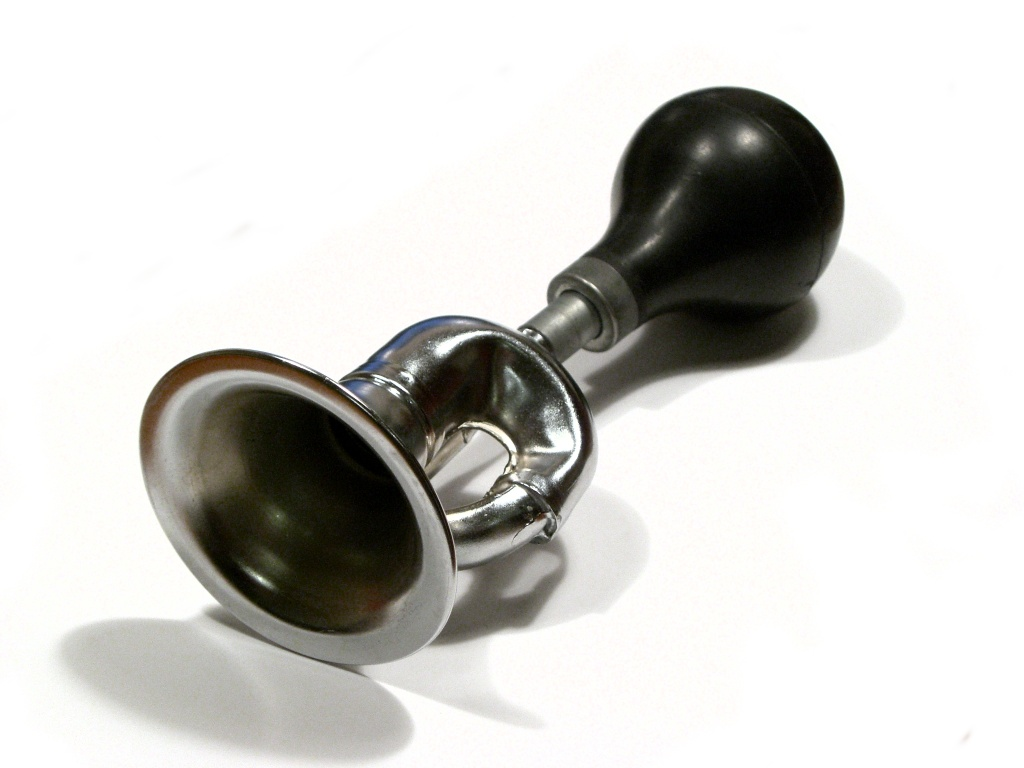
A bicycle horn. This tool was paired with a bicycle bell for part of the percussion in "You Still Believe in Me".

"You Still Believe in Me" is the only composition on Pet Sounds set in the key of B major, and the first of only five tracks on the album that does not modulate or waver into other keys. (Note: The other four tracks are "I'm Waiting for the Day", "Sloop John B", "I Know There's an Answer" and "I Just Wasn't Made for These Times".) The song features frequent use of the ii–V–I turnaround (six uninterrupted repeats of I–ii♯7–V♯7). According to musicologist Philip Lambert, the repetition in the verse progression appears to reflect "the constancy of the girl's faith and spirit", whereas the simplistic melodies and overall mood of the piece "captures the guy's immaturity". After the first two sections, the progression rests on a G♯ chord (VI), occurring on the line "love to me", and is followed shortly by the hook in the chorus. Biographer David Leaf quoted an unnamed "classically-trained musician" discussing the song:

[It] compositionally embodies the unique manner in which Brian writes music. In a sense, Brian created a new way of using the scale. His progressions are always going up, then pausing before they go up again, like they're going towards God. As you'll hear clearly on this song, Brian doesn't come down in the middle of a progression.

The changes in the verses are contrasted with the more complex progression heard in the chorus ("You [vi7/2̂] still be- [ii7/1̂] -lieve [vi7/5̂] in [♭VI] me"). At this point in the piece, Wilson's solo lead vocal is joined by full group vocals. Lambert characterizes the abrupt shift in harmonic complexity as evocative of a music box being "'motorized' by a few turns of a crank on the back of the box", while the introduction of "more sophisticated, jazzified chord changes" further solidifies the contrast between the verses. The resolution to ♭VI (G major), down a major third from the root, is similar to the other songs on the album which do change key, albeit from down a minor third.

Musicologist James Perone writes that the "snaky" melody in "I want to cry" represents one of the "high points" of the piece. He notes a contrast from the melody heard in prior sections, as the third phrase begins a step higher than the first two melodic phrases, which are identical. In his belief, "This corresponds to the singer's descriptions of all the ways in which his lover continues to forgive him." Perone adds that "the use of a stepwise falloff of the interval of a third at the end of each verse" is a common device in Wilson's songs, one that often figures "in his introspective songs of alienation (e.g., 'In My Room')."

Like "Wouldn't It Be Nice", there are tempo changes throughout the song. The ending, recorded before Asher rewrote the lyrics, features the sounds of a bicycle bell and horn, a remnant of the song's original childhood theme. (Note: Asher said, "The bicycle bell part—that was kept ... not because anybody thought it was a good idea to keep it [but] because it was mixed down into a track. You didn't have twenty-four tracks in those days, and you mixed some tracks that would lock in.") Granata writes, "the imaginative use of bicycle bell, bicycle horn, and finger cymbals [helped] evoke a juvenile air that [would mirror] the immature attitude projected by [Asher's] lyric."

== Recording ==
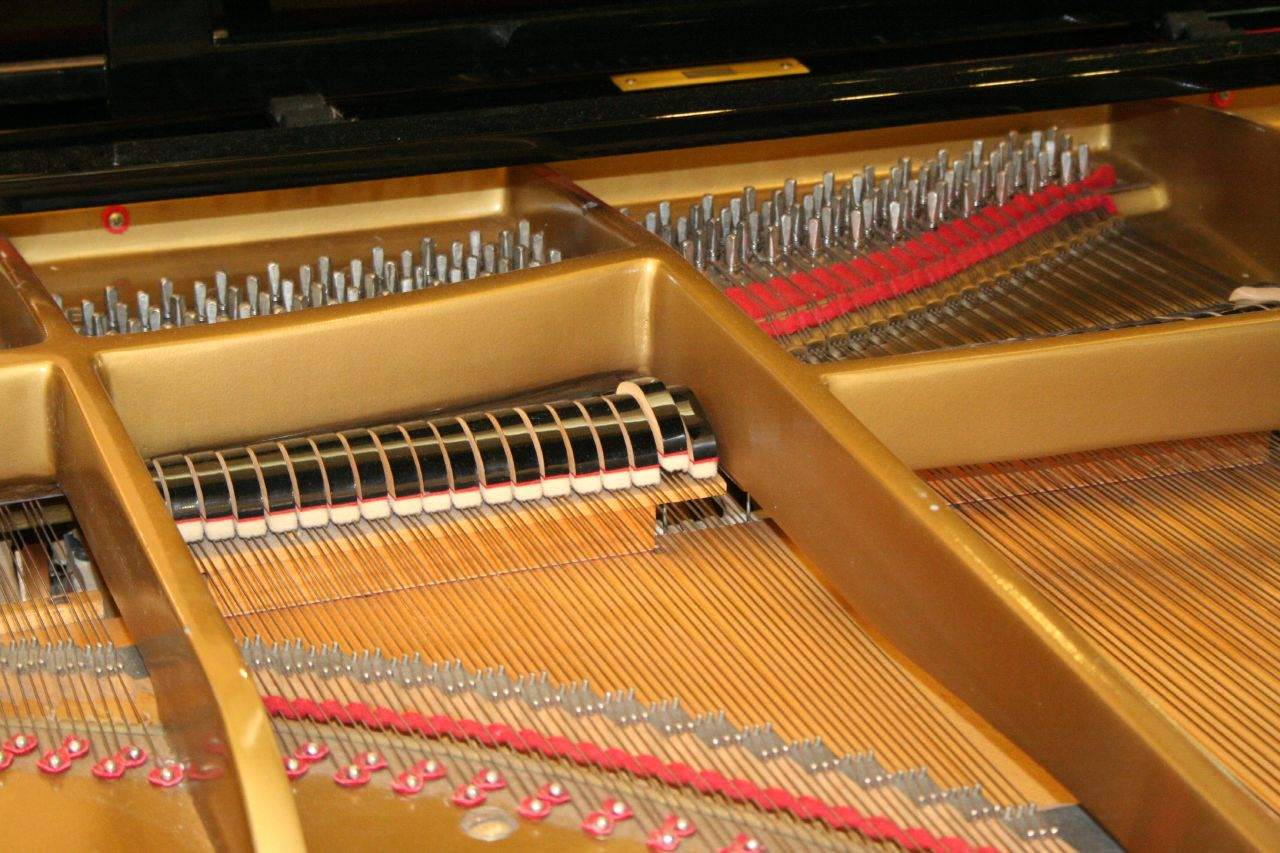
The inside of a piano. To create the harpsichord sound heard at the beginning of the song, Wilson plucked piano strings with a bobby pin while Asher held the foot pedals.

Wilson produced the first session for the instrumental track, logged as "Untitled", on January 24, 1966 at Western Studio. On March 12, 1966, the introduction to the song, now titled "You Still Believe in Me", was recorded at Western. Wilson and Asher created the backing track of this section by plucking a piano's strings with a bobby pin. Asher explained:

We were trying to do something that would sound sort of, I guess, like a harpsichord but a little more ethereal than that. I am plucking the strings by leaning inside the piano and Brian is holding down the notes on the keyboard so they will ring when I pluck them. I plucked the strings with paper clips, hairpins, bobby pins and several other things until Brian got the sound he wanted.

Group vocals were overdubbed on or before February 16 at Western. Lead vocals were partially redone at a later date; the double-tracking for Wilson's lead was recorded live-to-tape during the mono mixdown. This meant that when Pet Sounds was first remixed for stereo in 1996, this double-tracked vocal could not be isolated. Instead, only the single-tracked vocal was used on the stereo remix included with The Pet Sounds Sessions (1997).

== Critical reception ==
On May 16, 1966, "You Still Believe in Me" was released as the second track on Pet Sounds. In his self-described "unbiased" review of the album for Record Mirror, Norman Jopling described the song as "slightly off tune ... [it has] a delicate backing which thank heavens doesn't interfere with the complicated but smoothflowing [sic] harmonies ..." AllMusic reviewer Jim Esch decreed that the song "signalled to listeners of Pet Sounds that something new and wonderful was happening to pop music" and referred to the ending coda as the "moment that you realize that something in pop music has irrevocably crossed the line and merged with a classical sensibility."

== Influence ==
The Beatles' Paul McCartney regarded the track as one of his favorites on Pet Sounds. In a 1990 interview, McCartney stated of "You Still Believe in Me":

I love that melody. That kills me, that melody. [hums the first verse, bursts into song at "I wanna cry."] That's my favorite, I think. The way that's arranged, where it goes away very quietly. I was in the car the other night, and I was telling the kids, saying, "wait, wait, here it comes." And then it comes back, and it's so beautiful right at the end, comes surging back in these multi-colored harmonies. Sends shivers up my spine. That's one of my favorite tracks.

Robert Schneider, frontman of the Apples in Stereo, similarly praised "You Still Believe in Me" as his favorite song on the album. Schneider said, "It's just so beautiful ... when I think about all the qualities I like about Pet Sounds, really it's this song I bring to mind".

== Live performances ==
The Beach Boys performed "You Still Believe in Me" at their live concerts during the early 1970s. One of these performances was included on the band's 1973 album The Beach Boys in Concert.

In 2001, the song was performed by Wilson Phillips – a singing trio which included Wilson's two daughters Carnie and Wendy – at a Brian Wilson tribute concert held at the Radio City Music Hall in New York. Wilson, who attended the show, later remarked of this performance, "it blew my fucking mind".

== Personnel ==
Per archivists John Brode, Will Crerar, Joshilyn Hoisington, and Craig Slowinski.

The Beach Boys

- Al Jardine – harmony vocals
- Bruce Johnston – harmony vocals
- Mike Love – bass harmony vocals
- Brian Wilson – lead, falsetto harmony and intro vocals; Steinway plucked piano strings (plucking); producer
- Carl Wilson – harmony vocals

Guests

- Tony Asher – Steinway plucked piano strings (foot pedals), intro vocals
- Marilyn Wilson – intro vocals

Session musicians

- Hal Blaine – bicycle horn, bicycle bell
- Glen Campbell – double-tracked 12-string electric lead guitars (Mosrite Mark XII)
- Al De Lory – harpsichords
- Steve Douglas – Steinway grand piano
- Bill Green – bass clarinet
- Jim Horn – clarinet
- Plas Johnson – clarinet
- Carol Kaye – Fender Precision electric bass
- Barney Kessel – double-tracked 12-string electric mando-guitars (Danelectro Bellzouki 7010)
- Jay Migliori – clarinet
- Lyle Ritz – upright bass
- Julius Wechter – timpani, finger cymbals

Technical staff

- Chuck Britz – engineer (instrumental and vocals)

== Cover versions ==
- 1981 – Kirsty MacColl, single
- 2001 – Elvis Costello and Anne Sofie von Otter, For the Stars
- 2005 – M. Ward, Transistor Radio

== Bibliography ==
- Badman, Keith (2004). The Beach Boys: The Definitive Diary of America's Greatest Band, on Stage and in the Studio. Backbeat Books. ISBN 978-0-87930-818-6.
- Carlin, Peter Ames (2006). Catch a Wave: The Rise, Fall, and Redemption of the Beach Boys' Brian Wilson. Rodale. ISBN 978-1-59486-320-2.
- Dillon, Mark (2012). Fifty Sides of the Beach Boys: The Songs That Tell Their Story. ECW Press. ISBN 978-1-77090-198-8.
- Doe, Andrew; Tobler, John (2009). "The Beach Boys – Pet Sounds – May 1966". In Charlesworth, Chris (ed.). 25 Albums that Rocked the World. Omnibus Press. ISBN 978-0-85712-044-1.
- Leaf, David (1978). The Beach Boys and the California Myth. New York: Grosset & Dunlap. ISBN 978-0-448-14626-3.
- Granata, Charles L. (2003). Wouldn't It Be Nice: Brian Wilson and the Making of the Beach Boys' Pet Sounds. A Cappella Books. ISBN 9781556525070.
- Lambert, Philip (2007). Inside the Music of Brian Wilson: The Songs, Sounds, and Influences of the Beach Boys' Founding Genius. Bloomsbury Publishing. ISBN 978-1-4411-0748-0.
- Lambert, Philip (March 2008). "Brian Wilson's Pet Sounds". Twentieth-Century Music. 5 (1). Cambridge University Press: 109–133. doi:10.1017/S1478572208000625. S2CID 162871617. Archived from the original on October 2, 2021.
- Lambert, Philip (2016). "Brian Wilson's Harmonic Language". In Lambert, Philip (ed.). Good Vibrations: Brian Wilson and the Beach Boys in Critical Perspective. University of Michigan Press. ISBN 978-0-472-11995-0.
- O'Regan, Jadey (2016). "When I Grow Up". In Lambert, Philip (ed.). Good Vibrations: Brian Wilson and the Beach Boys in Critical Perspective. University of Michigan Press. ISBN 978-0-472-11995-0.
- Perone, James E. (2012). The Album: A Guide to Pop Music's Most Provocative, Influential, and Important Creations. ABC-CLIO. ISBN 978-0-313-37907-9.
- White, Timothy (1996). The Nearest Faraway Place: Brian Wilson, the Beach Boys, and the Southern Californian Experience. Macmillan. ISBN 0333649370.
- Wilson, Brian; Greenman, Ben (2016). I Am Brian Wilson: A Memoir. Da Capo Press. ISBN 978-0-306-82307-7.
