= God Only Knows =

1966 song by the Beach Boys

Single by the Beach Boys

from the album Pet Sounds
- A-side: "Wouldn't It Be Nice"
- Released: July 18, 1966
- Recorded: March 10 – April 11, 1966
- Studio: Western and Columbia, Hollywood
- Genre: Baroque rock; avant-pop
- Length: 2:55
- Label: Capitol
- Songwriters: Brian Wilson; Tony Asher
- Producer: Brian Wilson

The Beach Boys singles chronology
| "Sloop John B" (1966) | "Wouldn't It Be Nice" / "God Only Knows" (1966) | "Good Vibrations" (1966) |

Audio video
- "God Only Knows" on YouTube

Audio sample
- file; help

"God Only Knows" is a song by the American rock band the Beach Boys from their 1966 album Pet Sounds. Written by Brian Wilson and Tony Asher, it is a Baroque-fusion love song distinguished in popular music for its harmonies and orchestration. The words are expressed from the perspective of a narrator who asserts that life without their lover could be fathomed only by God, then considered taboo to name in the title or lyric of a pop song. Wilson attributed its impetus to Asher's affinity for standards such as "Stella by Starlight". Unique in popular music, "God Only Knows" contains three contrapuntal vocal parts, an ambiguous key (E or A major), and a series of repeating vocal rounds that conclude the song.

Wilson produced the record between March and April 1966, enlisting eighteen session musicians who variously played drums, sleigh bells, paper orange juice cups, clarinets, flutes, strings, French horn, accordion, guitars, upright bass, harpsichord, and a piano prepared with tacks and tape. His brother Carl Wilson sang lead, a vocal performance that became regarded as his best ever, with Brian and Bruce Johnston providing additional harmonies. The song was issued in July 1966 as the B-side of "Wouldn't It Be Nice" and peaked at number 39 on the Billboard Hot 100. In other countries, it was the single's A-side, reaching the top 10 in the UK, Canada, Norway, and the Netherlands.

"God Only Knows" is often praised as one of the greatest songs of all time and as the Beach Boys' finest record. Comentators have compared its advanced compositional structure to the work of classical composers; many songwriters, including Paul McCartney and Jimmy Webb, have cited it as their favorite song of all time. In 2004, it was included in the Rock and Roll Hall of Fame's "500 Songs That Shaped Rock and Roll". In 2021, it was ranked number 11 in Rolling Stone's list of the "500 Greatest Songs of All Time".

== Inspiration ==
"God Only Knows" is among the several songs that Brian Wilson and Tony Asher wrote for the Beach Boys' Pet Sounds album. Asher felt that it was the pair's most effortless collaboration, remembering that Wilson "spent more time tweaking the instrumental part than we did writing the words!" Recalling "God Only Knows", Wilson acknowledged that he himself had "not written that kind of song" before and explained, "I think Tony had a musical influence on me somehow. After about ten years, I started thinking about it deeper ... And I remember him talking about [the 1944 standard] 'Stella by Starlight' and he had a certain love for classic songs." Asher concurred that he felt he had inspired Wilson to write the song.

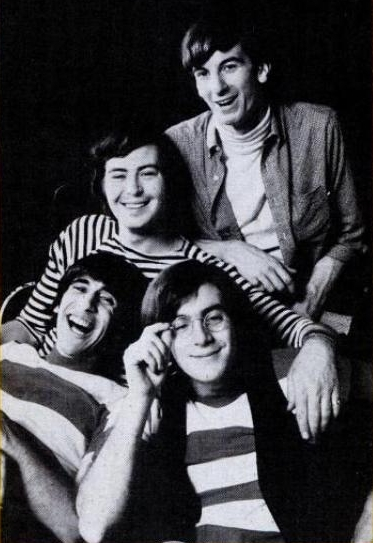
The Lovin' Spoonful's 1965 hit "You Didn't Have to Be So Nice" was a possible influence on the song.

Wilson's 1991 memoir states that the melody for "God Only Knows" was derived from "a John Sebastian song I had been listening to". When presented with this information, Asher and Sebastian said they were unaware of such a connection. Biographer Mark Dillon suggested that Wilson's inspiration would likely have been the vocal layering on "You Didn't Have to Be So Nice", a recent hit by Sebastian's band the Lovin' Spoonful. (Note: The Lovin' Spoonful toured with the Beach Boys in March and April 1966. In addition, Wilson saw them perform in December 1965 at The Trip, a club on Los Angeles's Sunset Strip, where they held a multi-week residency.) In later interviews, Wilson said that he wrote "God Only Knows" as an attempt to match the standard of the Beatles' album Rubber Soul (released in December 1965). In his recollection, he was under the influence of marijuana and was "so blown away" with the album that he sat at his piano and began writing the song.

Asked about Pet Sounds in various interviews, Wilson frequently emphasized the album's spiritual qualities, saying that he had held prayer sessions with his brother Carl and "kind of made [the album] a religious ceremony." At the time of the song's writing, he was married to singer Marilyn Rovell. Writing in his book about the album, Jim Fusilli noted a closing phrase Wilson had once written to his wife in 1964: "Yours 'til God wants us apart." In a 1976 radio interview, Wilson said that the song was not written for anyone in particular. Marilyn, who felt that much of the lyrical content on Pet Sounds was aimed at her, commented of the song, "I'm the only one here, so it must be about me. Then I would think, 'No it wasn't.'"

== Lyrics ==
The first time I heard it, Brian played it for me at the piano. And I went, "Oh my god, he's talking about God in a record." It was pretty daring to me. And it was another time I thought to myself, "Oh, boy, he's really taking a chance." I thought it was almost too religious. Too square.

— Wilson's then-wife Marilyn

At the time the song was written, referencing "God" in a title or lyric was generally considered a taboo for pop music, and there had been at least one recent instance of a record being banned from radio for having words such as "hell" or "damn". Asher said that he and Wilson had "lengthy conversations" about the lyric, "because unless you were Kate Smith and you were singing 'God Bless America', no one thought you could say 'God' in a song. ... He said, 'We'll just never get any air play.'" (Note: Although it has been suggested that it was the first pop song to mention "God" in the title, another song with a similar lyrical message called "God Only Knows" was recorded in 1954 by the doo-wop combo the Capris.) He believed that Wilson agreed to the title after being told by other people that it was "an opportunity to be really far out [because] it would cause some controversy, which he didn't mind." Dillon wrote that referring to God may have also been viewed as "a square move" due to the nascent decline of traditional religion in the United States.

In the lyrics, the narrator anticipates the dissolution of their romantic relationship, and asserts that life without their lover could only be fathomed by God. The deceptive opening line, "I may not always love you", was the subject of another argument between the songwriters. According to Asher, "I liked that twist, and fought to start the song that way. Working with Brian, I didn't have a whole lot of fighting to do, but I was certainly willing to fight for the end for that." In the next line, the narrator reassures that they will be with their lover "so long as there are stars above you". Marilyn interpreted the opening lines as autobiographical from Wilson's point of view: "he knew that I was there and I would never leave him, so he knew that he could abuse me, even though he didn't try to. I was never number one, I was always two or three. But if I would leave in some kind of a way, he would get totally distraught."

Of the songs on Pet Sounds, "God Only Knows" is the most lyrically ambiguous. Commentators have sometimes attributed a suicidal quality to the protagonist. In the second verse, the narrator declares that "life would go on ... should you ever leave me", but if that outcome were to occur, then "what good would living do me?" The suggested implication is that they would end their life without their lover—an interpretation that Asher said was not intended by himself or Wilson. Among other interpretations, writer James Perone, who referred to the song as "one of the more unusual expressions of love in a 1960s' pop song", believed that there is "a hint that part of [the character's] 'love' may be self-serving and part of a cycle of codependency." Cash Box described the song as a "slow-shufflin' tender, romantic ode about a guy who is so much in love that he doesn't think that he could go on without his gal."

Asher stated that the intended expression of the song's lyrics was "'I'll love you til [sic] the sun burns out, then I'm gone,' ergo 'I'm gonna love you forever.'" Wilson commented that the song was based around "being blind but in being blind, you can see more. You close your eyes; you're able to see a place or something that's happening."

== Composition ==
=== Key ambiguity and motifs ===
It's not really in any one key. It's a strange song. That's just the way it was written. ... It's the only song I've ever written that's not in a definite key, and I've written hundreds of songs.

— Brian Wilson, 2008

"God Only Knows" contains a weak tonal center that is closest to E major and, in other sections, A major. Adding to this, almost all of the chords are inverted. An E major triad with its bass note in the root position is never invoked, and instead, the ^{6}_{4} position is favored. Of the tracks on Pet Sounds, it is the only one that lacks a strongly established primary key center (others employ key ambiguity to a lesser degree), and the only one that modulates its key up a fourth interval (others descend by a third).

In his book about Pet Sounds, Charles Granata writes that some of the musical devices that "God Only Knows" employs are usually "rather ordinary" by themselves. (Note: Some also appear in Wilson's earlier songs. For example, "California Girls" avoids a root-position tonic and suppresses a cadential drive, while "Kiss Me, Baby" featured complicated vocal layering.) However, in this case, they were executed in a manner that was "far more sophisticated than anything the Beach Boys—or any other modern pop vocal group—had done before." According to musicologist James Garratt, the "tonal plasticity" made the song innovative not just in pop music, but also for the Baroque style it is emulating. He credits the sense of "expansiveness" evoked by the piece to this quality, emphasized by the disuse of authentic cadences and root-position tonics. Lambert states that "a clear sense of key" eludes the listener "for the entire experience—that in fact, the idea of 'key' has itself been challenged and subverted".

The song contains a recurring melodic motif that is reinforced by the lead vocal and the line played on French horn. Musician Andy Gill identified the verse and chorus melodies as variations on the same line, and added that this type of melodic variation was "very" similar to the technique as it is used in classical pieces such as Delibes' Lakmé. To Lambert, the song's use of vocal counterpoints evoked the sacred traditions of a cantata by Bach or an oratorio by Handel. He likened the use of sustained strings to those employed by Wilson on the Pet Sounds tracks "Don't Talk (Put Your Head on My Shoulder)" and "I'm Waiting for the Day".

While some commentators have characterized Pet Sounds as a baroque pop album, musicologist John Howland argues that "God Only Knows" is the album's only track that can be described as such. "Baroque pop" was not used in reviews or critical discussions on Pet Sounds until rock critics in the 1990s began adopting the phrase in reference to artists that the album had influenced. Howland commented that some "classicistic gestures" are present in the orchestration for "God Only Knows", however, listeners must keep in mind that "orchestral instruments do not always signify baroque/classicistic textures".

=== Intro, verse, and refrain ===
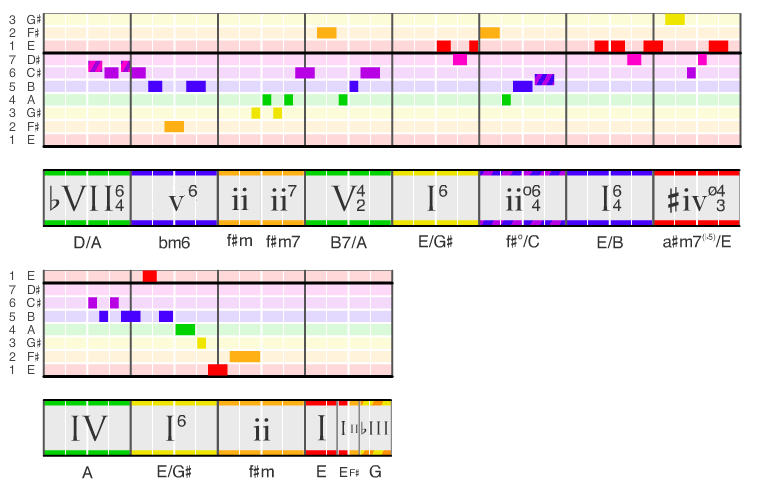
A visual representation of the chord progression and melodic structure for the verse (top) and refrain (bottom)

"God Only Knows" starts with an A major chord accompanied by the sounds of accordions, harpsichord, and French horn, which are soon joined by bass, tambourine, and sleigh bells. At this point, the listener may hear the song as being in the key of A, although part of the line played on French horn includes a note (D♯) outside of that key. According to Lambert, "The ear wants to hear the music in the key of A, and is just starting to feel that it's okay to dismiss the horn note [until the proceeding verse section]."

The verses begin with a D^{6}_{4} chord, weakening the impression of an A key center, and is followed by a B minor6 chord, which does not strongly suggest the dominant (v) chord of E. As the verse develops, it gravitates closer to the key of E on the lines "you never need to doubt it / I'll make you so sure about it" before entering the hook line, "God only knows what I'd be without you", which begins with a return to an A major chord on the "God only" portion. The verse and refrain then repeats, this time with the addition of a string ensemble, before entering the next section of the composition.

Music theorist Daniel Harrison describes the progression as "highly chromatic" and writes, "in the absence of a strong E tonic, A major seems to fill the vacuum at the tonal center, since it is the chord that begins the refrain, and since it receives a strong tonic charge upon the resolution of the chord preceding the refrain. In addition, the opening chords of the verse, while nondiatonic to the nominative E major tonic, are diatonic to A." Lambert writes that the end of the refrain "recall[s] the chord progression of the introduction but ... with an even slighter sense of tonal security." In a 2011 interview, Wilson commented that the melody of "I may not always love you" resembled the "I hear the sound of music" line from "The Sound of Music".

=== Break and coda ===
Instrumental break and modulated verse
Excerpt of the sections that follow the second chorus, demonstrating the modulation from E to A major.

Like many of Wilson's compositions, "God Only Knows" subverted the then-standard 32-bar A-A-B-A pop song format. Following the second refrain, it segues into an instrumental linking passage, described by Dillon as an "avant-garde and unusually jarring transition for a tender love song". Lambert characterizes the passage as "a whirlwind of chord relations ... based on wedging-together instrumental lines".

The song proceeds to repeat the progression of the verse and refrain, however, transposed up by a fourth and with the addition of new vocals. Multiple vocal parts are sung in counterpoint, a technique that is distinguished from the "oos" and "ahhs" style of vocals for which the Beach Boys are known. Lambert identifies this section as a "choral fantasy" of wordless voices that "climax[es] on a dramatic diminished chord". Music teacher Richard Battista, referring to this climax as a "sigh" from the singers, said that it is "totally unique in pop music. He didn't borrow that from the Four Freshmen, or the Everly Brothers, or the Coasters. That sigh is pure Brian Wilson." It concludes once again with the hook line, after which there is a repetition of the second verse.

According to Harrison, "The competition between E and A for tonic control is made clear during the break between verse 2 and the recapitulation of verse 1 lyrics. ... the allusion to the harmonic structure of the verse is made subtle both by the transposition and by different melodic activity. Only when the music of the now A-major refrain is encountered do the voices return to their familiar words." (Note: He declared, "There is no moment in rock music more harmonically and formally subtle than this transition. It is the apex of Brian Wilson's first period of formal experimentation.") Garratt writes, "While the idea of presenting the verse harmonies in the subdominant in the bridge was not new, what is striking here is the smoothness with which the song drops back into the original key – a moment rendered even more arresting by the truncated three-measure phrase that precedes it." Fusilli remarked that Wilson nearly "wr[ote] himself into a dead end", elaborating that "when the song returns to D Major, it must do so from B minor, which is kind of a static change, particularly when the next chord is a B minor with only a slight variation in the bass."

The song ends with a final coda that features repeating vocal rounds—a centuries-old technique that was highly unusual for pop music of the era— with triplet fills played on a drum kit. Wilson's 2016 memoir states, "I liked all those old songs that used rounds, like 'Row, Row, Row Your Boat' ... and 'Frère Jacques' ... I liked rounds because they made it seem like a song was something eternal." At its conclusion, Lambert writes, "we hear A major chords that want to provide harmonic stability, but as before, the chords and vocal lines surrounding them make us want to think otherwise."

== Recording ==
=== Backing track ===
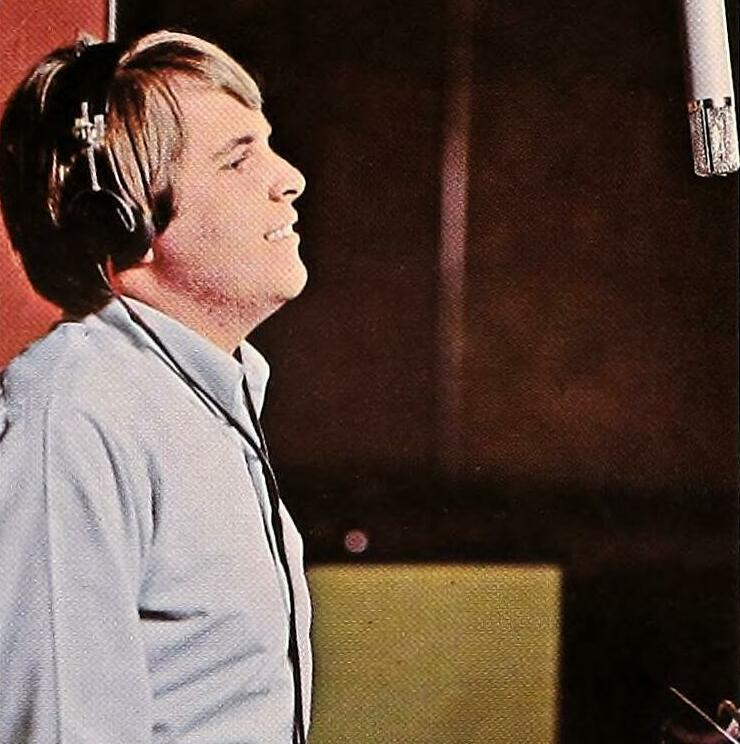
Carl Wilson (pictured 1966) sang the lead vocal.

Following several months of recording for the Pet Sounds album, instrumental tracking for "God Only Knows" began at 12:30 a.m. on March 10, 1966, at the Studio 3 room of Western Studios, Hollywood, making it one of the last tracks to begin recording. The studio space was relatively small for the 20-some musicians that were hired for the session. Carl joined them on this occasion, playing 12-string electric guitar. As usual, Brian produced the session with engineer Chuck Britz.

Among the distinguishing features of the arrangement is an echo-laden "clip-clop" percussion part, sleigh bells played on every other beat, and low-range melodic phrases played on flute during the latter sections of the song. A strip of masking tape was placed over the strings of a piano while the bottoms of two paper orange juice cups were used for percussion. Singer Danny Hutton was present at the session, as he recalled, "[Brian] would hear something wrong, and bam 'One more time.' I just sat there and didn't say a word. I had been in sessions where I thought to myself, they should do this and that. Not this time. I just shut up. What could I add?" Bruce Johnston, who joined the band a year earlier, later said that he "didn't realize just how great" Pet Sounds was going to be until he witnessed this session.

A total of 22 takes were attempted for the song. The musicians struggled to play the instrumental break to Wilson's satisfaction. To address this issue, pianist Don Randi suggested to Wilson that they play the parts in staccato, rather than in full quarter notes. Wilson enjoyed the effect and incorporated the change. A string section was subsequently overdubbed onto take 20, marked as "best". The session ended at 4:30 a.m. The three-track recording of the instrumental was bounced to one channel of an eight-track tape to allow room for further overdubs.

=== Vocals ===
The first round of vocal overdubs were recorded later that day at Columbia Studios. (Note: A session in which the band also worked on "I'm Waiting for the Day", "Wouldn't It Be Nice", and "I Just Wasn't Made for These Times".) Brian sang the lead vocal at this juncture, after which he mixed rough edits of the song on March 13 and 22. These early mixes featured a discarded saxophone solo in its bridge and a different, a capella ending. (Note: Granata surmised that the solo was based on the Four Seasons' music.) The ending was a fuller arrangement that included the voices of Marilyn, her sister Diane, and Byrds producer Terry Melcher. In Carl's recollection, "[E]verybody got in on it. It was like 'Come on out here into the studio.' Brian would make up a little part. That was fun; we listened to it endlessly."

I gave the song to Carl because I was looking for a tenderness and a sweetness which I knew Carl had in himself as well as in his voice. He brought dignity to the song and the words, through him, became not a lyric, but real words.

— Brian Wilson, August 1966

On April 11, the band returned to Columbia to add further (and ultimately final) vocal overdubs. This time, Carl took on the lead. Dillon suggested that Brian may have changed his mind on the lead partly to address concerns over the large percentage of singing roles he was granting himself for the album. According to Carl, Brian later told him that "God Only Knows" was written for his voice: "He says it fits my beautiful spirit. I know I shouldn't be embarrassed by a compliment but ..." Carl quoted the performance instructions he received from his brother: "Don't do anything with it. Just sing it real straight. No effort. Take a breath. Let it go easy." He had rarely sung lead on prior Beach Boys songs.

The coda was ultimately scaled down to three lines sung by two voices, Brian and Johnston. One of Wilson's lines duplicated the part that had been played on French horn. Johnston recalled, "at the end of the session, Carl was really fried, and he went home. ... there were just [me and Brian]. So in the fade, he's singing two of the three parts. He sang the top and the bottom part and I sang in the middle." Of Wilson's decision to pare down the vocals, "It works because it caused a perfect vocal-to-track balance, and it's not too top-heavy. It's brilliant—a fine example of 'less is more.'"

The 1996 stereo mix of the song, created by Mark Linett for The Pet Sounds Sessions box set, does not feature the same singers on the fade-out. Linett explained in the liner notes, "Brian's vocal at the start of the fade of 'God Only Knows' is missing on the multi track having been sung by Carl sometime after the mix Brian used on the original record had been created. The part doesn't exist separate from the track so ... it's not available for the stereo mix."

== Release ==
The Beach Boys (from left: Brian, Al Jardine, Carl) in the promotional film for the song (April 25, 1966)

"God Only Knows" was first released on May 14, 1966, as the opening track of side two on Pet Sounds. In its review of the album, Disc & Music Echo referred to the song as "a standard gem with its hymnal feel." Norman Jopling of Record Mirror decreed that it had "a rollicking salvationist flavour but isn't going to convert anyone." Spencer Davis, frontman of the Spencer Davis Group, praised the song as the album's "most fantastic track" for a contemporaneous survey conducted by Melody Maker. At the suggestion of Johnston, Tony Rivers and the Castaways recorded a version of the song, which was issued about a week before the Beach Boys released their version as a single.

Brian had wanted to issue "God Only Knows" as a solo record by Carl, but according to Carl, "'Good Vibrations', which should have been our next single, didn't turn out the way Brian wanted. We had to have another release and so ['God Only Knows' came out as a Beach Boys single]." On July 18, the song was issued as the B-side of the "Wouldn't It Be Nice" single in the US. Radio programmers ultimately hesitated to add the song to their playlists due to the word "God". Record World reviewed the song as a single, and called it a "very pretty rockaballad with low key chanting by ... the Beach Boys" and "a meaningful love lyric teens will find irresistable." On September 24, it peaked in the Billboard charts separately from the A-side, at number 39. It was ultimately their last B-side to chart there. Later reports suggest that the song was banned from radio in parts of the southern US, a claim that is likely spurious.

In other countries, the sides of the single were reversed, with "God Only Knows" as the A-side. On July 22, it was released as the group's third Pet Sounds single in the UK, debuting at number 30 on the Record Retailer chart. It peaked at number 2 on August 27, behind the Beatles' "Yellow Submarine" / "Eleanor Rigby". In September, "God Only Knows" reached number 4 in Canada's RPM chart and number 24 on France's Music Media Monthly chart. In October, the single peaked at number 11 in the Netherlands and number 6 in Norway. In November, coinciding with the band's first tour of the UK, a God Only Knows EP was issued there. It contained the title track, "Here Today", "Sloop John B", and "Wouldn't It Be Nice".

Responding to the group's growing popularity among the British, a promotional film for the song, directed by band publicist Derek Taylor, was filmed for the UK's Top of the Pops on April 25. The film featured the group (minus Johnston) at Lake Arrowhead, flailing around in grotesque horror masks and playing Old Maid. The clip originally ran for five minutes and incorporated excerpts of "Wouldn't It Be Nice", "Here Today", and "God Only Knows". Due to concerns from the BBC over the horror masks, the clip was later trimmed and re-cut to feature only "God Only Knows". It premiered on BBC1 on August 4, with a repeat airing on September 1.

== Live performances ==
One of the few joys of seeing the Beach Boys in concert ... was to hear Carl sing "God Only Knows." Even after adding a few backing musicians, the group really couldn't replicate Pet Sounds in a live setting with their limited instrumentation. But ... he would offer a sweet, understated "God Only Knows" that would be the musical high point of the program.

— Jim Fusilli, The Beach Boys' Pet Sounds (2005)

The Beach Boys first added the song to their live setlists on July 28, 1966, at a concert in Massachusetts. Reviewing their late 1966 European tour, Melody Maker critic Mike Henessey decreed that the live arrangement "sounded a little thin compared with the recorded [version]." Ray Coleman of Disc & Music Echo mentioned that performances of the song, however, still drew an "expected huge applause".

On August 25, 1967, the band (with Brian and minus Johnston) performed "God Only Knows" at a filmed concert in Honolulu. Footage of them playing the song at this show was later included in the 1984 documentary An American Band. On September 11, 1967, the band recorded another studio version of the song for a discarded, nominal live album known as Lei'd in Hawaii. The recording was released on the 1998 compilation Endless Harmony Soundtrack.

During their 50th-anniversary reunion tour, in 2012, the group played along to a pre-recorded vocal track taken from Carl's 1980 performance of the song at Knebworth. Mike Love said of Carl in a contemporary report, "Nobody ever could or will sing ‘God Only Knows’ as beautifully as he did. It's miserable that he's not there with us. Carl was the real stickler for making the band sound as absolutely perfect as could be. That influence is still felt to this day." The original performance was released on the 2002 live album Good Timin': Live at Knebworth England 1980.

== Recognition and legacy ==
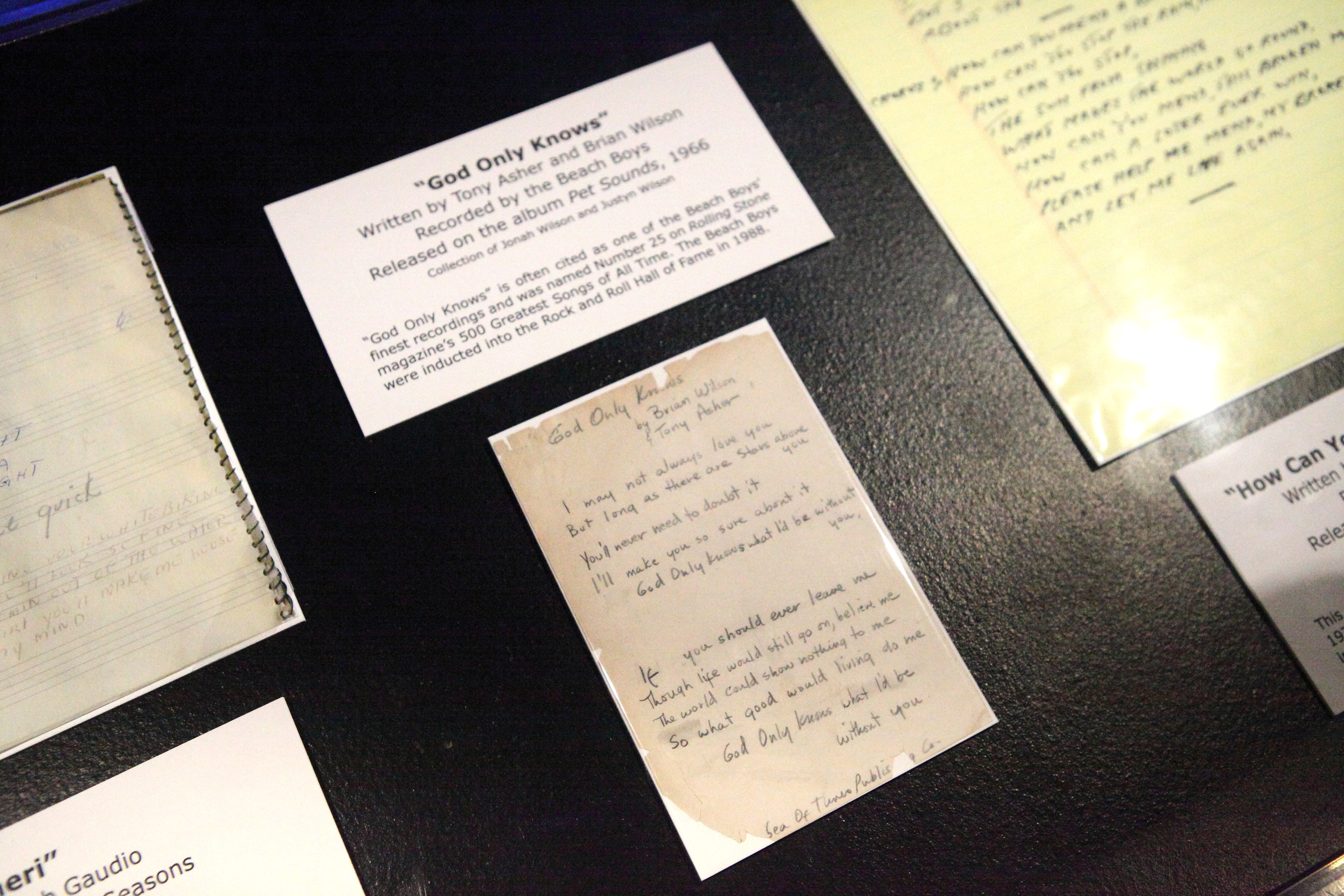
A manuscript of "God Only Knows" displayed in the Rock and Roll Hall of Fame in Cleveland

"God Only Knows" is often praised as the Beach Boys' finest record, as Carl's best vocal performance, as Brian's most quintessential work, and as one of the greatest songs ever written. Writing in his book America in the Sixties (2010), historian John Robert Greene identified the song as "one of the most complex—and beautiful—songs in the annals of American popular music" and credited it with remaking "the ideal of the popular love song. Granata deemed "God Only Knows" a musically and technically impressive accomplishment that Wilson and the Beach Boys never repeated on their subsequent records., and as one of the greatest songs ever written. In 2012, music journalist Dan Caffrey argued that the descriptor "teenage symphony to God", originally reserved for the band's Smile album, was better suited for "God Only Knows". He wrote that the song "has resonated with generations of music fans simply because of its concept", before concluding, "The entire world will listen to it for years to come."

Among Wilson's associates, Asher reflected, "This is the one that I thought would be a hit record, because it was so incredibly beautiful ... I guess that in the end, [it] is the song that most people remember, and love the most." Carl referred to it as "the classic example [of Brian's writing] that takes it to a new plateau". Johnston opined that the song marked Carl's finest vocal performance: "Carl's vocal doubling is excellent—especially when he sings 'O what good would living do me?' He goes up a major third there, and it's just as clean as a whistle." The Wilsons' mother Audree commented, "What can you say about it? I still think it's one of his greatest pieces. I love it. So many times, I have thought how incredible it is that it's my son, my sons who did that." Don Randi remarked of the song, "That one, they should give to every music class, and say 'Here, do this one. Do it a capella.' Give 'em a key note and see what happens. There'll be a lot of suicides."

"God Only Knows" has occasionally appeared in other media. It served as a musical cue in the films Boogie Nights (1997) and Love Actually (2003). Author Thomas Pynchon paid homage to the song by incorporating it into the closing paragraphs of his Wilson-inspired novel Inherent Vice (2009). The 2013 video game BioShock Infinite contains a turn-of-the-century barbershop quartet that sings the song while floating past the player on an airship. The song was also used in the opening credits of the HBO series Big Love.

At the 2026 Drum Corps International World Championships, the Bluecoats Drum and Bugle Corps performed an arrangement of the song as a part of their program, "Gravity and Grace," which took 1st place at Finals.

=== Other songwriters ===
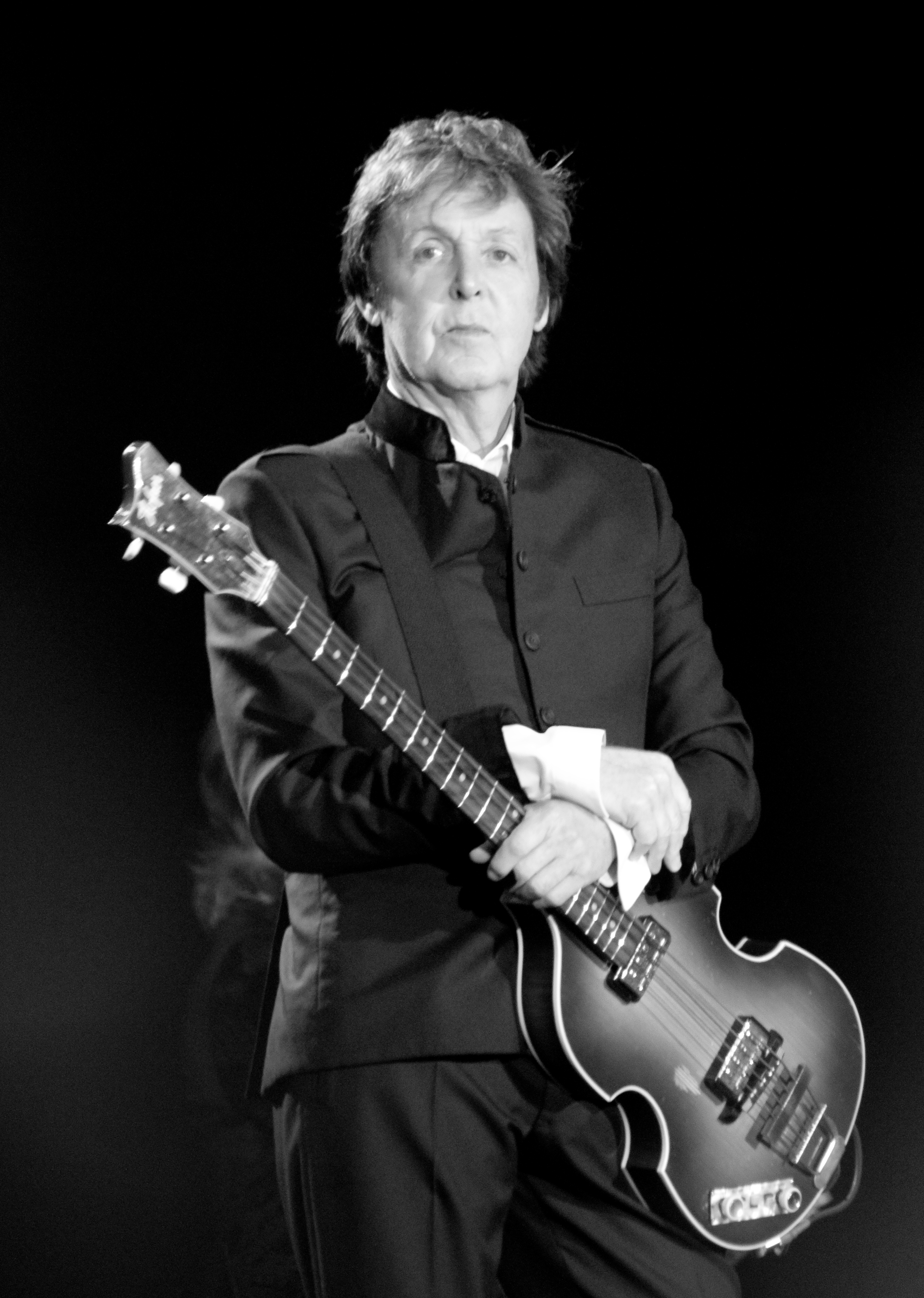
Paul McCartney is one of the frequently cited admirers of the song.

Many songwriters, including Paul McCartney, Jimmy Webb, and Adam Levine, have cited "God Only Knows" as their personal favorite song.

- McCartney described it as "the greatest song ever written". His 1976 song "Silly Love Songs" incorporates a build-up of vocal counterpoints in the same style as "God Only Knows". The song additionally inspired, in part, the Beatles' "Here, There and Everywhere". Wilson felt uncomfortable with the praise and said in 1976 that if McCartney's "greatest song" assertion was true, "[then] what was there left for me to do?" (Note: Journalist Nick Kent quoted Wilson, "Like, if 'God Only Knows' is the greatest song ever written, then I'll never write anything as good again! And if I never write anything as good, then I'm finished. I'm a has-been and a wash-up, just like everyone keeps saying.") In 2002, Wilson and McCartney performed the song as a duet at the Adopt-A-Minefield Benefit Gala in Los Angeles. McCartney later said that he was so overwhelmed by Wilson's presence that he "broke down" during the soundcheck rehearsals.
- Bono remarked that the string arrangement was "fact and proof of angels".
- Barry Gibb said that it "blew the top of my head off ... My first thought was, oh dear, I'm wasting my time, how can I ever compete with that? We've [the Bee Gees] been competing with that ever since."
- Margo Guryan said that the song inspired her to pursue a career in pop music instead of jazz piano. She said, "I freaked [when a friend played me the song]. I thought it was just gorgeous. I bought the record and played it a million times, then sat down and wrote 'Think of Rain'."
- John Lennon, according to Rolling Stone co-founder Jann Wenner, "said he really dug [the song] and the world perked up".
- Pete Townshend said, "'God Only Knows' is simple and elegant and was stunning when it first appeared; it still sounds perfect".
- Webb enjoyed its Baroque influence and felt that it "represents the whole tradition of liturgical music that I feel is a spiritual part of Brian's music. And Carl's singing is pretty much at its pinnacle—as good as it ever got."
- Hans Zimmer cited it as an example of a "perfect song" during an interview with Rick Beato.

=== Accolades and polls ===
- In 2004, it was ranked number 25 in Rolling Stone's list of the "500 Greatest Songs of All Time".
- In 2006, it topped Pitchfork's list of the finest songs of the 1960s. Dominique Leone contributed for its entry, "if you need a tie into the legacy of 1960s youth culture, glance no further than the naïve but strained optimism locked inside this song."
- In 2008, Popdose staff members ranked it the best single of the previous 50 years, writing, "It is simply one of the most beautifully composed and arranged songs in the history of not just pop music, but Western music. To place 'God Only Knows' in its proper context is to [place it with] 1836 Frédéric Chopin."
- In 2011, Paste ranked the song number two on their list of the 20 greatest Beach Boys songs.
- In a 2012 reader's poll conducted by Rolling Stone, it was voted the best Beach Boys song; the editors wrote that it had won "by a significant margin" and added that it was "one of the most heart-melting love songs ever penned ... gorgeous in its form and sentiment".
- In 2012, it topped Consequence of Sound's list of the "100 Greatest Songs of All Time".
- In 2016, it topped Paste's list of "The 100 Best Songs of the 1960s".
- In 2021, it was re-ranked number 11 in Rolling Stone's list of the "500 Greatest Songs of All Time".
- In 2022, The Guardian's Alexis Petridis ranked the song number eight on his list of the 40 greatest Beach Boys songs.
- In June 2026, CBS News included the song in its list of the 250 essential American songs of the past 250 years.

== Cover versions ==
External videos
- God Only Knows (Brian Wilson Tribute) - Lyle Lovett - 2007 Kennedy Center Honors

"God Only Knows" has been covered by a wide variety of artists that includes Andy Williams, Neil Diamond, Olivia Newton-John, Glen Campbell, David Bowie, Toni Tennille, Joss Stone, Mandy Moore, Michael Stipe, Rivers Cuomo, JR JR, Avenged Sevenfold, Taylor Swift, Judie Tzuke, and Wilson Phillips. In 2007, Lyle Lovett performed a rendition of the song during Wilson's Kennedy Center Honor commemoration. Wilson later said it was "the best version I ever heard, including the Beach Boys." In 2025, Sting and Dave Matthews both performed the song at their concerts in Germany and Cincinnati, Ohio, respectively, in tribute to Brian Wilson, shortly after the news of his passing.

=== BBC Music version ===
"God Only Knows"

Single by Brian Wilson and various artists
- Released: October 7, 2014
- Recorded: 2014
- Length: 2:25
- Label: BBC Music
- Songwriters: Brian Wilson; Tony Asher
- Producer: Ethan Johns

Brian Wilson singles chronology
| "The Like in I Love You" (2011) | "God Only Knows" (2014) | "The Right Time" (2015) |

Music video
- "God Only Knows – BBC Music" on YouTube

To commemorate the launch of BBC Music, a cover version of the song was simulcast across BBC television and radio channels on October 7, 2014. It featured an assortment of artists (including Wilson himself) that were collectively credited as the Impossible Orchestra. The music video, directed by François Rousselet, showed the artists in lavish, fantastical computer-generated settings. The track was released the following day as a charity single for Children in Need 2014.

Wilson said: "All of the artists did such a beautiful job ... I can't thank them enough, I'm just honored that 'God Only Knows' was chosen. 'God Only Knows' is a very special song. An extremely spiritual song and one of the best I've ever written." However, the promotion drew much of the same criticisms that were afforded to the BBC's 1997 version of "Perfect Day". (Note: Adam Sherwin wrote in The Independent: "With its message, that the BBC 'owns' the entire musical waterfront and licence-fee payers would do well to remember that, it is the kind of propaganda film an autocratic regime sensing that its legitimacy is crumbling might produce." Writing for The Guardian, Alex Petridis observed "There's clearly something a little self-aggrandising about the BBC getting a raft of stars to sing an unambiguous song of undying devotion apparently to the corporation itself. ... perhaps we should forgive them three minutes of self-congratulation, particularly when it's raising money for charity.")

Accompanied by the BBC Concert Orchestra, each of the following performers are listed in order of appearance, singing vocals unless otherwise specified:

- Martin James Bartlett – celeste
- Pharrell Williams
- Emeli Sandé
- Elton John (the only artist who also performed on the 1997 version of "Perfect Day")
- Lorde
- Chris Martin
- Brian Wilson – vocals, piano
- Florence Welch
- Kylie Minogue
- Stevie Wonder – vocals, harmonica
- Eliza Carthy
- Nicola Benedetti – violin
- Jools Holland – piano
- Brian May – electric guitar
- Jake Bugg
- Katie Derham – violin
- Tees Valley Youth Choir
- Alison Balsom – piccolo trumpet
- One Direction
- Jaz Dhami
- Paloma Faith
- Chrissie Hynde
- Jamie Cullum
- Baaba Maal
- Danielle de Niese
- Dave Grohl
- Sam Smith

Lauren Laverne, Gareth Malone, and Zane Lowe also appear in the video.

== Personnel ==
Per archivists John Brode, Will Crerar, Joshilyn Hoisington and Craig Slowinski.

The Beach Boys

- Carl Wilson – lead and backing vocals
- Bruce Johnston – backing vocals
- Brian Wilson – backing vocals; producer

Session musicians (also known as "the Wrecking Crew")

- Hal Blaine – drums, tambourine, sleigh bells
- Carl Fortina – accordion
- Jim Gordon – waxed paper orange juice cups
- Bill Green – clarinet, bass clarinet
- Leonard Hartman – alto flute, flute
- Jim Horn – alto flute, flute
- Carol Kaye – twelve-string Guild electric guitar
- Larry Knechtel – harpsichord
- Jay Migliori – clarinet
- Frank Marocco – accordion
- Ray Pohlman – Fender VI electric bass guitar with tic-tac effect
- Don Randi – Steinway grand piano with taped strings
- Alan Robinson – French horn
- Lyle Ritz – upright bass

The Sid Sharp Strings

- Jesse Ehrlich – cello
- Leonard Malarsky – violin
- Sid Sharp – violin
- Darrel Terwilliger – viola

Technical staff

- Chuck Britz – engineer (Western instrumental session)
- Bill Brittan – console/recording engineer (Columbia vocal sessions)
- Ralph Valentin – engineer (Columbia vocal session)
- Pete Romano – recording engineer (Columbia vocal session)

== Charts ==
The Beach Boys version
| Chart (1966) | Peak position |
|---|---|
| Canada RPM Top Singles | 4 |
| Finland (Soumen Virallinen) | 39 |
| France (Music Media Monthly) | 24 |
| Ireland (Irish Singles Chart) | 6 |
| Netherlands | 4 |
| Norway (VG-lista) | 6 |
| UK Melody Maker | 2 |
| UK Record Retailer | 2 |
| US Billboard Top 40 | 39 |
| US Cash Box Top 100 | 38 |

| Chart (2016) | Peak position |
|---|---|
| UK Vinyl Singles Chart (OCC) | 1 |

| Chart (2025) | Peak position |
|---|---|
| Japan Hot Overseas (Billboard Japan) | 13 |
| US Hot Rock & Alternative Songs (Billboard) | 21 |

The Vogues version
| Chart (1970) | Peak position |
|---|---|
| Canada RPM AC | 19 |
| US Billboard Bubbling Under the Hot 100 | 101 |
| US Billboard Easy Listening | 21 |

Marilyn Scott version
| Chart (1977–1978) | Peak position |
|---|---|
| US Billboard Hot 100 | 61 |

The Nylons version
| Chart (1996) | Peak position |
|---|---|
| Canada RPM AC | 40 |
| Canada RPM Top 100 | 83 |

BBC Music version
| Chart (2014) | Peak position |
|---|---|
| Ireland (IRMA) | 77 |
| Israel International Airplay (Media Forest) | 10 |
| Scottish Singles Sales (Official Charts) | 18 |
| UK Singles (Official Charts) | 20 |

== Certifications ==
The Beach Boys version
| Region | Certification | Certified units/sales |
|---|---|---|
| New Zealand (RMNZ) | Platinum | 30,000^{‡} |
| United Kingdom (BPI) | Platinum | 600,000^{‡} |
| United States (RIAA) | 2× Platinum | 2,000,000^{‡} |
^{‡} Sales+streaming figures based on certification alone.

== Bibliography ==
- Badman, Keith (2004). The Beach Boys: The Definitive Diary of America's Greatest Band, on Stage and in the Studio. Backbeat Books. ISBN 978-0-87930-818-6.
- Boone, Steve; Moss, Tony (2014). Hotter Than a Match Head: My Life on the Run with The Lovin' Spoonful. Toronto: ECW Press. ISBN 978-1-77041-193-7 – via the Internet Archive.
- Dillon, Mark (2012). Fifty Sides of the Beach Boys: The Songs That Tell Their Story. ECW Press. ISBN 978-1-77041-071-8.
- Everett, Walter (1999). The Beatles as Musicians: Revolver through the Anthology. New York City: Oxford University Press. ISBN 978-0-19-512941-0.
- Fusilli, Jim (2005). Beach Boys' Pet Sounds. Bloomsbury Publishing. ISBN 978-1-4411-1266-8. Archived from the original on January 7, 2016.
- Garratt, James (2014). "Values and Judgments". In Downes, Stephen (ed.). Aesthetics of Music: Musicological Perspectives. Routledge. ISBN 978-1-136-48691-3. Archived from the original on May 1, 2016.
- Granata, Charles L. (2003). Wouldn't it Be Nice: Brian Wilson and the Making of the Beach Boys' Pet Sounds. Chicago Review Press. ISBN 978-1-55652-507-0.
- Greene, John Robert (2010). America in the Sixties. Syracuse University Press. ISBN 978-0-8156-5133-8. Archived from the original on May 13, 2016.
- Harrison, Daniel (1997). "After Sundown: The Beach Boys' Experimental Music" (PDF). In Covach, John; Boone, Graeme M. (eds.). Understanding Rock: Essays in Musical Analysis. Oxford University Press. pp. 33–57. ISBN 978-0-19-988012-6. Archived (PDF) from the original on May 24, 2015.
- Howland, John (2021). Hearing Luxe Pop: Glorification, Glamour, and the Middlebrow in American Popular Music. University of California Press. ISBN 978-0-520-30010-1. Archived from the original on June 28, 2021.
- Kent, Nick (2009). "The Last Beach Movie Revisited: The Life of Brian Wilson". The Dark Stuff: Selected Writings on Rock Music. Da Capo Press. ISBN 9780786730742. Archived from the original on May 18, 2021.
- Lambert, Philip (2007). Inside the Music of Brian Wilson: The Songs, Sounds, and Influences of the Beach Boys' Founding Genius. Bloomsbury Publishing. ISBN 978-1-4411-0748-0. Archived from the original on November 9, 2020.
- Leaf, David (1978). The Beach Boys and the California Myth. New York: Grosset & Dunlap. ISBN 978-0-448-14626-3.
- Lambert, Philip (March 2008). "Brian Wilson's Pet Sounds". Twentieth-Century Music. 5 (1). Cambridge University Press: 109–133. doi:10.1017/S1478572208000625. S2CID 162871617. Archived from the original on October 2, 2021.
- Perone, James E. (2012). The Album: A Guide to Pop Music's Most Provocative, Influential, and Important Creations [4 volumes]: A Guide to Pop Music's Most Provocative, Influential, and Important Creations. ABC-CLIO. ISBN 978-0-313-37907-9. Archived from the original on May 13, 2016.
- Priore, Domenic (2007). Smile: The Story of Brian Wilson's Lost Masterpiece. London: Bobcat Books. ISBN 978-0-8256-7350-4.
- Rodriguez, Robert (2012). Revolver: How the Beatles Re-Imagined Rock 'n' Roll. Montclair: Backbeat Books. ISBN 978-1-61713-009-0.
- Wilson, Brian; Gold, Todd (1991). Wouldn't It Be Nice: My Own Story. New York: HarperCollins. ISBN 978-0-06018-313-4.
- Wilson, Brian; Greenman, Ben (2016). I Am Brian Wilson: A Memoir. Coronet. ISBN 978-1-444-78133-5. Archived from the original on July 26, 2020.
- Kirkey, Christopher (2019). "Good Authentic Vibrations: The Beach Boys, California, and Pet Sounds". In Lovell, Jane; Hitchmough, Sam (eds.). Authenticity in North America: Place, Tourism, Heritage, Culture and the Popular Imagination. Taylor & Francis. pp. 41–60. ISBN 978-0-429-80234-8. Archived from the original on December 2, 2020.
- Zollo, Paul (2016). More Songwriters on Songwriting. Hachette Books. ISBN 978-0-306-81799-1. Archived from the original on April 26, 2021.
