= Wouldn't It Be Nice =

1966 single by the Beach Boys

Single by the Beach Boys

from the album Pet Sounds
- B-side: "God Only Knows"
- Released: July 18, 1966
- Recorded: January 22 – April 1966
- Studio: Gold Star and Columbia, Hollywood
- Genre: Rock; power pop; progressive pop
- Length: 2:33
- Label: Capitol
- Songwriters: Brian Wilson; Tony Asher; Mike Love
- Producer: Brian Wilson

The Beach Boys singles chronology
"Sloop John B" (1966)	"Wouldn't It Be Nice" (1966)	"Good Vibrations" (1966)

Music video
- "Wouldn't It Be Nice" on YouTube

Audio sample
- file; help

"Wouldn't It Be Nice" is a song by the American rock band the Beach Boys and the opening track from their 1966 album Pet Sounds. Written by Brian Wilson, Tony Asher, and Mike Love, it is distinguished for its sophisticated Wall of Sound–style arrangement and refined vocal performances, and is regarded among the band's finest songs. With its juxtaposition of joyous-sounding music and melancholic lyrics, it is considered a formative work of power pop, and with respect to musical innovation, progressive pop.

The lyrics describe a young couple who feel empowered by their relationship and fantasize about the romantic freedom they would earn once married to each other. Wilson produced the record between January and April 1966 with his band and 16 studio musicians who variously played drums, timpani, glockenspiel, trumpet, saxophones, accordions, guitars, pianos, and upright bass. The harp-like instrument heard in the introduction is a 12-string mando-guitar plugged directly into the recording console. One section of the song engages in a ritardando, a device that is rarely used in pop music. The band struggled to sing the multiple vocal parts to Wilson's satisfaction, and the song ultimately took longer to record than any other track on the album.

"Wouldn't It Be Nice" was released as a single in July and peaked at number 8 on the Billboard Hot 100. It has occasionally appeared in the soundtracks of films such as the 1989 documentary Roger & Me, where it was used to underscore visuals of economic devastation.

== Background ==
"Wouldn't It Be Nice" is one of the eight songs that Brian Wilson and Tony Asher wrote for the Pet Sounds album. Wilson's since-discredited 1991 memoir suggested that he was inspired to write the song after having sexual fantasies about the Honeys' singer Diane Rovell, his sister-in-law. While discussing the song, Asher supported that Wilson was "definitely infatuated by her" and "this innocent aura that she seemed to possess. Brian was really just so naive." Wilson repeatedly brought up the subject while they composed the songs on Pet Sounds, as Asher remembered, "He'd stop in the middle of writing a song or a conversation or whatever and start going on about Diane, about how innocent, sweet, and beautiful she was. I'd be thinking, 'Huh! Your wife's in the next room, and you're talking about her sister!'"

It was one of only two songs on Pet Sounds in which Asher wrote words to a melody that Wilson had already finalized, the other being "You Still Believe in Me". According to Asher, "Over a period of days, Brian kept saying that he was working on a melody, but he didn't want to play it for me until he had the structure finished. One day, he said, 'It's done.'" Wilson had decided on its subject matter: the "innocence of [...] being too young to get married", a topic that "seemed to be immensely appealing to him". Asher said that, after he had begun writing the lyrics, Wilson started "microanalyzing the individual words" to Asher's annoyance. Following Asher's complaints, Wilson agreed to let Asher take a tape of the song home and write the words alone. Asher then returned with a set of lyrics, which the pair refined. It was a less integrated and collaborative process than the one for the songs they wrote afterward.

Mike Love's co-writing credit was not officially recognized until 1994, when he successfully sued for writing credits on 35 Beach Boys songs, including "Wouldn't It Be Nice". During the proceedings, Love's attorney proposed that, since Love had not been physically present when Asher and Wilson were writing the song, it may have been possible that Wilson consulted Love by telephone during occasional bathroom breaks. Asher later said it was an "absurd" argument. Asked in a 1996 interview to enumerate Love's contributions, Asher responded, "None, whatsoever." However, under oath, he stated that it consisted of the line "good night my baby / sleep tight, my baby" and possible minor vocal arrangement.

== Lyrics ==
I can remember in "Wouldn't It Be Nice" that we'd both had the experience of being too young to have what the rest of the world would call a serious relationship with a girl and yet wanting to be able to have it taken seriously. [...] it was autobiographical from the point of view of both of us. We were writing about what we both knew and had experienced.

— Tony Asher, 1996

The lyrics describe a young couple fantasizing about the romantic freedom they would earn once married, including the benefits of being able to "hold each other close the whole night through" and to "say goodnight and stay together". Asher explained, "It's a song that people who are young and in love can appreciate and respond to, because it revolves around the things they've always wanted to do: live together, sleep together, wake up together—do everything together."

In a 1976 radio interview, Wilson said his intention in writing the song was to express "the need to have the freedom to live with somebody [...] The idea is, the more we talk about it, the more we want it, but let's talk about it anyway. Let's talk it over, let's talk about what we might have if we really got down to it." In 1996, he reflected, "'Wouldn't It Be Nice' was not a real long song, but it's a very 'up' song. It expresses the frustrations of youth, what you can't have, what you really want and you have to wait for it."

Wilson had previously written a song with similar subject matter, "We'll Run Away", on All Summer Long (1964). He had also produced a rendition of the doo-wop standard "I'm So Young" for The Beach Boys Today! (1965). Journalist Nick Kent felt that, although Wilson had captured similar "teen angst dialogue" before: "This time [he] was out to eclipse these previous sonic soap operas, to transform the subject's sappy sentiments with a God-like grace so that the song would become a veritable pocket symphony." Musicologist Phillip Lambert called the themes "a significant twist" on the lyrics of Wilson's past songs, "which fantasized about material possessions [...] feats of physical skill [...] and one-night stands [...] Now the young lovers just want to be monogamous and draw strength and happiness from each other, 'in the kind of world where we belong.'"

According to AllMusic reviewer Jim Esch, "Wouldn't It Be Nice" inaugurates Pet Sounds's pervasive theme of "fragile lovers" who struggle with "self-imposed romantic expectations and personal limitations, while simultaneously trying to maintain faith in one other". Comparing the group's past celebrations of adolescence and teenage romance, journalist Seth Rogovoy felt that Pet Sounds "upends and overturns every Beach Boys cliché, exposing the hollowness at their core". Rogovoy points to "Wouldn't It Be Nice", which "starts right out with a 180-degree turn – 'Wouldn't it be nice if we were older.'"

== Composition ==
"Wouldn't It Be Nice" begins with an eight-beat introduction in the key of A major. Following a single drum hit, the song shifts to the remote flat submediant key of F. Classical composer John Adams called this key change "nothing new in the classical or jazz world, but appearing here in the context of a standard rock-and-roll song, it felt novel and fresh. More than any other songwriter of that era, Brian Wilson understood the value of harmonic surprise."

The verse bass line was inspired by the Ronettes' "Be My Baby" (1963). Asked about the song's bass line, Wilson, explained, "It's just a feel you get. I sort of feel my way through the line. I can't explain how it's done, in terms of words. [The verses are] similar to the Phil Spector–type bass. It's a one-note walking bass that goes [singing with triplet feel:] 'Bom-buh-bum-bah, bom-buh-bum-bah...' It keeps going one scale tone up ['bah'], then down like a walking bass."

The next section modulates down a minor third, to D major, and contains the return of a melodic figure from the intro. (Note: The same key change occurs in "Let's Go Away for Awhile", another Wilson composition from Pet Sounds.) After this section, the song repeats the end of the verse melody, but this time engages in a decrescendo and ritardando, a device that doesn't often appear in pop music, but does in classical music. At the end, the song returns to its original tempo and fades out. Asher commented, "I love the fact that the song has such a nice, bouncy feel to it. When we were writing, I was aware of the intricate rhythms that Brian had accomplished musically. There are changes in tempo and legato parts that make it very interesting."

== Recording ==
Backing track of "Wouldn't It Be Nice"
An excerpt of the backing track.

Vocals of "Wouldn't It Be Nice"
Isolated vocals excerpt, continuing from the same section.

=== Backing track ===
Instrumental tracking for "Wouldn't It Be Nice" began at 7:00 p.m. on January 22, 1966, at Gold Star Studios. Wilson produced the session with engineer Larry Levine. The calliope-like instrument heard in the opening bars is an electric 12-string guitar plugged directly into the recording console. (Note: Some sources mistake this as a harp. It is actually a mando-guitar, a specialized electric 12-string guitar.) Due to recording logistics, this created an unusual situation in which the player had to perform the instrument in the control room, away from the rest of the musicians, who could not hear his playing in the regular recording space. The exception was drummer Hal Blaine, who wore headphones and was tasked with signaling the other musicians to play on cue. All of the instruments were played live in a continuous take, with no overdubs.

Much of the track's rhythmic accompaniment was provided by two accordions playing a shuffle beat in a manner similar to the band's "California Girls" (1965). Wilson recalled, "I had two accordion players playing at once, both playing the same thing and it just rang through the room, in the booth, and everyone was saying, 'What is that sound?'" During the second bridge, the players performed a technique known as a "triple bellow shake" to make the accordions sound like a violin. On "Wouldn't It Be Nice", Wilson used one of his favorite recording techniques, applying reverb exclusively to a timpani. This same technique can be observed on "You Still Believe in Me" and "Don't Talk (Put Your Head on My Shoulder)".

Some of the charts that Wilson handed to his musicians were written in different keys from each other. Session musician Lyle Ritz, who was playing in D, mistook the arrangement as an error, as he recalled: "[The] rest of the band was in another key. I knew that was wrong. So during a break, I looked at everybody else's music to see if it was a mistake. Because you can't do that. But he [Brian] pulled it off." After recording 21 takes of the instrumental track, the session concluded at 11:30 p.m. with a lead vocal overdub by Wilson. Wilson did not use Gold Star for any other song on the album except "I Just Wasn't Made for These Times".

=== Vocals and mixdown ===
The one song that sticks out in my mind the most is "Wouldn't It Be Nice." Brilliant parts. It was hard to sing without getting tears in your eyes. We all seem to remember singing it a lot. Many times. Many days.

— Carl Wilson, 1996

The vocal sessions for Pet Sounds were the most challenging of the group's career, and their performance on "Wouldn't It Be Nice" took longer to record than any other track on the album, as Wilson's bandmates struggled to sing the multiple vocal parts to his satisfaction. Al Jardine later said that the challenge of meeting Wilson's standards on the song "was painful beyond belief for all of us." Carl Wilson remembered, "We really tried to make a good album. We wanted to take another step. 'Wouldn't It Be Nice' was the track that really brought that hope to all of us. We did at least ten sessions on that one, and it still wasn't right. I still think we sang it a little rushed."

Mike Love, who affectionately nicknamed Brian "the Stalin of the studio" during these sessions, said, "We did one passage of 'Wouldn't It Be Nice' close to 30 times—and some of the tries were nearly perfect! But Brian was looking for something more than the actual notes or the blend: he was reaching for something mystical—out of the range of hearing." Bruce Johnston similarly likened Wilson to General Patton. In his recollection, "We re-recorded our vocals for 'Wouldn't It Be Nice' so many times that the rhythm was never right. We'd slave [...] singing this thing and then Brian would say, 'No it's not right! It's just not right!'" According to Johnston, Wilson had been dissatisfied with the Beach Boys' vocal performances on the prior hit "California Girls" and was aiming for a "perfect" vocal sound for "Wouldn't It Be Nice".

On February 16, Wilson created a rough mono mix of the song at United Western Recorders. Another mono mix with different, incomplete vocals was made on March 3, using the eight-track console at Columbia Studio. Further vocal overdubs were taped on March 10, followed by more rough mixes on March 22. The final round of vocal overdubs were recorded at Columbia on April 11 and shortly thereafter. According to Brian, "One of the features of this record is that Dennis sings [his harmony parts] in a special way, cupping his hands. I had thought for hours of the best way to achieve the sound and Dennis dug the idea because he knew it would work." Love developed the "good night my baby / sleep tight, my baby" couplet during the studio sessions.

Like other tracks on the album, "Wouldn't It Be Nice" contains a prominent technical flaw in the final mix, in which an audible tape splice is heard between the chorus and Love's vocal entrance in the bridge. The error was mended on the track's 1996 stereo mix created by Mark Linett for The Pet Sounds Sessions. Linett explained, "The abrupt edit [...] was an edit that took an older mix with Mike Love singing and put it in the bridge. I didn't figure that out for years!" The 1996 stereo mix features Wilson singing the bridge because the tape with Love's singing was not available.

== Commercial performance ==
"Wouldn't It Be Nice" was first released on May 14, 1966, as the opening track on Pet Sounds. On July 18, the song was issued in the U.S. with the B-side "God Only Knows" as the third single from Pet Sounds. In other countries such as the United Kingdom, "Wouldn't It Be Nice" was issued as the B-side of "God Only Knows".

The single debuted on the U.S. Billboard Hot 100 at number 84 on July 30, and it peaked at number 8 on September 17. Also in September, it peaked at number four in Canada and number two in Australia. In October, it peaked at number 12 in New Zealand.

== Critical reception ==
In his self-described "unbiased" review of the album for Record Mirror, published in July 1966 upon Pet Sounds's British release, Norman Jopling said that the song "starts off prettily, and develops into a complicated ponderous beat number taken at a reasonably fast tempo. It slows down half-way through but brightens up again, and the lyric is pleasant. But not exceptional Beach Boys." Billboard's review highlighted the track for its "strong single potential". Cash Box described the song as a "rhythmic, medium-paced, danceable sincere pledge of devotion".

Writing in his 2012 book Fifty Sides of the Beach Boys, biographer Mark Dillon describes "Wouldn't It Be Nice" as perhaps the band's "most gloriously innocent song" and one of Wilson's "most adventurous" arrangements. Nick Kent declared the harmonies to be "so complex they seemed to have more in common with a Catholic Mass than any cocktail lounge acappella doo-wop". Writing for American Songwriter magazine, Jason Scott noted the song's "whimsy" and "blissful" feeling, highlighting the "harp-like texture" of the guitar intro.

In 2006, Pitchfork ranked it number seven on its list of "The 200 Best Songs of the 1960s". Contributor Joe Tangari wrote in its entry: "'Wouldn't It Be Nice' has everything you love about the Beach Boys in spades [...] It's the ultimate starry-eyed teenage symphony to God, and it perfectly captures the earnest devotion we only seem capable of in a small window of years." In 2008, Popdose staff members ranked it the 22nd-best single of the previous 50 years, writing that "no other song [...] so perfectly captures the idea of innocent love." National Review ranked it number five on a 2006 list of the greatest politically conservative rock songs, where it was described as "pro-abstinence and pro-marriage". In 2021, it was ranked number 297 on Rolling Stone's list of "The 500 Greatest Songs of All Time".

== Musical influence ==
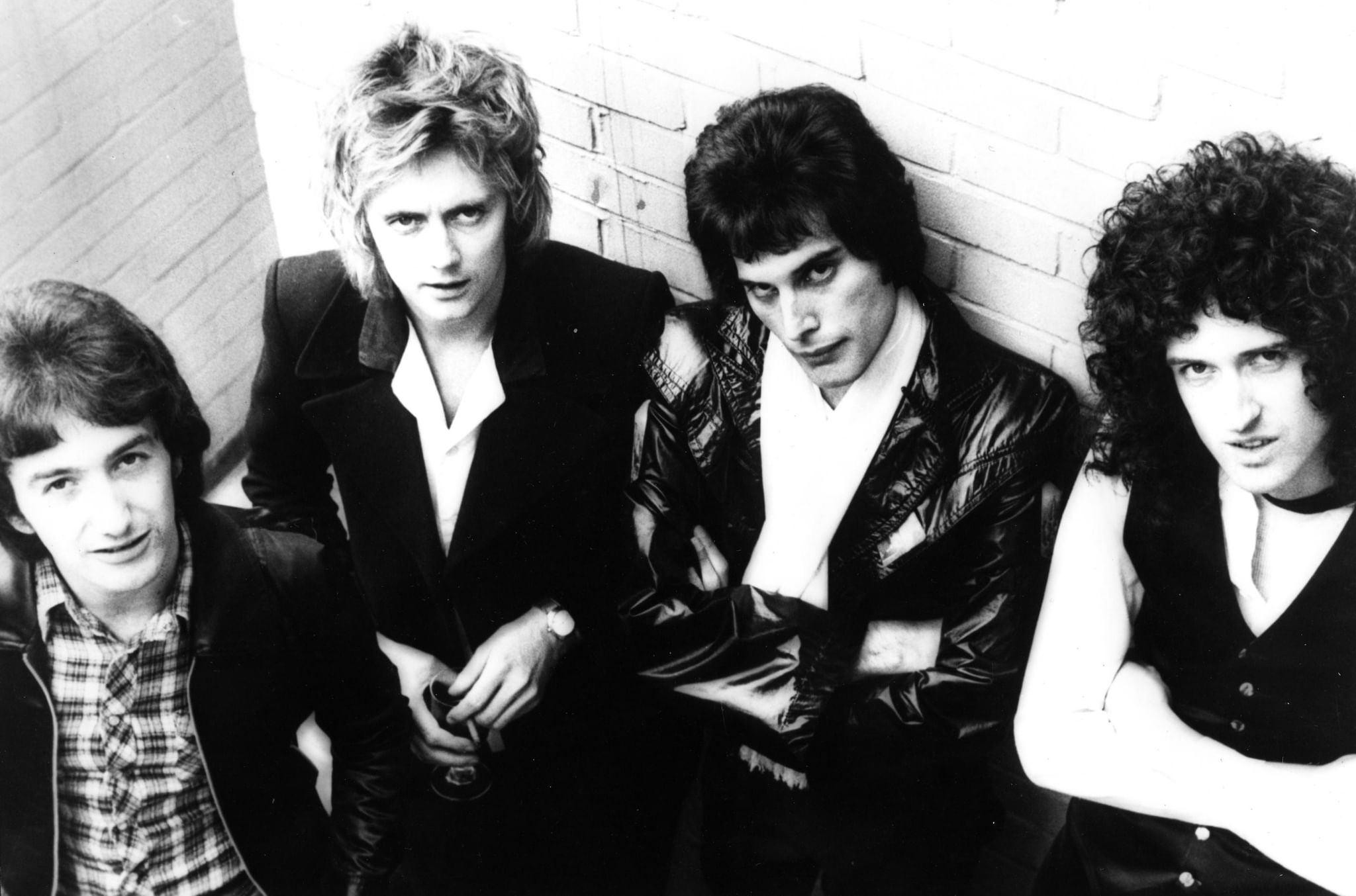
"Wouldn't It Be Nice" anticipated the progressive pop of bands like Queen

"Wouldn't It Be Nice" was pivotal in the formation of the progressive pop genre. Writing for Cleveland, Troy L. Smith said that it was one of the Pet Sounds tracks that solidified the band as the genre's forefathers, characterizing the song as "a Wall of Sound style single that contains some of the best harmonizing in the history of music." He called it "the first taste of progressive pop that would be picked up by the Beatles and the likes of Supertramp, Queen and others moving forward." The Beatles' Paul McCartney praised the melody while noting his fascination at the time with the song's arrangement.

The song was also influential to the development of power pop. Author Michael Chabon named it as a "founding document" of the genre, citing its "sadness and yearning [...] smuggled into the melody, the harmonies, the lyrics, and even the title, which marks the broken place, the gap between the wish and the world."

Among the other artists that have afforded praise to "Wouldn't It Be Nice", Zooey Deschanel performed the song regularly at concerts with her band She & Him and said, "On the surface, it's a really well-crafted pop song, but then it has so many layers: production-wise, songwriting-wise, and lyrically. It's a perfect record." She added that her mind was "blown" by the vocals-only track included on The Pet Sounds Sessions box set. Singer Taylor Swift selected it as the song she would play for walking down the aisle in the event that she would ever get married. A 1977 live rendition by Alex Chilton – in which he jokingly introduces it as "a song by Charlie Manson" – was included on the posthumous release Ocean Club '77 (2015).

== Cultural responses ==
The song has occasionally appeared in the soundtracks of films such as Shampoo (1975), 50 First Dates (2004), and It's Complicated (2009). In the 1989 documentary Roger & Me, it was used to underscore visuals of the economic devastation caused by the closure of several auto plants in Flint, Michigan. Critic Anthony Kaufman highlighted the scene as an especially effective piece of "ironic counterpoint". The band's film-themed compilation Still Cruisin' (1988) included the song for its appearance in The Big Chill (1983), although the compilers accidentally used an alternate mix of the track with a different vocal take.

In 1990, the political cartoon strip Doonesbury ran a controversial story arc involving the character Andy Lippincott and his terminal battle with AIDS. It concludes with Lippincott expressing his admiration for Pet Sounds and, in the last panels, depicts the character's death while listening to "Wouldn't It Be Nice", as well as his last written words, the line "Brian Wilson is God" scrawled on a notebook (a reference to the line "Clapton is God"). According to cultural theorist Kirk Curnett in 2012, the panel "remains one of the most iconic in Doonesbury's forty-three year history, often credit[ed] with helping humanize AIDS victims when both gay and straight sufferers were severely stigmatized". (Note: Comic book artist Ty Templeton said that the song "made me sob like a baby for years because of Andy's relationship to that song. It no longer belongs to Brian Wilson and the Beach Boys [...] It's Andy's.") Curnett also noted that while "[i]t may overstate the case to describe [the song] as a gay anthem", it had been used at recent LGBT rallies. The song is also featured in the 2024 film Sonic the Hedgehog 3 when Ivo Robotnik and his grandfather Gerald get to spend the perfect day in a virtual reality simulation, giving Ivo the childhood he missed out on.

== Live performances ==
External videos
- "Wouldn't It Be Nice" (Live in London)
- "Wouldn't It Be Nice" (The Beach Boys In Concert)

The Beach Boys adopted the song into their live performances, typically with Al Jardine handling the lead vocal originally sung by Wilson. They did not initially incorporate the tempo change into the live arrangement, and instead skipped that section entirely, as can be heard on the 1968 recording released on the live album Live in London (1970). In April 1971, a version recorded live at the 1970 Big Sur Folk Festival was released as a single. By the early 1970s, the group had begun playing the whole song in their live arrangement, as demonstrated on 1973's The Beach Boys in Concert.

== Personnel ==
Per archivists John Brode, Will Crerar, Joshilyn Hoisington and Craig Slowinski.

The Beach Boys

- Al Jardine – backing & harmony vocals
- Bruce Johnston – backing & harmony vocals
- Mike Love – bridge and outro lead vocals, backing & harmony vocals
- Brian Wilson – lead vocals, backing & harmony (falsetto) vocals; producer; bridge lead vocals (stereo mix)
- Carl Wilson – backing & harmony vocals
- Dennis Wilson – backing & harmony (bass) vocals

Session musicians (also known as "the Wrecking Crew")

- Hal Blaine – drums
- Frank Capp – timpani, jingle stick, glockenspiel
- Roy Caton – trumpet
- Jerry Cole – 12-string electric guitar
- Steve Douglas – tenor saxophone
- Carl Fortina – accordion
- Plas Johnson – tenor saxophone
- Carol Kaye – Fender Precision bass guitar
- Barney Kessel – 12-string electric guitar (Danelectro Bellzouki 7010)
- Larry Knechtel – tack piano
- Al De Lory – Steinway grand piano
- Frank Marocco – accordion
- Jay Migliori – baritone saxophone
- Bill Pitman – acoustic rhythm guitar
- Ray Pohlman – Fender VI 6-string bass
- Lyle Ritz – string bass

Technical staff

- Larry Levine – engineer (Gold Star instrumental session)
- Chuck Britz – engineer (Western vocal session)
- Bowen David – assistant engineer (Western vocal session)
- Ralph Valentin – console engineer (Columbia vocal session)
- Bill Brittan – console/recording engineer (Columbia vocal session)
- Pete Romano – recording engineer (Columbia vocal session)

== Charts ==
=== Weekly charts ===
1966 weekly chart performance for "Wouldn't It Be Nice"
Chart (1966)	Peak position
Australia Go-Set National Top 40	2
Canada RPM Top Singles	4
New Zealand Singles Chart	12
US Billboard Hot 100	8
US Cash Box Top 100	7
US Record World	5

1975 weekly chart performance for "Wouldn't It Be Nice"
Chart (1975)	Peak position
US Billboard Bubbling Under the Hot 100	103

1990 weekly chart performance for "Wouldn't It Be Nice"
Chart (1990)	Peak position
UK Singles (OCC)	58

2025 weekly chart performance for "Wouldn't It Be Nice"
Chart (2025)	Peak position
Japan Hot Overseas (Billboard Japan)	14

=== Year-end charts ===
1966 year-end chart performance for "Wouldn't It Be Nice"
Chart (1966)	Rank
US (Joel Whitburn's Pop Annual)	101
US (Billboard Hot 100)	97

== Certifications ==
Certifications for "Wouldn't It Be Nice"
Region	Certification	Certified units/sales
New Zealand (RMNZ)	2× Platinum	60,000^{‡}
United Kingdom (BPI)	Platinum	600,000^{‡}
United States (RIAA)	4× Platinum	4,000,000^{‡}
^{‡} Sales+streaming figures based on certification alone.

== Bibliography ==
- Adams, John (2011). Hallelujah Junction: Composing an American Life. Faber & Faber. ISBN 978-0-571-26089-8.
- Badman, Keith (2004). The Beach Boys: The Definitive Diary of America's Greatest Band, on Stage and in the Studio. Backbeat Books. ISBN 978-0-87930-818-6.
- Carlin, Peter Ames (2006). Catch a Wave: The Rise, Fall, and Redemption of the Beach Boys' Brian Wilson. Rodale. ISBN 978-1-59486-320-2.
- Dillon, Mark (2012). Fifty Sides of the Beach Boys: The Songs That Tell Their Story. ECW Press. ISBN 978-1-77041-071-8.
- Granata, Charles L. (2003). Wouldn't it Be Nice: Brian Wilson and the Making of the Beach Boys' Pet Sounds. Chicago Review Press. ISBN 978-1-55652-507-0.
- Kent, Nick (2009). "The Last Beach Movie Revisited: The Life of Brian Wilson". The Dark Stuff: Selected Writings on Rock Music. Da Capo Press. ISBN 9780786730742.
- Lambert, Philip (2007). Inside the Music of Brian Wilson: The Songs, Sounds, and Influences of the Beach Boys' Founding Genius. Bloomsbury Publishing. ISBN 978-1-4411-0748-0.
- Lambert, Philip, ed. (2016). Good Vibrations: Brian Wilson and the Beach Boys in Critical Perspective. University of Michigan Press. doi:10.3998/mpub.9275965. ISBN 978-0-472-11995-0.
- Love, Mike (2016). Good Vibrations: My Life as a Beach Boy. Penguin Publishing Group. ISBN 978-0-698-40886-9.
