= Don't Talk (Put Your Head on My Shoulder) =

1966 song by the Beach Boys

Song by the Beach Boys

from the album Pet Sounds
- Released: May 16, 1966
- Recorded: February 11 – April 3, 1966
- Studio: Western, Hollywood
- Length: 2:58
- Label: Capitol
- Songwriters: Brian Wilson; Tony Asher
- Producer: Brian Wilson

Licensed audio
- "Don't Talk (Put Your Head on My Shoulder)" on YouTube

"Don't Talk (Put Your Head on My Shoulder)" is a song by the American rock band the Beach Boys from their 1966 album Pet Sounds. Written by Brian Wilson and Tony Asher, it is a ballad about nonverbal communication between lovers. Musically, the song is distinguished for its chromaticism, the use of a string sextet, and its key ambiguity. It is among the most harmonically complex songs that Wilson ever composed.

Wilson sang lead and produced the track in early 1966 with the aid of session musicians who variously played guitars, vibraphone, timpani, organ, piano, upright bass, a ride cymbal, and strings. It is one of three tracks on Pet Sounds where he is the only Beach Boy featured. Acts who have covered the song include Linda Ronstadt, Fennesz, Anne Sofie von Otter with Elvis Costello, and Jeff Beck with Johnny Depp.

== Background and lyrics ==
"Don't Talk (Put Your Head on My Shoulder)" was written by Brian Wilson and Tony Asher about nonverbal communication between lovers. In the lyrics, the narrator observes of his lover, "I can hear so much in your sighs / and I can see so much in your eyes / There are words we both can say / But don't talk, put your head on my shoulder". The narrator is generally celebratory of the time that the couple are spending together, although the line "let's not think about tomorrow" implies that he is also feeling a sense of desperation. According to Asher, "It's strange to sit down and write a song about not talking ... but we managed to do it and it came off well."

I wanted to be a girl in my voice, so I did. I wanted to sing like a girl. Not consciously, but it was all figured out in my brain, waiting for me to do it. So I went in there, put some beautiful music on tape ...

— Brian Wilson, speaking about the impetus for "Don't Talk"

Wilson thought that "Don't Talk" had an overall mood similar to his 1963 song "Lonely Sea", explaining, "It's a different setting, but the emotion is the same." His then-wife Marilyn opined that the lyrics demonstrated Wilson at his most "romantic", and that "[o]ther people would have thought [the message] was sissyish, but he was very romantic, and that was just coming from two people just being close." In reference to the line "Listen to my heartbeat", Brian reflected, "I felt very deeply about that line. One of the sweetest songs I ever sang. I have to say I'm proud of it. The innocence of youth in my voice, of being young and childlike. I think that's what people liked."

Music journalist Geoffrey Himes describes the song as a "ballad that featured Brian singing in a devotional high tenor about the romantic moment when words fail." Biographer Timothy White suggests that the lyrics can be interpreted as both "a peaceful meditation on romantic tranquility" and "a song of reunion for any loved ones." Conversely, author Jim Fusilli felt that the lyrics suggest "the way you express your love for someone who is ready to go ... it's what you say when you know it's the last time you'll hold her in your arms."

== Composition ==
=== Harmonic structure ===
"Don't Talk" is among the most harmonically complex songs that Wilson ever composed. (Note: Lambert estimates that the closest precedents for this song in Wilson's catalog include "Guess I'm Dumb" and "In the Back of My Mind", however, those examples fail to "approach the sophistication and chromaticism of 'Don't Talk.'") The key is ambiguous and unstable, making identifying it difficult. Although it most closely suggests G♭ major, the only G♭ chord in the song appears in second inversion, with a fifth in the root, furthering the tonal instability.

The song is an AABA style ballad written in 12/8 metre. This metre is implied solely by the melody, as the only rhythmic and percussive feature is a ride cymbal being tapped with a brush. In White's description, the cymbal is struck "with clocklike rhythm"; the instrumentation, coupled with Wilson's "unrestrained" vocal, "invoked the milieu of a requiem". A half-diminished chord (PØ7) appears on the line "I can see so much in your eyes", adding a sense of drama to the mood. (Note: This chord reappears in two other Pet Sounds tracks: "God Only Knows" and "Let's Go Away for Awhile".)

Musicologist Philip Lambert identifies a stepwise motif in the call-and-response melodies – one which ascends before the other descends – heard on the line "there are words we both could say". The resultant "arch figure" is then echoed by the instruments on every two bars. In his analysis, Lambert writes,

The importance of the motive [sic] grows as the song progresses, as it continues to reiterate its non-verbal message; and then, near then end, after the singer asks us simply to ‘listen’ and then fades into silence, the motive is woven throughout an affecting string meditation. As a symbol of the lovers' inexpressible passion, it is what we have been invited to hear. But the motive not only echoes the vocal line of this song, it also relates to other songs on the album, becoming a thread helping to bind the cycle together. To hear this, we need only expand the motive to include not simply the stepwise ascent but also the overall arch shape that results when it begins to step back down.

=== Arrangement ===
In his 2003 book about Pet Sounds, Charles Granata writes that "Don't Talk" is the track on the album that best demonstrates Wilson's "exquisite use" of word painting, such as on the line "Listen to my heart beat", in which the Fender bass line evokes the sounds of a beating heart. In other parts of the song, timpani attacks further accentuate this effect. Himes supports, "When Brian sang in an intimate hush, 'Don't talk; take my hand and listen to my heartbeat. Listen! Listen! Listen!' the music demanded that you listen just as closely to its throbbing pulse." (Note: Asked in 1996 if this had been Wilson's conscious intention for the piece, Asher responded that he could not remember, although he was "quite sure that line-- that lyric line was Brian's line, and very well he may have had that in his head when he was writing it".) Moreover, he writes, "A string [sextet] played the minor seventh chords at close intervals, while the tympani boomed and a fat-toned electric bass drifted from the expected root note to create harmonic tensions within the lush sound."

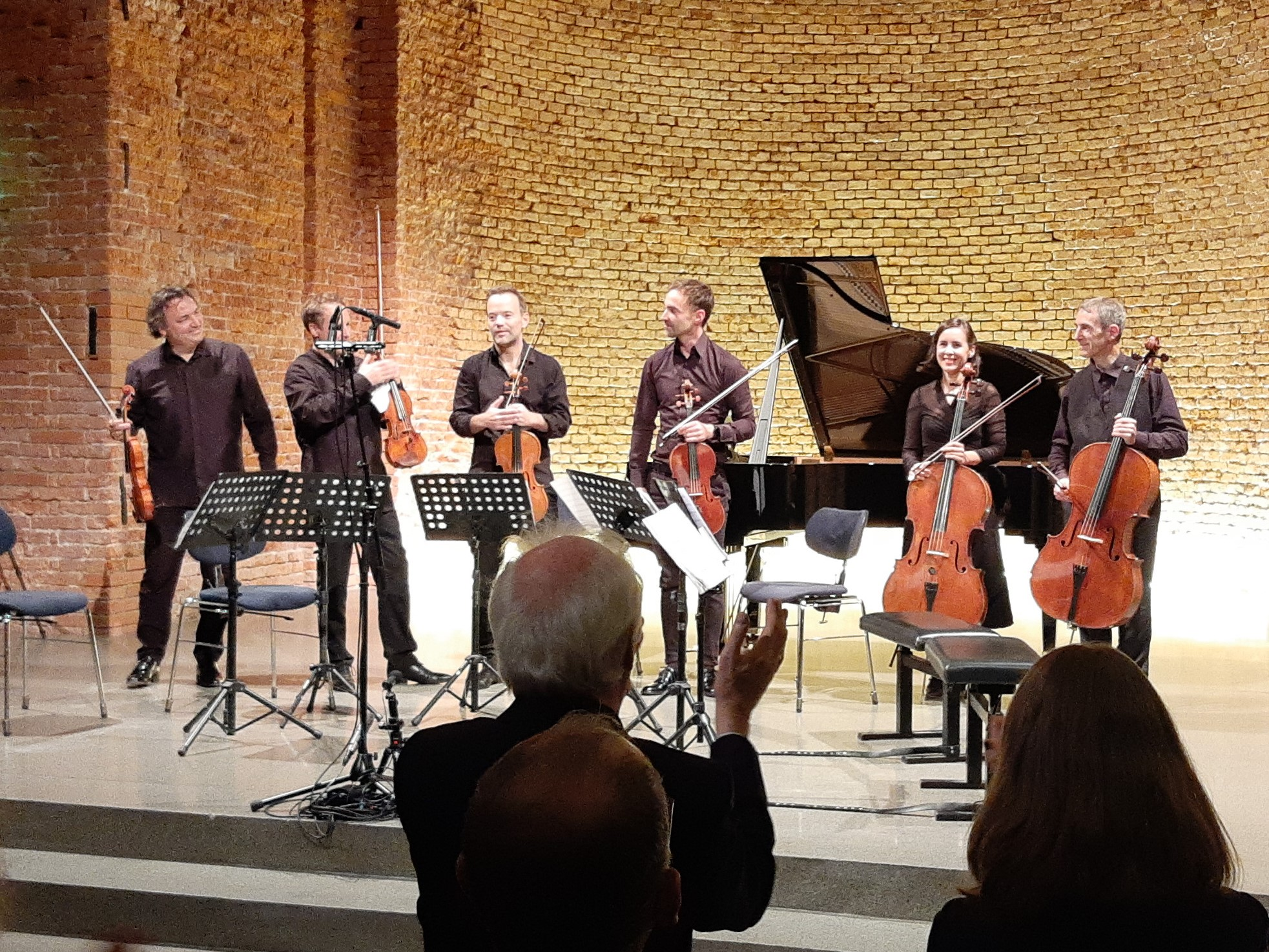
The dark quality of "Don't Talk" is attributed to the lower-register of the violin, viola, and cello.

Prior to "Don't Talk", Wilson had rarely used string sections in his work. In this song, he augmented the basic track with an overdubbed string sextet (four violins, one viola, and a cello) in pursuit of a "dark, expressive" effect that Granata compares to "the sound favored by Johannes Brahms". Record producer Phil Ramone said of this song, "Though [Brian] might not have studied Brahms or Ravel, he heard them in his head. That is evident in these chords, and the way they were voiced. It was unusual for pop music at that time." Violinist Nancy Ciminnisi commented,

The string voicings on "Don't Talk" are close, and he uses passing tones within diminished chords. When combined with the close harmonies in the lower register, this yields a rich, somber tone that meaningfully portrays the mood of the music. On this piece, Brian uses more violins, but the single viola takes the melodic lead. The low register instruments have the moving melodic line, while the violins sustains. He obviously wanted a certain texture and tone color, and the viola and cello brought it out."

== Recording ==
Wilson's piano demo
Excerpt of Wilson performing the basic chord patterns of "Don't Talk", albeit slightly different from the final recording.

Wilson recorded a piano demo of "Don't Talk" in late 1965. Lambert identified several differences between the final composition; the piano rendition is "faster, more rhythmic, less contemplative [and] has some additional bars between phrases ... different chord changes, in spots, and includes only the verses, with no hint of the 'listen' section at the end." He also noted similarities with the opening of Jan and Dean's 1964 hit "Dead Man's Curve", a song that Wilson had co-authored. The tape of Wilson's demo was lost and later rediscovered in the 1990s; it was then included on the 1997 box set The Pet Sounds Sessions.

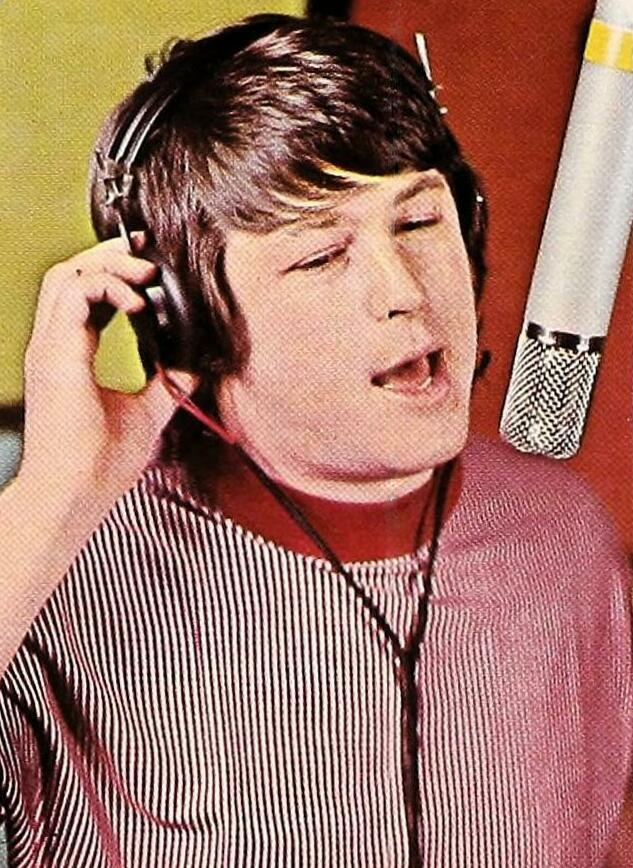
Unlike most of the other tracks on Pet Sounds, Wilson sang lead without the accompaniment of backing harmonies

Weeks after he had begun writing with Asher, on February 11, 1966, Wilson recorded the basic track and vocal at Western Studios with assistance from eight session musicians, including drummer Hal Blaine, guitarists Glen Campbell and Billy Strange, percussionist Frank Capp, pianist Steve Douglas, and bassists Carol Kaye and Lyle Ritz.

During the middle of March, while the rest of the Beach Boys were embarked on a short tour, Wilson recorded a number of vocal experiments on 8 track tape at Columbia Studio. These included a handful of comedy skits and a rendition of the nursery rhyme "Row Row Row Your Boat" sung by his wife Marilyn and her two sisters. At the end of the session, Wilson alone recorded a four-part double tracked acapella arrangement of the "Don't Talk" verse progression. Though mixed to mono by engineer Ralph Valentin, this recording would not see the light of day until it was included as a bonus track on the first Pet Sounds CD release in 1988.

The song lay dormant for almost two months after the initial tracking sessions. It was not until April 3 when Wilson bounced the backing track down in order to add both his vocal overdubs and a string sextet. It is one of two tracks on Pet Sounds where Wilson's lead vocal is not augmented with backing vocals, the other being "Caroline, No", and one of three tracks where he is the only Beach Boy performing. (Note: The other two tracks are "Pet Sounds" and "Caroline, No".)

"Don't Talk" is the only track from Pet Sounds for which no other recordings from the tracking session could be found in 1996, thus, a "session highlights" excerpt could not be included on The Pet Sounds Sessions.

== Critical reception ==
On May 16, 1966, "Don't Talk" was released as the fourth track on Pet Sounds. In his self-described "unbiased" review of the album for Record Mirror, Norman Jopling described the song as having a "hymnal sound ... with a tremendous atmosphere ... of late night, very tired sitting on the rug at your girl's place." Reviewing the song for AllMusic, Jim Esch praised "Don't Talk" as among "Brian Wilson's lushest romantic compositions" and "a hymn to love's tactile sensibility -- a gorgeous love song by any standard, and a triumph of Wilson's mature arranging powers."

Asher remembered that he was "literally speechless" when he heard the completed track. He reflected, "I always thought this song was one hell of an example of Brian's musical sophistication ... I never realized that Brian had that kind of talent for serious arranging before I heard this recording." Bruce Johnston said, "I think I was in awe of the string arrangement, how so few strings could do so much. He had very small, 'baby' orchestras. He made everything sound like you could set it up in your living room and stand in the middle. And maybe add some echo later. He absolutely under-produced his sweetening."

== Influence ==
Musician Elvis Costello commented, "I heard 'Don't Talk (Put Your Head on My Shoulder)' played on the cello. It sounded beautiful and sad, just as it does on Pet Sounds. So now you know, if all the record players in the world get broken tomorrow, these songs could be heard a hundred years from now."

Cibo Matto's Yuka Honda commented, "Brian Wilson’s chord progressions tell the most heartbreaking yet beautiful and silently intense story of the duality of life, all from a place of hope. The six bar intro of 'Don’t Talk (Put Your Head on My Shoulder)' is worth a thousand books. I consider it to be one of the greatest chord changes ever written."

== Personnel ==
Per archivists John Brode, Will Crerar, Joshilyn Hoisington and Craig Slowinski.

The Beach Boys

- Brian Wilson – vocal; producer

Session musicians (also known as "the Wrecking Crew")

- Hal Blaine – ride cymbal
- Glen Campbell – 12-string Mosrite Mark XII electric guitar
- Frank Capp – vibraphone, timpani
- Al De Lory – Hammond C-3 organ
- Carol Kaye – Danelectro 6-string bass guitar
- Lyle Ritz – upright bass
- Billy Strange – 12-string Mosrite Combo XII electric guitar

The Sid Sharp Strings

- Arnold Belnick – violin
- Norman Botnick – viola
- Joseph Saxon – cello
- Ralph Schaeffer – violin
- Sid Sharp – violin
- Tibor Zelig – violin

Technical staff

- Chuck Britz – engineer
- Bowen David – engineer

== Cover versions ==
- 1993 – Linda Ronstadt, Winter Light
- 1998 – Fennesz, Plays
- 2001 – Anne Sofie von Otter and Elvis Costello, For the Stars
- 2022 – Jeff Beck and Johnny Depp, 18

== Bibliography ==
- Badman, Keith (2004). The Beach Boys: The Definitive Diary of America's Greatest Band, on Stage and in the Studio. Backbeat Books. ISBN 978-0-87930-818-6.
- Dillon, Mark (2012). Fifty Sides of the Beach Boys: The Songs That Tell Their Story. ECW Press. ISBN 978-1-77090-198-8.
- Granata, Charles L. (2003). Wouldn't It Be Nice: Brian Wilson and the Making of the Beach Boys' Pet Sounds. ISBN 9781556525070.
- Kent, Nick (1995). "The Last Beach Movie Revisited: The Life of Brian Wilson". The Dark Stuff: Selected Writings on Rock Music. Da Capo Press. pp. 1–74. ISBN 0306806460.
- Lambert, Philip (2007). Inside the Music of Brian Wilson: The Songs, Sounds, and Influences of the Beach Boys' Founding Genius. Bloomsbury Publishing. ISBN 978-1-4411-0748-0.
- Lambert, Philip (March 2008). "Brian Wilson's Pet Sounds". Twentieth-Century Music. 5 (1). Cambridge University Press: 109–133. doi:10.1017/S1478572208000625. S2CID 162871617.
- Lambert, Philip (2016). "Brian Wilson's Harmonic Language". In Lambert, Philip (ed.). Good Vibrations: Brian Wilson and the Beach Boys in Critical Perspective. University of Michigan Press. ISBN 978-0-472-11995-0.
- O'Regan, Jade Simone (2014). When I Grow Up: The Development of the Beach Boys' Sound (1962-1966) (PDF) (Thesis). Queensland Conservatorium. doi:10.25904/1912/2556.
- White, Timothy (1996). The Nearest Faraway Place: Brian Wilson, the Beach Boys, and the Southern Californian Experience. Macmillan. ISBN 0333649370.
