= Tees Valley Youth Orchestra =

Logo

The Tees Valley Youth Orchestra is the flagship youth orchestra of Tees Valley Music Service and one of the largest youth orchestras in the UK, which welcomes the best music students across the four boroughs of the Tees Valley (Middlesbrough, Redcar & Cleveland, Stockton-on-Tees and Hartlepool) and indeed from all over the North East of England. The orchestra also draws some members from further afield, such as North Yorkshire, making it the only full sized youth orchestra that meets regularly in the North East of England. Rehearsals take place every Friday night during term time from 6:30 to 9:15 at Teesside High School. The orchestra was originally conducted by David Kendall in the 1980s. David Kendal conducted the orchestra as well as being head of the music service and handed the baton to Christopher Johns on retirement in 2006. From 2006 to 2010, the orchestra was conducted by Chris Johns, who retired in December 2010 after being appointed as Director of Music at Leicester Cathedral. Nicholas Nowicki has conducted the orchestra since January 2011, assisted by tutors who work with the different sections of the orchestra for the first half of four rehearsals per term.

Highlights of the orchestra have included a concert performance of the popular opera Carmen by Bizet, as well as the debut performance of Samuel Coleridge-Taylor's 'Symphony in A minor', which had been lost for many years. TVYO also performed Mu Ara, a piece it commissioned from the popular composer Geoffrey Palmer. In recent years, the orchestra has performed all of Tchaikovsky's last three symphonies and in 2009 and 2011-2017 was invited to perform at the National Festival of Music for Youth in Symphony Hall, Birmingham. In 2013, the orchestra gave two memorable performances of Shostakovich's 5th Symphony.

The orchestra often forms a stepping stone for students into a musical career, and many students from the orchestra also play in National Youth ensembles and go on to study music at conservatoires or universities.

The orchestra takes part in a bi-annual tour, and in recent years has visited France, Catalonia, Spain, Italy, Germany, Belgium, the Czech Republic and Hungary. The orchestra will be visiting Granada to play at various music festivals across Spain in July, 2018. The Tees Valley Youth Choir occasionally join the orchestra when on tour abroad, and the two ensembles perform concerts together, often to packed, enthusiastic audiences. A recent highlight of their 2012 tour to the Black Forest was a performance on the Johann Strauss stage in Baden-Baden. In July 2014, TVYO performed as part of the prestigious Florence International Festival of Youth Orchestras.

== TVYO Tour to Carnegie Hall ==
In September 2017, Tees Valley Music Service announced plans to send the Youth Orchestra to perform at Carnegie Hall in New York in Summer 2019. With their previous tour accomplishments and garnering international acclaim from performing in Budapest and Spain, representatives from Carnegie Hall contacted the music service and offered the Youth Orchestra a slot in its Summer schedule at a discounted rate. Unsurprisingly, this once-in-a-lifetime international tour to America was a huge challenge for TVMS as the logistics and funding involved would be momentous. £200,000 would have to be raised over two years.

The music service launched two major fundraising campaigns in Summer 2017 in an effort to raise

== See also ==
- Tees Valley Youth Choir
- The Tees Valley Youth Wind Orchestra
- Tees Valley Youth Brass Band
- List of youth orchestras
