= Tees Valley Youth Choir =

Tees Valley Youth Choir, or commonly abbreviated and referred to as TVYC, is the flagship choir of Tees Valley Music Service. Its members are made up of 13- to 19-year-olds and recruits from the boroughs of Stockton-on-Tees, Hartlepool, Middlesbrough, Darlington, and Redcar & Cleveland. It also draws members from further afield, particularly North Yorkshire, County Durham and surrounding areas.

The choir was established in 1993 by John Forsyth MBE (County Music Adviser for Cleveland at the time). Since then, invitations to perform at National and International events have been a regular feature. John Forsyth MBE conducted the choir, which has produced many professional and semi-professional singers over the years, until summer 2010. He handed the baton to Andy King at his retirement concert at The Sage Gateshead in September 2010. Successful yearly European concert tours have taken the choir to Spain, Italy, Hungary, Slovakia, Belgium, France, Poland, the Czech Republic and Germany, usually alongside the Tees Valley Youth Orchestra.

== Concerts and Performances ==
Tees Valley Youth Choir perform many concerts as part of their annual programme of events. As well as performing in the Tees Valley and North Yorkshire, the choir takes part in concerts throughout the United Kingdom and Europe. In its busy schedule, the choir performed at The Sage Gateshead in August 2006, as part of a grand choral concert for the Association of British Choral Directors (ABCD). In the summer of 2008 Howard Goodall CBE, the well-known British composer and presenter, asked the choir to perform his requiem "Eternal Light" at the Newcastle Theatre Royal in March 2009.

Choir members appeared with a number of major artists in the recording and music video of a cover version of God Only Knows simulcast on BBC television and radio channels on 7 October 2014 to launch BBC Music, which was subsequently released as a charity single for Children in Need 2014. More recently, TVYC have performed on the Videopolis Stage in Disneyland Paris as part of their 2018 tour to France.

== Competitions ==
In 2006, TVYC was successful in reaching the finals in the Youth category of the BBC Radio 3 Choir of the Year competition and also won a "wildcard" judges' decision place through to the Grand Final (all categories). Both finals were held at the Cardiff Millennium Centre. The choir sang first in the Grand Final on 10 December, singing "Sing Joyfully" (William Byrd), "Lully Lulla" (Kenneth Leighton) and "Yver" (Debussy). TVYC came 2nd to Chantage, separated only by 4 and a half marks. 400 choirs entered the competition from the start almost a year beforehand.

The choir has been successfully auditioned for the finals of the National Festival of Music for Youth multiple times. In 2011, The choir performed at Adrian Boult Hall in Birmingham and achieved the highest award for their renditions of "Bogorodise Devo" (Sergei Rachmaninoff), "Armottoman Osa" (Mia Makaroff), "Contre Qui, Rose" (Morten Lauridsen) and "The Battle of Jericho" (Moses Hogan). This resulted in an invitation to perform at the pieces at the Schools Prom in November 2011 at the Royal Albert Hall.

In 2012, the choir returned to Birmingham to perform "Salve Regina" (Lars Jansson, Gunnar Eriksson), "Sleep" (Eric Whitacre) and "Kalinda" (Sydney Guillaume) at Birmingham Town Hall. The choir once again received the highest commendation.

== Members ==
Every year the choir loses several members as they leave the area to continue their studies at various universities. Many TVYC members are also members of the award-winning Tees Valley Youth Orchestra and the Tees Valley Youth Brass Band.
