= Bouncing Down (Audio Engineering) =

Sound recording technique

Bouncing Down (also called, "reduction mixing", "bouncing tracks", or simply "bouncing") is a multitrack audio recording technique which takes advantage of magnetic tape’s rewritable nature in order to circumvent its limited number of tracks. Even as analog tape recorders have grown in sophistication and track count, the technique remains an important tool in analog music production.

== Process ==
The technique involves combining multiple previously recorded audio signals. A series of discrete recordings can be printed (bounced down) from their individual tracks on the tape's surface to either an unused monophonic track, or panned across an unsused stereo pair of tracks, thus freeing up additional space for further overdubs.

If one is recording a drum kit in stereo but only has eight available tracks, instead of recording the kit as a whole to a stereo pair of tracks, multiple elements of the kit can be recorded and then migrated (bounced) to the stereo pair. For example, microphones could be placed on the kick drum, snare drum, hi-hat, rack tom, floor tom, and cymbals, the amplified signal of each feeding an individual tape track. This allows for each source to be individually processed and panned (placed) within a stereo field. Once the six recordings are satisfactorily mixed, they can be bounced down to the remaining stereo pair. The drum recording is now preserved on two tracks with six tracks newly available to record additional instrumentation. The process can be repeated indefinitely, resulting in increasingly layered recordings. However, additional machine noise, tape hiss, and tape saturation will be added to the recording with each consecutive bounce.

== Examples ==
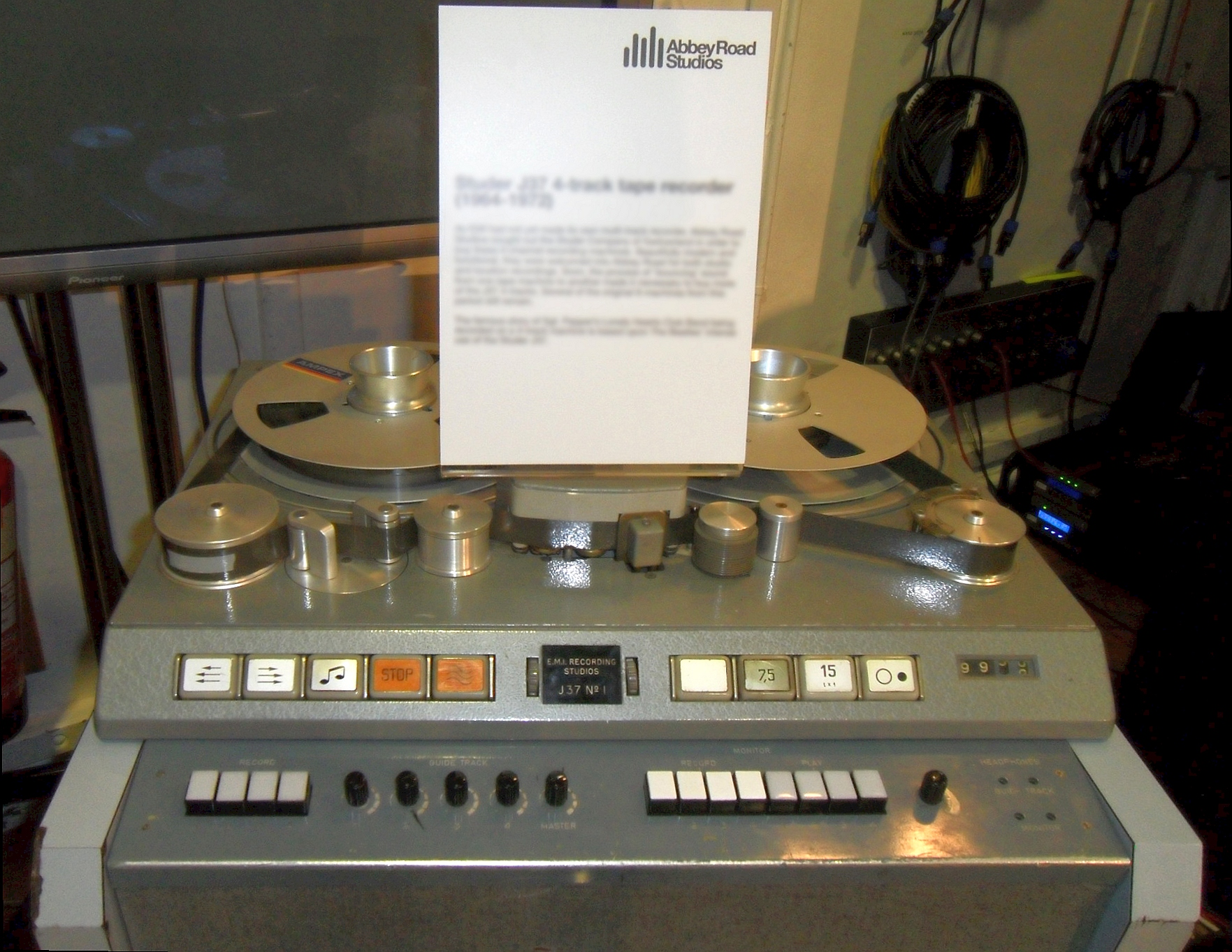
- Studer J37 4-track tape recorder (1964-1972), Abbey Road Studios
  Despite the availability of 8-track recorders, The Beatles' 1967 album, Sgt. Pepper’s Lonely Hearts Club Band, was recorded using only a 4-track machine and took over 400 hours to complete. To realize the album's complex orchestration, producer George Martin would bounce down successive recordings, slowly layering overdubs to achieve the Beatles' desired sound.
- Freddie Mercury's backing vocals on Queen's 1975 single, Bohemian Rhapsody, were bounced down from three individually recorded harmony tracks to a single mono track.
- For much of the production of their 1966 album, Pet Sounds, Beach Boys co-founder Brian Wilson recorded the instrumental portion of the album using a 4-track recorder. He then bounced these recordings onto a single track of an 8-track tape, using the remaining seven tracks for vocal overdubs.

== Use in Digital Music Production ==
In the context of digital recording technologies, which since their introduction in the late 1960s have developed to allow for a near infinite number of individual tracks, bouncing becomes an esthetic or organizational decision rather than a necessity and the term often refers to creating a mono or stereo audio file from the digital multitrack in the Digital audio workstation.

== See Also ==
Portastudio

Multitrack recording
