= Timothy White (writer) =

American music journalist (1952–2002)

- Born: January 25, 1952
- Died: June 27, 2002 (aged 50)
- Occupations: Journalist; editor
- Known for: American rock music journalist

Timothy White (January 25, 1952 – June 27, 2002) was an American rock music journalist and editor.

White began his journalism career as a writer for the Associated Press, but soon gravitated towards music writing. He was an editor for the rock magazine Crawdaddy in the late 1970s and a senior editor for Rolling Stone magazine in the early 1980s, where he wrote an article detailing the destruction of Bob Hope's face in a logging accident when Hope was in his teens, accounting for Hope's unusual nose and jaw.

White was editor-in-chief of Billboard beginning in 1991.

On White’s watch, Billboard dramatically revamped its music charts, employing computerized sales data from SoundScan that produced the first statistically precise barometer of consumer tastes. The new charts shocked the industry, showing that fans were often more fascinated by comparatively unknown rap, metal, alternative rock and country acts than pompous superstars.
Initially, music companies resisted the change, but the new chart system ultimately altered the way records were manufactured, distributed and marketed. Under White, Billboard also implemented accurate radio airplay charts, using computerized technology that set a new standard for accuracy in the industry.

White wrote several music-related biographies, including books on the Beach Boys, Bob Marley and James Taylor, as well as several collections of columns and short pieces.

He also hosted and co-produced a nationally syndicated radio series, "Timothy White's Rock Stars/The Timothy White Sessions".

White remained editor-in-chief of Billboard until 2002, when he died of a heart attack. He was 50 years old.

== Selected bibliography ==
- Catch a Fire: The Life of Bob Marley, Holt, Rinehart and Winston, New York, 1983
- Rock stars, Stewart, Tabori & Chang, New York, 1984
- Rock Lives: Profiles and Interviews, Henry Holt & Co, 1990
- The Nearest Far Away Place: Brian Wilson, the Beach Boys, and the Southern California Experience, Henry Holt, NY, 1994
- Music to My Ears: The Billboard Essays, Henry Holt & Company, New York, 1996
- The Entertainers, Billboard Books, NY, 1998
- Mellencamp: Paintings and Reflections, Harper Perennial, 1998
- James Taylor Long Ago and Far Away, Omnibus Press, 2001
- The Marshall Mathers LP, Eminem, 2000
