= Tony Asher =

American songwriter and advertising copywriter (born 1939)

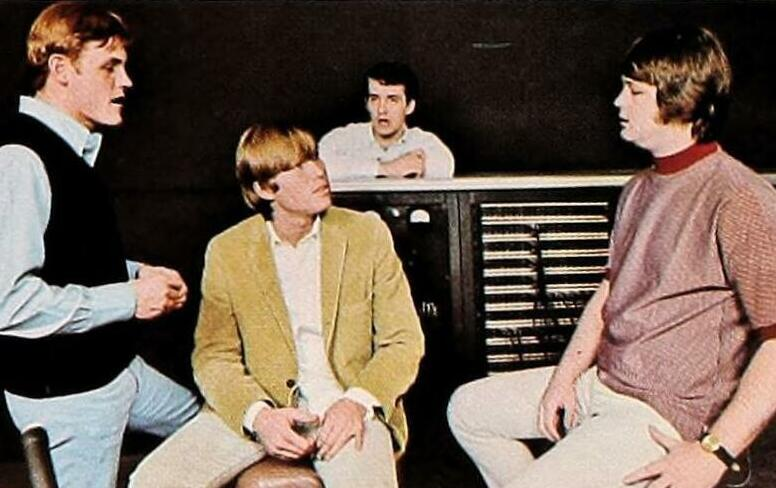
- Asher (back) with Bruce Johnston (left), Terry Melcher (middle) and Brian Wilson (right) in early 1966
- Born: Anthony D. Asher; May 2, 1939 (age 87); London, England, UK
- Occupations: Songwriter, jingle writer, copywriter
- Relatives: Laura La Plante (mother); Irving Asher (father)
- Writing career
- Years active: 1960s–present
- Notable work: Pet Sounds (lyricist)

Anthony D. Asher (born May 2, 1939) is an American songwriter and advertising copywriter who is notable for his collaborations with Brian Wilson (of the Beach Boys) and Roger Nichols in the 1960s. Asher co-wrote eight songs on the Beach Boys' 1966 album Pet Sounds, including the singles "God Only Knows", "Wouldn't It Be Nice", and "Caroline, No". According to Asher, he mainly served as a lyricist for Wilson's songs, but in some cases also contributed musical ideas. Asher also composed jingles, such as Mattel's slogan "You can tell it's Mattel—it's swell!", and contributed songs to The Partridge Family.

== Background ==
Tony Asher was born in London on May 2, 1939, to American actress Laura La Plante and film producer Irving Asher. He relocated to Los Angeles with his mother before the age of six months, while his father remained in England during World War II as a member of the U.S. Army. As a child, he played piano and began composing.

He earned a degree in journalism from UCLA and worked at the Carson/Roberts/Inc. advertising agency, where he created the slogan "You can tell it's Mattel—it's swell!" for Mattel; its success led to additional work writing advertisements and jingles for Barbie and Chatty Cathy dolls. Among his colleagues at the firm were Terry Gilliam and Joel Siegel. He also collaborated on songwriting with Van Dyke Parks.

== Pet Sounds ==
I asked [Tony] what it was like writing commercials for an advertising company. It seemed like interesting work. I said, "You should be good with words if you can do that." And, he said, "I'm pretty good with words." Out of nowhere I said "Would you like to work with me on some songs and write some lyrics?" "I'll give it a try." Then, Pet Sounds, like that.

— Brian Wilson, 2007

According to most sources, Asher met Brian Wilson while recording at United Western Recorders in 1965. At the time, Asher was a 26-year-old copywriter working on advertising jingles who regarded the Beach Boys as distinct from other artists, having released a sequence of hits where "you wouldn't even know, necessarily, that it was gonna be a Beach Boys record from the first bar or something." Although a fan, he stated: "I didn't own any of their albums. I had Bill Evans albums."

Asher recounted that he was working on music or voice-overs for a commercial when he learned that the Beach Boys were in another studio. During a break, he and others lingered in the hallway before entering the booth, where Wilson was alone in the studio. This encounter led to their meeting. (Note: Other accounts state that Asher and Wilson first met during a social gathering at the home of their mutual friend Loren Schwartz. Asher recalled that Schwartz had been a classmate at Santa Monica College and that he occasionally encountered Wilson at Schwartz's residence, although Wilson "never stayed long". According to biographer Peter Ames Carlin, their initial meeting may have occurred as early as 1963. Schwartz himself claimed that he was introduced to Wilson by Asher, "my best pal in college," at Western Studio. Asked why he chose Asher as a collaborator, Wilson replied that he "thought he was a cool person" and was impressed by his association with Schwartz, "a very brainy guy, a real verbal type person.") Seeking a departure from the band's established themes of surfing and cars, and opting not to work with his previous songwriting partners, Wilson contacted Asher around December 1965. Within ten days, the two began writing the majority of the material that would appear on Pet Sounds.

Wilson and Asher collaborated for about three weeks. Asher contributed minimally to the music itself, primarily serving as a second opinion while Wilson developed melodies and chord progressions. The two traded ideas as the songs evolved. He later characterized the process as "writing an autobiography", though he "wouldn't limit it to Brian's autobiography." Asher contended that his most significant musical contributions were to "I Just Wasn't Made for These Times", "Caroline, No", and "That's Not Me". He stated that he conceived the title and subject matter for three of their eight songs. Regarding royalties, Asher accepted a 25 percent share of the publishing, which he felt undervalued his input; he described the deal as "a screw", but added, "Until you consider that I was a nothing who had never done shit, and I had a chance to write with a guy who had something like nine million-selling records in a row. Well, then it doesn't seem so bad."

In later years, Asher described his time with Wilson and the bandmates as an "embarrassing" experience. (Note: Asher recalled that Wilson "exhibit[ed] this awful taste" in movies and often digressed into lengthy conversations about mysticism or women. He referred to Wilson as "the single most irresponsible person" he had met, citing instances such as uncashed royalty checks for $100,000 found at Wilson's house. He also expressed confusion over Wilson's marriage to Marilyn, describing their relationship as "like something out of The Flintstones". Asked whether Wilson had exhibited signs of "lunacy", Asher recalled "fits of this uncontrollable anger" followed by episodes in which Wilson would cry during playback sessions. He attributed Wilson's bipolar moods more to "the whole claustrophobic scene with him and his family" than to his LSD use.) He later called Wilson a "genius musician but an amateur human being". Referencing this remark in a 2013 interview, Asher said that he "didn't mean that in the way it came out", explaining, "We all have areas of things we're good at and things we're not so good at, but his is so zeroed-in on music."

After their songs were completed, Asher visited a few of the recording sessions, most of which were string overdub dates. He did not have a favorable reaction when he learned of the album's title, recalling that Wilson showed him zoo-themed photo proofs and mentioned the title Pet Sounds, which Asher felt "trivialized what we had accomplished", though he acknowledged that many of Wilson's unconventional ideas had proven effective. Asher was not invited to contribute to another Beach Boys album; he stated that he was unsurprised, citing the perception that Pet Sounds had been a commercial failure and that other band members had opposed Wilson's decision to collaborate with him. Mike Love said that he thought "Asher's lyrics were great. I found no fault whatsoever with his lyrical contributions."

== Later career ==
Following Pet Sounds, Asher collaborated with Roger Nichols. He also wrote several songs with composer-arranger John Bahler recorded by The Partridge Family and used on their television show. As a copywriter and creative director at several advertising agencies (including Carson/Roberts/Inc.), Asher wrote and produced dozens of jingles for Mattel Toys, Gallo Wines, Max Factor Cosmetics, Glendale Federal Savings, and others.

After leaving the advertising agency business, Asher teamed with John Bahler to form Producer's Music Service, a jingle and scoring production company in Hollywood. Asher eventually went to work for Bass/Yager and Associates, a Los Angeles graphic design firm headed by designer Saul Bass. Asher spent 12 years at the firm, the last eight as president.

In the late 1990s, Wilson and Asher rekindled their writing partnership and wrote at least four songs together. Only two were released: "This Isn't Love" and "Everything I Need". A piano-only rendition of "This Isn't Love" was issued on the 1997 compilation Songs Without Words, while a full-band live performance was released on Wilson's 2002 album Live at the Roxy Theatre. In 1997, "Everything I Need" appeared on The Wilsons, a project involving Wilson and his daughters Carnie and Wendy.
