= Fantastic Mr Fox (disambiguation) =

Fantastic Mr Fox is a 1970 children's book by Roald Dahl.

Fantastic Mr Fox may also refer to:

- Fantastic Mr. Fox (film), a 2009 film adaptation by Wes Anderson
  - Fantastic Mr. Fox (soundtrack), original soundtrack of the film
- Fantastic Mr Fox (musical), a 2016 musical theatre adaptation
- Fantastic Mr. Fox (opera), a 1998 opera adaptation
