= Fantastic Mr. Fox (soundtrack) =

2009 soundtrack album by Alexandre Desplat and various artists

Fantastic Mr. Fox (Original Soundtrack)

Soundtrack album by Alexandre Desplat and various artists
- Released: November 10, 2009
- Recorded: 2008–2009
- Venues: Abbey Road Studios, London; Studio Guillaume Tell, Suresnes; APC Studios, Montreal; Sterling Sound, Nashville, Tennessee
- Genres: Film score; film soundtrack
- Length: 50:00
- Label: ABKCO
- Producers: Wes Anderson; Randall Poster

Alexandre Desplat chronology
Julie & Julia (2009)	Fantastic Mr. Fox (2009)	The Twilight Saga: New Moon (2009)

Wes Anderson film soundtracks chronology
The Darjeeling Limited (2009)	Fantastic Mr. Fox (2009)	Moonrise Kingdom (2012)

Fantastic Mr. Fox (Original Soundtrack) is the soundtrack to the 2009 film Fantastic Mr. Fox directed by Wes Anderson. The film's soundtrack featured a selection of songs from The Beach Boys, The Bobby Fuller Four, Burl Ives, Georges Delerue, The Rolling Stones, and other artists. An original score composed by Alexandre Desplat accompanied the remainder of the album. ABKCO Records released the soundtrack on November 10, 2009, three days ahead of the film. Desplat was nominated for the Academy Award for Best Original Score and BAFTA Award for Best Original Music for his work in the film.

== Development ==
In 2006, Anderson's frequent collaborator Mark Mothersbaugh was announced that he was working on the soundtrack. However, during the production, Mothersbaugh was replaced by Alexandre Desplat who would later collaborate on all of Anderson's films. Desplat and Anderson met at Stephen Gaghan's wedding and thereafter, Anderson contacted the former on his involvement which he agreed. Later, Desplat was invited to the editing room in Paris and eventually started working on the film's music, which he described it as "an easy way of bonding together".

During their initial discussions, Desplat recalled that he read the original source material—the novel by Roald Dahl—instead of watching the film, hence, he was familiar with the characters. Wes demanded melodies, that would provide a childlike wonder and had a simplicity which was an integral part of the score. Unlike, other American films which had a large orchestra, Anderson refrained from using that as it would overpower the puppet characters. He then suggested for writing a mini-symphonic orchestra having multiple baby instruments—a string quartet, brass section with only one instrument per section, and a combination of glockenspiels, triangles, little pieces forming percussion instruments—that provide an intimate sound different from the symphonic orchestra, adding that "the melodies' simplicity, the tiny instruments, all that created a very different sound that was very exciting for us".

The piece "Boggis, Bunce and Bean" featured a boys choir under the age of 8–11. Anderson eventually brought all the puppets from the film to the recording studio "to the boys so they would not be nervous and they could be relaxed and enjoy the moment", says Desplat. Besides composing Desplat further performed whistles for the score, for a mean rat and eventually insisted on composing a piece with a whistle. He described it as a part of the fun and childlike nature of the film.

The film also featured a compilation of original and pre-existing songs. Jarvis Cocker revealed that he had written nearly 3–4 songs which would be integrated into the score. However, the only song he wrote for the film was "Fantastic Mr. Fox AKA Petey's Song". Contributions from The Beach Boys, The Bobby Fuller Four, Burl Ives, Georges Delerue, The Rolling Stones, Nancy Adams, Art Tatum and The Wellingtons were included in the film as well as the album.

== Reception ==
Christian Clemmensen of Filmtracks.com wrote "[Desplat's] approach to this concept could drive a person insane, and since that was probably the intent, it's easy to get the feeling that his one is aimed exclusively at enthusiasts of the film." Rob Mitchum of Pitchfork rated 7.1 out of 10 and wrote "With Fantastic Mr. Fox, Wes Anderson, ever the obsessive soundtracker, creates another value-added souvenir in the spirit of a literally wonderful film." Gissane Sophia of Marvelous Geeks Media wrote "The entire soundtrack ultimately feels like it should be playing at a theme park, but that’s neither here nor there." A critic from Unsung Sundays wrote "The Fantastic Mr. Fox Soundtrack is a great place to start." Matt Bochenski of Little White Lies wrote "Alexandre Desplat’s score is skilfully integrated into the action".

Michael Leader of Den of Geek described it as "masterful". Sheri Linden of The Hollywood Reporter wrote "Boomer faves by the Beach Boys and the Stones punctuate the soundtrack, with Alexandre Desplat delivering an elegant gallop of a score." John Young of Entertainment Weekly wrote "composer Alexandre Desplat wrote one of the most delectable scores in quite some time". Fionnuala Halligan of Screen International wrote that Desplat's "French-influenced score is a delight". Robert Levin of Film School Rejects described it as a "jaunty soundtrack".

== Track listing ==
All music is composed by Alexandre Desplat, except where noted.

Fantastic Mr. Fox (Original Soundtrack)
No.	Title	Writer(s)	Performer(s)	Length
1.	"American Empirical Pictures"			0:14
2.	"The Ballad of Davy Crockett"	George Bruns; Tom W. Blackburn	The Wellingtons	1:40
3.	"Mr. Fox in the Fields"			1:02
4.	"Heroes and Villains"	Brian Wilson; Van Dyke Parks	The Beach Boys	3:37
5.	"Fooba Wooba John"	Traditional	Burl Ives	1:07
6.	"Boggis, Bunce and Bean"			0:51
7.	"Jimmy Squirrel and Co."			0:46
8.	"Love"	George Bruns; Floyd Huddleston	Nancy Adams	1:49
9.	"Buckeye Jim"	Burl Ives	Burl Ives	1:19
10.	"High-Speed French Train"			1:26
11.	"Whack-Bat Majorette"			2:56
12.	"The Grey Goose"	Burl Ives	Burl Ives	2:48
13.	"Bean's Secret Cider Cellar"			2:06
14.	"Une Petite Ile"	Georges Delerue	Georges Delerue	1:35
15.	"Street Fighting Man"	Mick Jagger; Keith Richards	The Rolling Stones	3:14
16.	"Fantastic Mr. Fox AKA Petey's Song"	Jarvis Cocker; Wes Anderson; Noah Baumbach	Jarvis Cocker	1:20
17.	"Night and Day"	Cole Porter	Art Tatum	1:27
18.	"Kristofferson's Theme"			1:35
19.	"Just Another Dead Rat in a Garbage Pail (Behind a Chinese Restaurant)"			2:33
20.	"Le Grand Choral"	Georges Delerue	Georges Delerue	2:23
21.	"Great Harrowsford Square"			3:20
22.	"Stunt Expo 2004"			2:27
23.	"Canis Lupus"			1:15
24.	"Ol' Man River"	Oscar Hammerstein II; Jerome Kern	The Beach Boys	1:18
25.	"Let Her Dance"	Bobby Fuller	The Bobby Fuller Four	2:32
26.	"I Get Around"	Brian Wilson; Mike Love	The Beach Boys	2:13
27.	"Fantastic Mr. Fox AKA Petey's Song" (Reprise)	Jarvis Cocker; Wes Anderson; Noah Baumbach	Jarvis Cocker	1:43
Total length:				50:00

== Complete score ==
A complete score album was released by 20th Century Fox as a part of the For Your Consideration (FYC) campaign for the 2009–10 film awards season. The album contains 47 cues from Desplat's score featured in the film in its entirety.

Fantastic Mr. Fox (Best Original Score)
No.	Title	Length
1.	"Opening"
2.	"Mr. Fox In The Fields"
3.	"Tree House"
4.	"I Used To Steal Birds"
5.	"The Farmers"
6.	"Moving In"
7.	"Who Am I"
8.	"Trains"
9.	"Planning Boggis Raid Part 1"
10.	"Planning Boggis Raid Part 2"
11.	"Planning Boggis Raid Part 3"
12.	"Master Plan Part 1"
13.	"Master Plan Part 2"
14.	"Master Plan Part 3"
15.	"Stealing Chickens Part 1"
16.	"Stealing Chickens Part 2"
17.	"Stealing Chickens Part 3"
18.	"Stealing Chickens Part 4"
19.	"Whack Bat"
20.	"Kristofferson Joins"
21.	"Rat And Cider Part 1"
22.	"Rat And Cider Part 2"
23.	"Rat And Cider Part 3"
24.	"Any Fox Problems"
25.	"The Shooting Part 1"
26.	"The Shooting Part 2"
27.	"Digging Us Out/Dig!"
28.	"The Siege Begins"
29.	"What's That"
30.	"Underground Wit Badger"
31.	"Fox Thinks"
32.	"Begin (Stealing Chickens) Part 1"
33.	"Begin (Stealing Chickens) Part 2"
34.	"The Bean Kitchen"
35.	"Father And Son"
36.	"Ransom Note"
37.	"Rat Rumble"
38.	"Rat's Demise"
39.	"Surrender Note/Shoot Out"
40.	"Ash To The Rescue"
41.	"Ash The Hero"
42.	"The Great Escape"
43.	"Canis Lupus"
44.	"Trains Reprise"
45.	"Supermarket Toast"
46.	"Trains (End Credits)"
47.	"Side Car (End Credits)"

== Fantastic Mr. Fox (Additional Music from the Original Score – The Abbey Road Mixes) ==
Fantastic Mr. Fox (Additional Music from the Original Score – The Abbey Road Mixes)

Film score by Alexandre Desplat
- Released: March 2, 2010
- Recorded: 2008–2009
- Venues: Abbey Road Studios, London
- Genre: Film score
- Length: 47:19
- Label: ABKCO
- Producer: Alexandre Desplat

A second soundtrack album Fantastic Mr. Fox (Additional Music from the Original Score – The Abbey Road Mixes) was released on March 2, 2010. The album features the remainder of the film score composed by Desplat. It was released in anticipation of the 82nd Academy Awards where Desplat was nominated for the Academy Award for Best Original Score.

Fantastic Mr. Fox (Additional Music from the Original Score – The Abbey Road Mixes)
No.	Title	Length
1.	"Moving In"	1:07
2.	"Mr. Fox In The Fields Medley"	3:02
3.	"Trains"	1:54
4.	"Side Car Escape"	1:10
5.	"Shoot Out"	2:25
6.	"Kristofferson"	1:36
7.	"Plan B"	1:42
8.	"Trains 2"	1:55
9.	"Looking For Cider"	2:34
10.	"Death Of Rat"	1:12
11.	"Whack-Bat Majorette Ensemble"	3:36
12.	"Canis Lupus"	1:17
13.	"Trains 3"	1:55
14.	"Rat Fight"	3:54
15.	"Dig!"	1:25
16.	"Mr. Fox's Promenade"	1:22
17.	"Three Farmers"	2:24
18.	"Kristofferson 2"	1:40
19.	"Boggis Bunce And Bean (Reprise)"	1:19
20.	"Trains 4"	1:55
21.	"Mr. and Mrs. Fox"	1:07
22.	"Canis Lupus 2"	1:16
23.	"Finale"	1:09
24.	"Choir Boys Farewell (To The Puppets)"	4:36
Total length:		47:19

== Personnel ==
Credits adapted from liner notes

- Music composed and produced by – Alexandre Desplat
- Soundtrack producer – Randall Poster, Wes Anderson
- Recording – Andrew Dudman, Peter Cobbin, Sam Ockell
- Mixing – Andrew Dudman
- Mastering – Greg Calbi
- Score editor – Peter Clarke
- Supervising score editor – Gerard McCann
- Music co-ordinator – Jim Dunbar, Xavier Forcioli

Orchestra

- Orchestration – Alexandre Desplat, Jean-Pascal Beintus, Marie-Christine Desplat
- Conductor – Alexandre Desplat
- Orchestra contractor – Isobel Griffiths
- Assistant orchestra contractor – Lucy Whalley
- Copyist – Claude Romano, Norbert Vergonjanne
- Pro-tools operator – Andy Kitchen, John Barrett, Tristan Montrocq

Musicians

- Banjo – John Parricelli, Nigel Woodhouse
- Celesta – Dave Arch
- Double bass – Chris Laurence
- Drum kit – Ralph Salmins
- Guitar – John Parricelli, Mitch Dalton, Nigel Woodhouse
- Jew's Harp, spoons, toy percussion – Paul Clarvis
- Keyboard percussions – Frank Ricotti
- Mandolin – John Parricelli, Alison Stephens
- Recorder – Helen Keen
- Piccolo trumpet – Maurice Murphy
- Recorder – Annabel Knight, Jill Kemp, Piers Adams, Helen Keen
- Timpani – Tristan Fry
- Ukulele – John Parricelli
- Vocals – Felix Wareing

Management

- Music production co-ordinator – Teri Landi
- Music business and legal affairs – Peter Howard
- Music licensing and clearance – Jessica Dolinger, Sara Matarazzo
- Executive in charge of marketing and promotion – Iris Keitel
- Executive in charge of sales – Joe Parker
- Executive in charge of soundtracks – Alisa Coleman
- Marketing and promotion – Michael Kirk, Tracey Jordan

Cover artwork

- Packaging and design – Brian Fitzpatrick, Mike Heinzer
- Liner notes – Wes Anderson

== Accolades ==
Award	Date of ceremony	Category	Recipients	Result	Ref.
Academy Awards	March 7, 2010	Best Original Score	Alexandre Desplat	Nominated	
British Academy Film Awards	February 15, 2010	Best Original Music	Alexandre Desplat	Nominated	
Chicago Film Critics Association	December 21, 2009	Best Original Score	Alexandre Desplat	Nominated	
Houston Film Critics Society	December 19, 2009	Best Original Score	Alexandre Desplat	Nominated	
Houston Film Critics Society	December 19, 2009	Best Original Song	"Fantastic Mr. Fox AKA Petey's Song" — Jarvis Cocker, Noah Baumbach and Wes Anderson	Nominated	
International Film Music Critics Association	December 14, 2009	Best Original Score for an Animated Film	Alexandre Desplat	Nominated	
Los Angeles Film Critics Association	December 14, 2009	Best Music	Alexandre Desplat	Won	
Online Film Critics Society	January 5, 2010	Best Original Score	Alexandre Desplat	Nominated	
San Diego Film Critics Society	December 15, 2009	Best Original Score	Alexandre Desplat	Nominated	
World Soundtrack Awards	October 23, 2010	Film Score of the Year	Alexandre Desplat	Won	
World Soundtrack Awards	October 23, 2010	Soundtrack Composer of the Year	Alexandre Desplat (Note: also for The Twilight Saga: New Moon, Julie & Julia (both 2009) and The Ghost Writer (2010))	Won	
