= Linbury Prize for Stage Design =

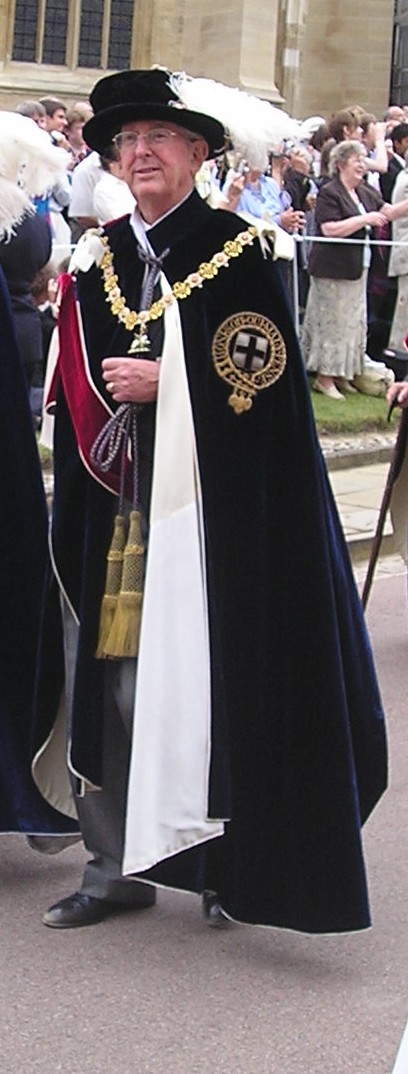
John Sainsbury, Baron Sainsbury of Preston Candover, co-founder of Linbury Trust

The Linbury Prize for Stage Design is the most prestigious prize for emerging stage designers with professional focus on theatre, dance, and opera companies in the United Kingdom. Since 1987, it has been awarded every two years.

== History ==
In 1973, Lord Sainsbury of Preston Candover KG (John Sainsbury) and his wife Lady Sainsbury, CBE, the former ballerina Anya Linden, founded the charitable Linbury Trust (Linbury is a portmanteau combining the names Linden and Sainsbury). The Linbury Prize, intending to launch the careers of young stage designers, is funded entirely by the Linbury Trust and supported by a group of advocates, endorsing its aims. The first Linbury Prizes were awarded in 1987.

== Selection ==
The selection to determine the winners follows a procedure:

- The designs of entrants, recent graduates of theatre design courses at colleges across the United Kingdom, are presented to a group of three jurors.
- The designs of more than twelve candidates are selected.
- The selected candidates present their designs to the directors and choreographers of three previously selected, commissioning British theatre, opera house, or dance companies.
- Each company selects three designers with whom they desire to collaborate.
- The twelve finalists are asked to create designs for the companies forthcoming productions. Their expenses are covered by a sum supplied by the Linbury Trust.
- Four designs, one for each production, are selected. Their creators are the winners of the Linbury Prize for Stage Design, which is the commission to realise the selected designs on stage. Financial support for the winner as well as for the commissioning company is supplied by the Linbury Trust.

== Winners ==
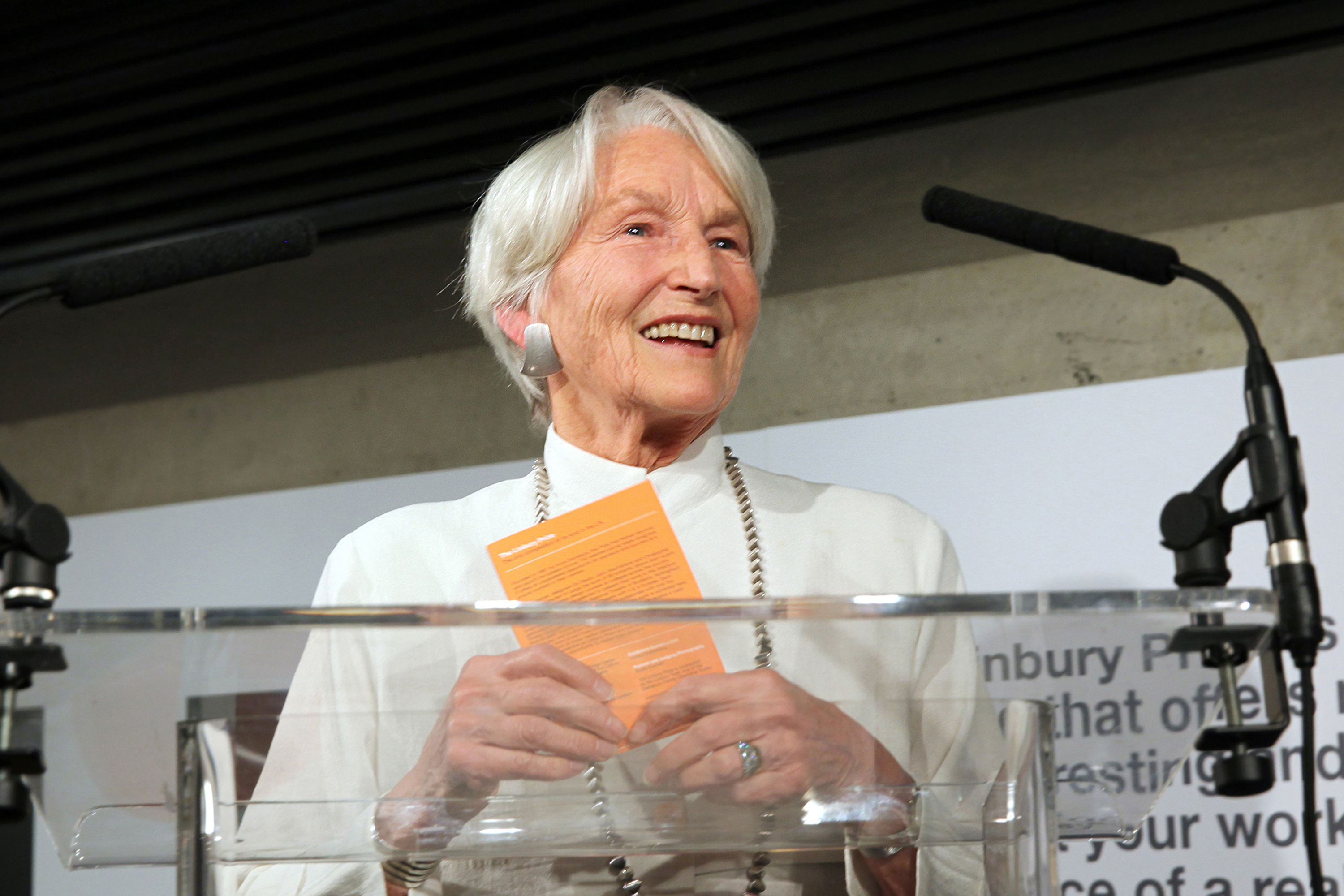
Lady Sainsbury of Preston Candover, speaking at the Linbury Prize for Stage Design ceremony (Nov. 21, 2013)

From 1987 until 1995, three prizes, including the overall winner (OW), were awarded biennially.
Since 1997, four prizes are awarded biennially.

The following designers are awarded winners:

| Year | Winners | Judges | Commissioning Companies |
|---|---|---|---|
| 2019 | Sami Fendall (OW); TK Hay; Zoë Hurwitz; Rose Revitt | Lizzie Clachan; Katrina Lindsay; Rajha Shakiry | Birmingham Royal Ballet; Leeds Playhouse; Nuffield Southampton Theatres; Octagon Theatre, Bolton |
| 2017 | Basia Binkowska (OW); Khadija Raza; Eleanor Bull; Fin Redshaw | Tom Piper; Nicky Shaw; Rae Smith | Lyric Theatre, Hammersmith; Mercury Theatre, Colchester; Phoenix Dance Theatre; Unicorn Theatre and ENO |
| 2015 | Grace Smart (OW); Jen McGinley; Camilla Clarke; Philippa Brocklehurst | Sophie Jump; Tom Piper; Tom Scutt | Lyric Theatre, Belfast; Nuffield Southampton Theatres; Royal Court Theatre; Traverse Theatre, Edinburgh |
| 2013 | Ana Inés Jabares-Pita (OW); Florence de Mare; Madeline Girling; Alexander Ruth | Christopher Oram; Es Devlin; John Macfarlane | English Touring Opera; National Theatre of Scotland; Nottingham Playhouse; Scottish Dance Theatre (in association with V&A Dundee) |
| 2011 | Hyemi Shin (OW); Emma Bailey; Jemima Robinson; Sarah Beaton | Miriam Buether; Ian MacNeill; Jon Bausor | Lyric Theatre, Hammersmith; Royal Opera House (ROH); The Opera Group; Watermill Theatre, Newbury |
| 2009 | Aleš Valášek (OW); Samal Blak; Jean Chan; Ruth Sutcliffe | Katrina Lindsay; Bob Crowley; Nick Ormerod | Birmingham Opera Companya; Royal Theatre Northampton; Sound & Fury in collaboration with Fuel and Unicorn Theatre |
| 2007 | Garance Marneur (OW); Helen Goddard; Rhys Jarman; Tom Scutt | Tim Hatley; Anthony Ward; Jean Guy-Lecat | Headlong; The Opera Group; Hampstead Theatre; Tricycle Theatre |
| 2005 | Patrick Burnier (OW); Phil Brunner; James Cotterill; Hannah Clark | Tobias Hoheisel; Pamela Howard; Julian Crouch | Bristol Old Vic; Gate Theatre, Notting Hill; Nottingham Playhouse; Random Dance, Sadler's Wells |
| 2003 | Becs Andrews (OW); Crista Noel Smith; Ben Stones; Adam Wiltshire | Hildegard Bechtler; John Macfarlane; Vicki Mortimer | Actors Touring Company; Royal Theatre Northampton; The Opera Group; West Yorkshire Playhouse |
| 2001 | Moritz Junge (OW); Jessica Bergström; Max Jones; Nicholaos Zavaliaris | Lez Brotherston; Tom Cairns; Rae Smith | English Touring Theatre; Royal Court Theatre (J. B.'s commission realised at Soho Theatre); Welsh National Opera; Young Vic |
| 1999 | Miriam Buether (OW); Emma Cattell; Luke Hunt; Isla Shaw | Richard Hudson; Tim Hatley; Vicki Mortimer | English Touring Opera; Rambert Dance Company; Royal Lyceum Theatre Company, Edinburgh; Soho Theatre Company |
| 1997 | Yannis Thavoris (OW); Fiona-Marie Chivers; Stuart Nunn; Julie Watson | Kandis Cook; Richard Foxton; Ian MacNeil | The Bush Theatre; Spitalfields Market Opera/English Touring Opera; Second Stride/Phoenix Dance Company; Salisbury Playhouse |
| 1995 | Es Devlin (OW); Frank Gerssen; Agnes Treplin | Robin Cameron Don; Deborah MacMillan; Tanya McCallin | Mecklenburgh Opera; Octagon Theatre, Bolton; Traverse Theatre, Edinburgh |
| 1993 | Franziska Wilcken (OW); Scott Sellers; Lakis Yenethli | Tom Cairns; Nigel Lowery; Jenny Tiramani | Birmingham Royal Ballet; Gate Theatre, London; West Yorkshire Playhouse |
| 1991 | Angela Davies (OW); Lucy Bevan; Neil Irish | Deirdre Clancy; William Dudley; Jocelyn Herbert | Second Stride; Crucible Theatre, Sheffield; Opera North, Leeds |
| 1989 | Kenny MacLellan (OW); Tim Hatley; Neil Warmington | Alison Chitty; Bob Crowley; Antony McDonald with Dame Judi Dench DBE (2nd stage only) | National Youth Theatre of Great Britain; Rambert Dance Company; Théâtre de Complicité |
| 1987 | Patrick Connellan (OW); Sarah Ashpole; Demetra Maraslis Hersey | – | – |

== Website ==
- Official website
