= Ana Inés Jabares-Pita =

Spanish designer

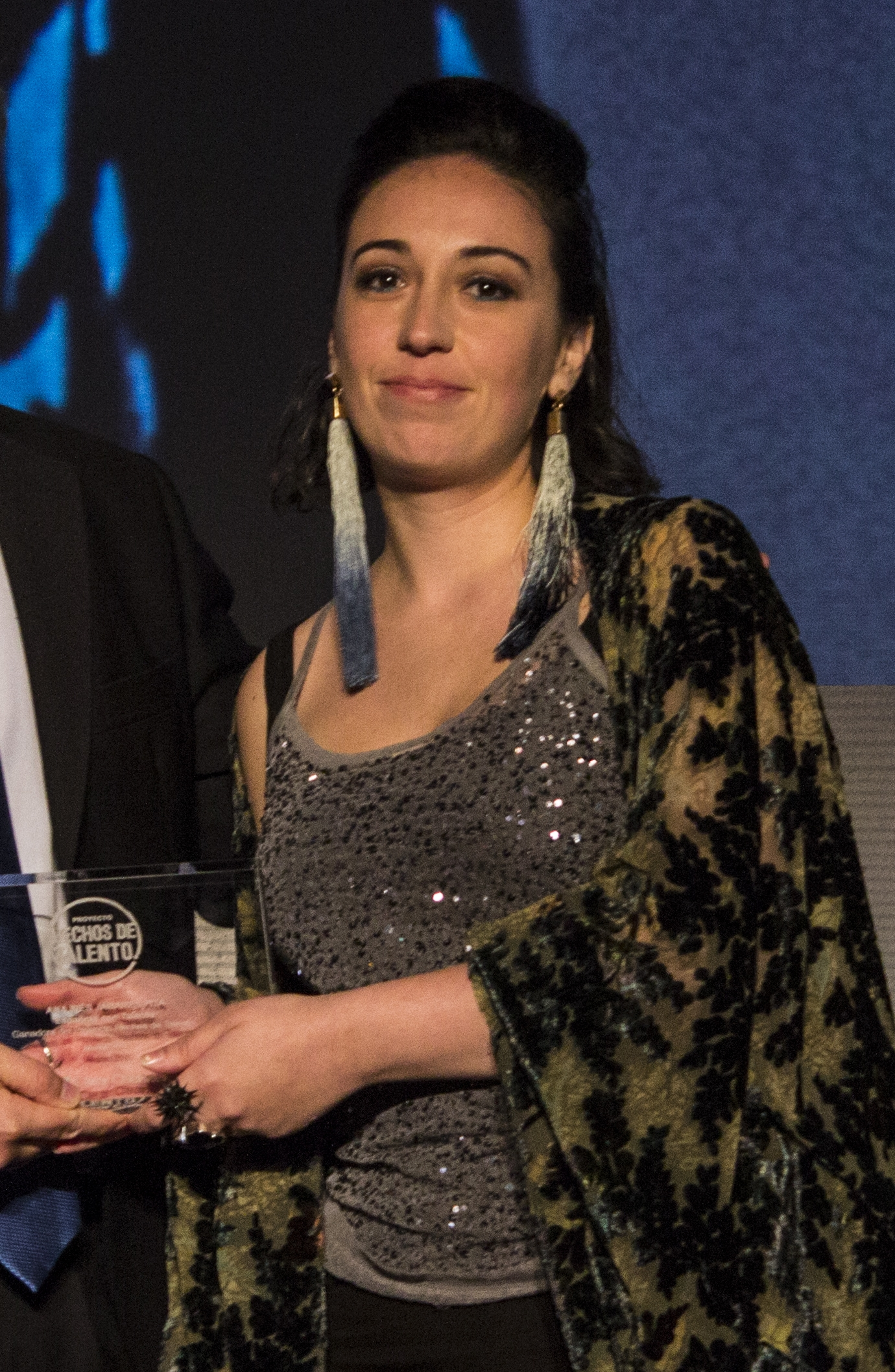
Ana Inés Jabares-Pita at the awards ceremony of Hechos de Talento in Madrid (2015)

Ana Inés Jabares-Pita (born January 21, 1987) is a Spanish designer working across opera, dance, theater, film, concerts and exhibitions.

== Education ==
Jabares-Pita was born in A Coruña, Galicia, Spain. As a teenager, she joined the Orquesta Sinfónica de Galicia choir as a soprano and performed in several shows. Aged 18, she moved to southern Spain to study fine arts at the University of Sevilla, while continuing her music studies. As part of her bachelor degree in fine arts, she spend one year at the Accademia di Belle Arti di Palermo in Italy, where classical music and opera sparked her interest in stage design. She continued her studies in London at the Royal Central School of Speech and Drama, where she finished a Master of Arts in scenography.

== Career ==
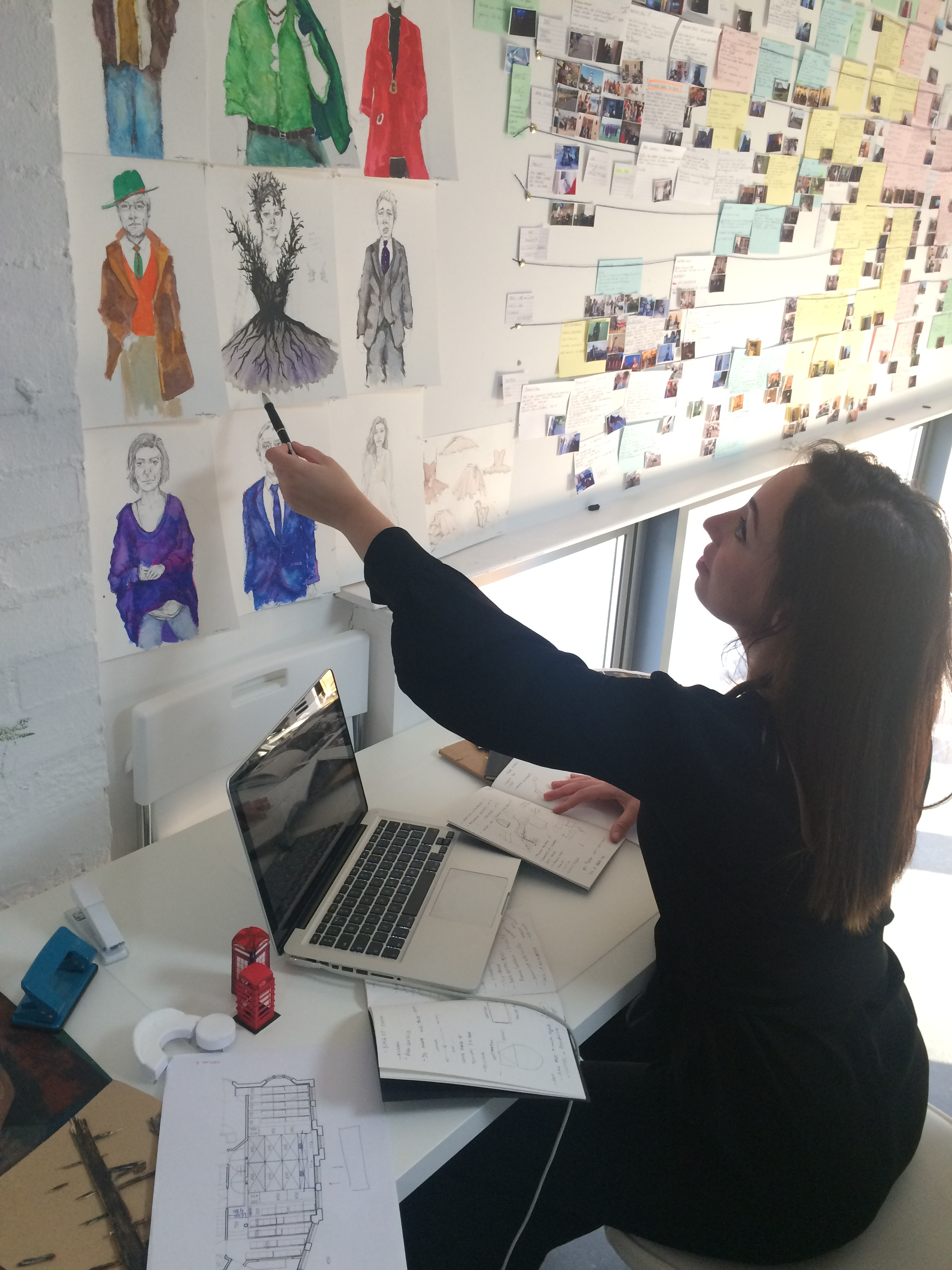
Jabares-Pita working in her studio.

In 2013, Jabares-Pita was declared 'overall winner' of the Linbury Prize for Stage Design for her design proposal of The Driver's Seat, a stage adaptation of Muriel Spark’s 1971 novella. Thanks to this award, she worked with Laurie Sansom, director of the National Theatre of Scotland, on this production at the Glasgow Tramway arts centre in 2015.

In 2015 she designed The Echo Chamber for the Young Vic in London, followed by Lela & Co (2015) for the Royal Court Upstairs, and Wish List (2016) for the Royal Exchange, Manchester.

She continued her work in Scotland, such as In Fidelity (2016) for the Traverse Theatre in Edinburgh, and designing Daphne Oram and the Wonderful World of Sound (Blood of the Young) (2017) at the Tron Theatre in Glasgow.

In 2018, she worked in several productions all around the UK, such as The Lovely Bones (2018) directed by Melly Still and adapted by Bryony Lavery after Alice Sebold (a Birmingham Repertory Theatre, Royal & Derngate, Northampton and Northern Stage co-production with Liverpool Everyman & Playhouse); the world premiere of the opera To See the Invisible (Aldeburgh Festival 2018); Twelfth Night (Royal Lyceum Theatre, Edinburgh, and Bristol Old Vic 2018), and Pride and Prejudice* (*sort of) (2018) at the Tron Theatre.

Jabares-Pita also did design work in art galleries such as Dulwich Picture Gallery and the V&A Museum, where her work on What Girls Are Made Of was selected to be part of their archive.

She has been one of the first Spanish stage designers to work at the Royal Shakespeare Company, where she designed set and costumes for Europeana (2020; part of the PROJEKT EUROPA season, currently suspended due to the COVID-19 pandemic) based on a novel by Patrik Ouředník, directed by Maria Aberg. Some of her most recent works include Blond Eckbert (2020; currently suspended due to COVID-19) for the English National Opera, and Faustus: That Damned Woman (2020) by Chris Bush, directed by Caroline Byrne (co-production Headlong, Lyric Hammersmith and Birmingham Repertory Theatre).

== Awards and achievements ==
Jabares-Pita's work has received the following awards and nominations.

- Awards
  - 2017 – Winner of the 'Best Studio Production' awarded by the Manchester Theatre Awards for Wish List.
  - 2016 – Winner of 'Spirit of Dundee Award' in 'Wearable Art' for her costume design of Ignis.
  - 2016 – Third Prize at the European Opera Prize. Proposal La Traviata, in collaboration with Max Hoehn.
  - 2015 – Winner in the category 'Design' of the initiative Hechos de talento. Jabares-Pita became 'Spanish Design Ambassador' representing Spanish design in some of the most emblematic places all over the world, such as Picadilly Circus (London) and Times Square (New York City).
  - 2013 – Overall Winner of Linbury Prize for Stage Design for The Driver's Seat for the National Theatre of Scotland.
  - 2013 – Best Design Award at the Ottawa Fringe Festival for Sappho...in 9 Fragments
- Nominations
  - 2015 – Finalist of James Menzies-Kitchin Trust Award (JMK Trust Award) with director Ben Hadley
  - 2015 – Finalist for 'Independent Opera Director Fellowship' with Dir. Rafael R. Villalobos
- Exhibitions
  - 2017 – World Stage Design exhibition (Taipei) – The Driver´s Seat
  - 2015 – Linbury Prize representation (The Driver’s Seat) at the Make/Believe exhibition at the V&A Museum in London 2015
  - 2015 – Representing Spanish Scenography in the Prague Quadriennal.
- Achievements
  - 2019 – Awarded an 'Artistic Residency" in Florida by E_{2}C (Escape to Create) to research the use of augmented reality, video games, and new technologies applied to painting, inspired by her previous experience on designing the set and costumes for the Inchcolm project.
  - 2019 – Artistic Residency in New York sponsored by the Spanish cultural action program 12 Miradas::Riverside, and developed by artistic director Carlos Quintáns with Laboratorio Creativo Vilaseco.
  - 2014 – Selected at the IV Encontro Artistas Novos-EAN 2014, Cidade da Cultura
  - 2012-2014 – Artistic residencies with Sleepwalk Collective, at Barbican Theatre London, Espazio Eszena, Bilbao and Vitoria
- Reception
  - Jabares-Pita's work has been commented by media in the UK. The Guardian included Lela & Co among the best ten theatre productions of 2015.
  - Idomeneus (2014) made her become a member of The Gate Theatre's Jerwood Young Designers. The same design was also selected by the V&A in London to become part of their archive.
