= Julie & Julia (soundtrack) =

Julie & Julia (Original Motion Picture Soundtrack)

Film score by Alexandre Desplat
- Released: August 4, 2009
- Recorded: 2009
- Studios: Legacy Recording Studios, New York City
- Genres: Film score; film soundtrack
- Length: 43:24
- Label: Sony Music
- Producer: Dominique Lemonnier

Alexandre Desplat chronology
Chéri (2009)	Julie & Julia (2009)	A Prophet (2009)

Julie & Julia (Original Motion Picture Soundtrack) is the film score to the 2009 film Julie & Julia directed by Nora Ephron starring Amy Adams and Meryl Streep. The film score is composed by Alexandre Desplat and released through Sony Music Entertainment on August 4, 2009.

== Background ==
Alexandre Desplat scored music for Julie & Julia and began working on the film during early-February 2009 amidst his multiple film scoring commitments. Desplat admitted scoring a comedy being difficult as he had to understand the limits and know when does the music become gimmicky or stupidly funny. Since both the stories, set in New York City and Paris being love stories, Desplat focused on the romantic side with the wit and lightness. Most of the time, the film's music is in a "gentle, soulful, Manciniesque mode". In 2021, Desplat considered the score to be his personal favorite as he tried to dwell into the clichés of France in the 1950s aided by an acoordinist to really play up to the traditional feel of that city.

== Reception ==
Jonathan Broxton of Movie Music UK wrote "In the bigger scheme of things, Julie & Julia is an inconsequential work. It’s by no means a highlight of Desplat’s career – it’s not even his best score of 2009 – but it’s yet another example of Desplat’s seemingly endless knack for writing enjoyable score after enjoyable score." Filmtracks wrote "this is a breeze of a soundtrack that extends beyond the usual primary appeal to Desplat collectors to reach a mainstream audience interested in a safe musical souvenir from the film that overflows with cheer." Dana Stevens of Slate wrote "The score by Alexandre Desplat can get overly expressive, earnestly underlining the pathos or humor of moments that were doing just fine on their own."

Kirk Honeycutt of The Hollywood Reporter wrote "Alexandre Desplat's whimsical score make the film's two worlds inviting." Richard Propes of The Independent Critic wrote "Alexandre Desplat's original score is vibrant yet balanced across the film's different decades". Richard Knight Jr. of Windy City Times called it a "jaunty score". Stephanie Zacharek of Time wrote "In places, Alexandre Desplat’s score makes Ephron’s job harder than it needs to be: Desplat has written some beautiful scores (most notably that for The Painted Veil), but here, as Julie does things like reminisce about her mother’s version of Julia’s boeuf bourguignon, he resorts to twinkly piano stuff that hangs in the air with the heaviness of Glade." Sukhdev Sandhu of The Daily Telegraph wrote "Alexandre Desplat’s rippling score add to the bonhomie".

== Track listing ==
No.	Title	Length
1.	"Julia's Theme"	02:13
2.	"Julie's Theme"	02:24
3.	"Great Big Good Fairy"	00:38
4.	"The Original French Chef Theme"	00:23
5.	"Starting Out"	02:45
6.	"What Should I Do?"	01:34
7.	"Eggs"	01:10
8.	"Psycho Killer"	04:22
9.	"A String Of Pearls"	01:28
10.	"Mes Emmerdes"	03:08
11.	"Time After Time" (Instrumental)	02:06
12.	"Burning The Stew"	00:57
13.	"Leaving Paris"	01:36
14.	"My Husband Left Me"	01:29
15.	"Stop The Train"	03:01
16.	"A Bushel And A Peck"	02:49
17.	"The New York Times"	02:38
18.	"Boeuf Bourguignon"	01:54
19.	"Julia Hates Me"	02:18
20.	"Last Supper"	01:17
21.	"Time After Time"	03:14
Total length:		43:24

== Personnel ==
Credits adapted from liner notes:

- Music composer, conductor and producer – Alexandre Desplat
- Producer – Dominique Lemonnier
- Compiler – Joe E. Rand, Steven Galloway
- Orchestrators – Alexandre Desplat, Bill Newlin, Clifford Tasner, Conrad Pope, Don Sebesky, Nan Schwartz
- Contractor – Sandra Park
- Recording and mixing – Dennis Sands
- Mastering – Patricia Sullivan
- Score editor – Todd Kasow
- Album coordinator – Tim Ahlering
- Copyist – JoAnn Kane, Mark Graham
- Design – Elizabeth Prochnow
- Executive producer – Nora Ephron
- Executive in charge of music for Columbia Pictures – Lia Vollack

Instruments

- Accordion – Myriam Lafargue
- Bass – Gail Kruvand, Jeff Carney, Kurt Muroki, Martin Wind
- Brass – Birch Johnson, Kyle Turner, Matt Muckey, Mike Davis, Ryan Keberle, Tony Kadleck
- Cello – Bruce Wang, Eileen Moon, Jeanne LeBlanc, Joel Noyes, Maria Kitsopoulos, Mary Wooten, Maureen McDermott, Melissa Meell, Mina Smith
- Drums – Shawn Pelton
- Guitar – Chuck Loeb, Frank Vignola
- Harp – Victoria Drake
- Percussion – Ben Herman, Dave Samuels, Erik Charlston, Joe Passaro
- Piano – Bill Mays
- Viola – Dawn Hannay, Irene Breslaw, Karen Dreyfus, Karin Brown, Michael Roth, Nick Cords, Becky Young, Robert Rinehart, Shmuel Katz, Vivek Kamath
- Violin – Ann Lehmann, Annaliesa Place, Cenovia Cummins, Duoming Ba, Liz Lim, Ellen Payne, Erica Kiesewetter, Erin Keefe, Eva Burmeister, Jeanine Wynton, Jennifer Kim, Jenny Strenger, Joanna Maurer, Joyce Hammann, Jung Sun Yoo, Katherine Fong, Kuan Cheng Lu, Laura Seaton, Lisa Kim, Matt Lehmann, Michael Roth, Minyoung Baik, Minyoung Chang, Nancy McAlhany, Natalia Lipkina, Ragga Petursdottir, Rob Shaw, Sein Ryu, Sharon Yamada, Suzanne Ornstein, Tom Carney, Vivienne Kim, Yurika Mok
- Woodwind – Kathleen Nester, Lawrence Feldman, Marc Goldberg, Mindy Kaufman, Nadine Asin, Steve Williamson

== Accolades ==
Awards	Date of ceremony	Category	Recipient(s)	Result	Ref.
BMI Film & TV Awards	May 20, 2010	Film Music Award	Alexandre Desplat	Won	
Hollywood Music in Media Awards	November 19, 2009	Best Original Score – Feature Film	Alexandre Desplat	Nominated	
International Film Music Critics Association	February 26, 2010	Best Original Score for a Comedy Film	Alexandre Desplat	Nominated	
World Soundtrack Awards	October 23, 2010	Soundtrack Composer of the Year	Alexandre Desplat	Won (Note: also for Fantastic Mr. Fox, The Twilight Saga: New Moon and The Ghost Writer)	
