= Tom Scutt =

British designer (born 1983)

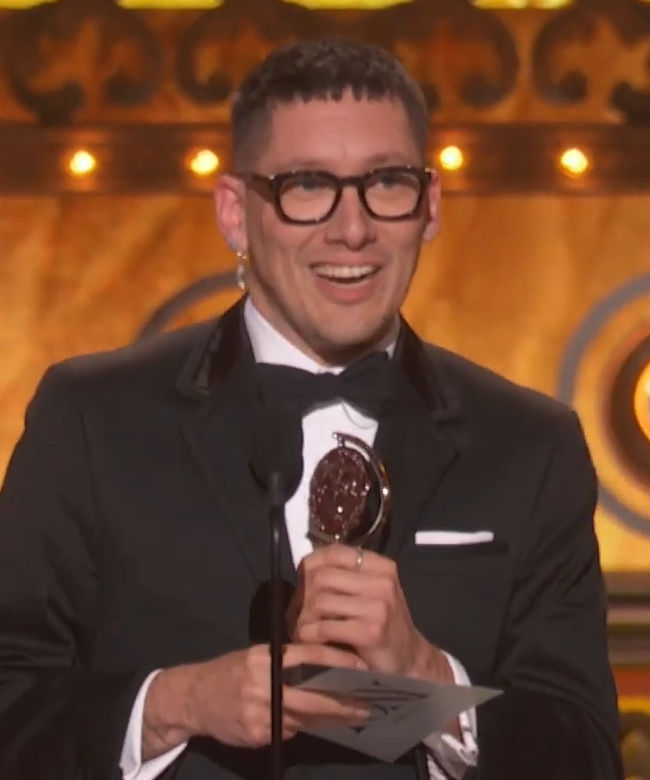
- Scutt in 2024, holding his Tony Award
- Born: 1983 (age 42–43); Epsom, Surrey, England
- Education: Royal Welsh College of Music & Drama
- Occupations: Theatre set and costume designer
- Notable work: King Charles III; Cabaret; Fiddler on the Roof; Into the Woods
- Partner: Jordan Fein
- Awards: 1 Olivier Award; 1 Tony Award; 3 Critics' Circle Theatre Awards
- Website: Official website

Tom Scutt (born 1983) is an English theatre set and costume designer. Scutt's work has appeared across the West End and Broadway. He has regularly collaborated with directors Rupert Goold and Rebecca Frecknall, and has worked with musicians Sam Smith and Pet Shop Boys in the past.

For his work on the 2021 West End revival of Cabaret at the Playhouse Theatre, Scutt received the Critics' Circle Theatre Award for Best Designer, which he also won for his work on A Very Expensive Poison and Into the Woods. When the same production of Cabaret transferred to Broadway in 2024, Scutt won the Tony Award for Best Scenic Design in a Musical. Scutt has received six Olivier Award nominations, including one win for Best Set Design for Fiddler on the Roof at Regent's Park Open Air Theatre.

== Family and education ==
Scutt was born in Epsom in Surrey, England in 1983. He attended The Chase School in Malvern, Worcestershire. Scutt graduated from the Royal Welsh College of Music & Drama in 2006, with a first-class degree in theatre design.

== Career ==
Scutt has worked on productions including King Charles III, Constellations, Fantastic Mr Fox, Jesus Christ Superstar, Cabaret, Fiddler on the Roof and Into the Woods, where his set design was described as "exquisitely conceived". For Cabaret, at both the Playhouse Theatre and the August Wilson Theatre, Scutt's immersive set design included a special side entrance for the audience to enter through, symbolising the "descent into the cabaret". He also designed the 2015 MTV Video Music Awards ceremony.

Scutt was set to design the London revival of Sunday in the Park with George, planned to run at the Barbican Centre in the summer of 2027. However, the production was cancelled in September 2026 after actors Ariana Grande and Jonathan Bailey dropped out.

== Recognition ==
Scutt has received the Jocelyn Herbert Award for Stage Design and the Linbury Prize for Stage Design, which he went on to judge eight years later. Scutt has also been appointed as an associate artist of the Donmar Warehouse.

=== Accolades ===
Award / Organisation	Year (Note: Indicates the year of ceremony.)	Category	Nominated work(s)	Result	Ref
Critics' Circle Theatre Awards	2019	Best Designer	A Very Expensive Poison	Won	
Critics' Circle Theatre Awards	2021	Best Designer	Cabaret	Won	
Critics' Circle Theatre Awards	2026	Best Designer	Into the Woods	Won	
Evening Standard Theatre Awards	2022	Best Designer	Cabaret	Won	
Laurence Olivier Awards	2022	Best Set Design	Cabaret	Nominated	
Laurence Olivier Awards	2022	Best Costume Design	Cabaret	Nominated	
Laurence Olivier Awards	2025	Best Set Design	Fiddler on the Roof	Won	
Laurence Olivier Awards	2025	Best Costume Design	Fiddler on the Roof	Nominated	
Laurence Olivier Awards	2026	Best Set Design	Into the Woods	Nominated	
Laurence Olivier Awards	2026	Best Costume Design	Into the Woods	Nominated	
Outer Critics Circle Awards	2016	Outstanding Costume Design	King Charles III	Nominated	
Tony Awards	2016	Best Costume Design in a Play	King Charles III	Nominated	
Tony Awards	2024	Best Costume Design in a Musical	Cabaret	Nominated	
Tony Awards	2024	Best Scenic Design in a Musical	Cabaret	Won	
WhatsOnStage Awards	2013	Best Set Designer	Constellations and The Lion, The Witch and The Wardrobe	Won	
WhatsOnStage Awards	2019	Best Set Design	Little Shop of Horrors	Won	
WhatsOnStage Awards	2019	Best Costume Design	Little Shop of Horrors	Nominated	

== Personal life ==
As of 2016, Scutt lived in East London. He identifies as queer and is in a relationship with theatre director Jordan Fein, who he has collaborated with professionally on numerous occasions.
