= Heroes and Villains =

1967 single by the Beach Boys

- U.S. picture sleeve

Single by the Beach Boys

from the album Smiley Smile
- B-side: "You're Welcome"
- Released: July 24, 1967
- Recorded: October 20, 1966 – June 14, 1967
- Studio: Western and Beach Boys, Los Angeles
- Genre: Progressive pop; psychedelic rock; progressive rock
- Length: 3:36
- Label: Brother/Capitol
- Songwriters: Brian Wilson; Van Dyke Parks
- Producer: The Beach Boys

The Beach Boys singles chronology
"Good Vibrations" (1966)	"Heroes and Villains" (1967)	"Wild Honey" (1967)

Licensed audio
- "Heroes and Villains" on YouTube

Audio sample
- file; help

"Heroes and Villains" is a song by the American rock band the Beach Boys from their 1967 album Smiley Smile and their unfinished Smile project. Written by Brian Wilson and Van Dyke Parks, Wilson envisioned the song as an Old West-themed musical comedy that would surpass the recording and artistic achievements of "Good Vibrations". The single was Brother Records' first release. While it failed to meet critical and commercial expectations, it was nevertheless a hit record, peaking at number 12 in the U.S. and number 8 in the UK.

The song was Wilson and Parks' first collaboration. Parks characterized the song as "historically reflective" and a "visual effort" that was meant to match the ballads of Marty Robbins. He said the lyrics were based on the early history of California, including references to the involvement of the Spanish and American Indians. Some accounts suggest that the song developed partly from a Wilson reworking of the standard "You Are My Sunshine". Early versions included sections with lyrics about farm animals ("Barnyard") and physical health ("I'm in Great Shape").

"Heroes and Villains" had the most complex making of any song in the band's history. Recording spanned virtually the entire Smile sessions as Wilson experimented with at least a dozen versions of the track, some of which ranged in length from six to eight minutes. Wilson discarded almost everything that was recorded, with expenses totaling around $40,000 (equivalent to $390,000 in 2025). Most of the final composite was produced in three days at his makeshift home studio. The chorus featured a theme that was cannibalized from another Smile track, "Do You Like Worms?".

Wilson's bandmates and associates later voiced dissatisfaction with the released version, believing that the mix was vastly inferior to his earlier, lengthier edits. Commentators blame the record's failure on the esoteric lyrics, the "muddy" sound quality, and the late timing of the release. It remains one of the lesser-known hit songs in the Beach Boys' catalog. For Wilson, the single's failure came to serve as a pivotal point in his psychological decline, and he adopted the song title as a term for his auditory hallucinations. In 2004, Wilson remade the song and its related pieces for Brian Wilson Presents Smile. In 2011, The Smile Sessions was released with an entire disc devoted to the song's original recording sessions.

== Background ==
Wilson had been working on "Heroes and Villains" for some time before he asked Parks to be his lyricist in mid-July 1966. Al Jardine surmised that the song derived in part from the group's improvised scat singing exercises from early in the band's existence. In a 2000 interview, he stated, "We all became instruments for Brian's barbershop concept. He said, 'Let's all do this, let's sing this idea.' Carl would be one instrument, I'd be another. Mike would be another instrument. [...] With none of us really being players, we would just scat in the car going to a show or something or going to school, anywhere." Musician Al Kooper, writing in his 2008 autobiography, recalled that Wilson played him a rough mix of "Heroes and Villains" shortly after the release of Pet Sounds. Kooper remembered that the song had "evolved, I believe, from a Wilson revamping of 'You Are My Sunshine.'"

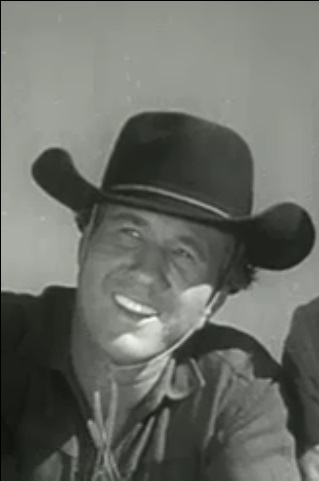
"Heroes and Villains" was partly inspired by the ballads of singer Marty Robbins (pictured 1957)

"Heroes and Villains" was the first song that Wilson and Parks wrote together. As with the others that they wrote for the Smile album, Parks wrote the words while Wilson composed the music. When presented the descending melody at the initial writing session, occurring a few days after their first meeting, Parks was reminded of the Marty Robbins' 1959 song "El Paso" and immediately conceived the opening line: "I've been in this town so long that back in the city I've been taken for lost and gone and unknown for a long, long time."

Wilson told Parks that he had thought of the Old West when conceiving the melody. Journalist Domenic Priore speculated that Wilson may have based the verses on Phil Spector's productions of "River Deep - Mountain High" and "The Bells of St. Mary's" – particularly the former's bass line. Asked in 2004 about the influence of George Gershwin's Rhapsody in Blue on the recurring melodies and themes on Smile, Wilson responded: "A little bit, not much. It influenced 'Heroes & Villains' and a couple of others." (Note: In a scene from the 2004 documentary Beautiful Dreamer: Brian Wilson and the Story of Smile, Wilson plays a piano version of "Rhapsody in Blue" that segues into "Heroes and Villains".) He credited Parks with some of the music and arrangement on "Heroes and Villains".

In Parks' recollection, all but one section of "Heroes and Villains" was written entirely "in one sitting". The success of the pair's collaboration led to them writing more songs with an Old West theme, including "Barnyard" and "I'm in Great Shape". It became an integral track for the Smile project and, later, was often called the album's "centerpiece". Wilson envisioned "Heroes and Villains" as a three-minute musical comedy that would surpass his achievements with "Good Vibrations". In a 1977 radio interview, he offered an anecdote in which he told his father, Murry that he was going "'to make a record that's better than 'Good Vibrations', something that you could never do. I don't know why in the hell I said that."

In a self-penned 1969 article, former band associate Michael Vosse wrote that, during one night at Wilson's home, Wilson played a past-tense variation on "You Are My Sunshine" on piano that deviated into "this weird little riff". Vosse said, "And it hit him, man, right then that he wanted a barn yard—he wanted Old MacDonald's farm—he wanted all that stuff. So he immediately got Van Dyke over and they did a chart for 'You were my sunshine'". Although Vosse admitted that his memory may be wrong, since Wilson "changed things so much", he recalled that the arrangement then "developed into an instrumental thing with barnyard sounds—people sawing—he had people in the studio sawing on wood—and Van Dyke being a duck—and it was marvelous." Asked about Wilson's rendition of "You Are My Sunshine" in 2004, Parks could not remember having been involved with it.

== Lyrics ==
To me, "Heroes And Villains" sounds like a ballad out of the Southwest. That's what it was intended to be—as good as any of those—and, really, to be a ballad. This Spanish and Indian fascination is a big chapter in Californian history, and that's what it's supposed to be—historically reflective, to reflect this place. I think it did it.

— Van Dyke Parks, 2004

There are conflicting reports regarding who came up with the title. Wilson credited Parks with naming the song, but Parks denied this, saying that he wrote the lyrics around the title that Wilson had suggested. Wilson's then-wife Marilyn commented: "There are so many screwed-up people in the music industry. The good guys and the bad guys [...] That's one thing Brian had in mind when they did 'Heroes and Villains.'" Biographer Peter Ames Carlin interpreted the song as Wilson projecting "all of the feelings sensed inside of himself [...] into vibrantly colored, abstract glimpses into another parallel world."

In Carlin's interpretation, the song describes "a lawless boomtown somewhere out on the fringes of the Old West" as told from the perspective of a narrator who "speaks as a man who has become a part of the scene, but not of it, exactly, because he's still so thrilled and terrified by everything he sees." At the song's conclusion, the protagonist "has aged and seen his children grow to adulthood" without knowing if his experiences have turned him into a hero or a villain.

Alternative versions of the song tell a different narrative, as Stylus Magazine's Ed Howard writes, "'Heroes & Villains' told a story, though the actual narrative changed depending on what sections were being added or discarded at any given time." In reference to "I'm in Great Shape", Parks commented: "it's interesting how [in the lyrics] there was, all of a sudden, this turning to eggs and grits. It's because it had something to do with the thought of a barnyard, and that related to that place we were trying to come up with in 'Heroes And Villains'. All those lyrics were visual efforts."

Contrary to a popular rumor, the song was not written about the nascent war in Vietnam. Parks said the lyrics were actually centered around an American Indian "thing" in which he and Wilson "were trying to exculpate our guilt, to atone for what we had done to the aborigines of our own place. There's a lot of things about belief in Smile, and its very question of belief is what was plaguing Brian at that time. What should we keep from the structure that we had, the hard-wiring that we had with religion?" Historian Keith Badman speculated that the "you're under arrest" line from an earlier version of the song may have been inspired by Wilson witnessing an attempted burglary of his Rolls-Royce.

Frank Holmes' illustration for the song: "The rain of bullets eventually brought her down".

Artist Frank Holmes, who designed the Smile cover artwork, created an illustration that was inspired by the song's lyrics: "The rain of bullets that eventually brought her down". Along with several other drawings, it was planned to be included within a booklet packaged with the Smile LP. Holmes shared a summary of his design choices in Domenic Priore's 2005 book Smile: The Story of Brian Wilson's Lost Masterpiece. Holmes recalled of the illustration, "the poultry in the right corner is saying, 'Dude'll do,' a reference to a line in the original lyrics: 'She was unafraid of what a dude’ll do in a town full of heroes and villains.' Van Dyke tells me that Brian saw that image and actually got the other Beach Boys to change their singing to ‘Dude’ll do’, based on this. So there's a case of the drawing definitely influencing the work."

== Production ==
=== Overview ===
"Heroes and Villains" had the most complex making of any song in the band's history, with dozens of sections and themes recorded for the track. Approximately 30 session dates were devoted to the song. Recording spanned virtually the entire Smile sessions, with the total production costs estimated at $40,000 (equivalent to $390,000 in 2025), a sum that was possibly three to four times greater than that for "Good Vibrations". Wilson also worked on and revised "Heroes and Villains" more than any other track for the LP. He experimented with myriad versions of the song, some of which ranged in length from six to eight minutes. Numerous rough mixes were completed, including at least four substantially different versions. It is the only track on Smile in which Wilson recorded vocals before the different sections of the song was assembled. Wilson said it was also the only song he ever produced in which the bass drum was the backbeat. "Great boom boom. People across the street were saying, 'Hey—whatever you're doing sounds great!' Thank you very much!"

Some sections that were recorded for "Heroes and Villains" were, at one point, slated to be dedicated songs of their own. In the 1970s, Wilson told biographer Byron Preiss that there was intended to be a piece called the "Barnyard Suite", which would have been "four songs in four short pieces, combined together, but we never finished that one. We got into something else." (Note: A track called "The Barnyard Suite" was mentioned in an article about Smiley Smile from 1967.) The only consistent element among the many versions of "Heroes and Villains" was that the song began with the "I've been in this town ..." verse. From there, the rest of the track was constantly revised. Journalist Peter Doggett commented, "The shifts of melody and tempo are so dramatic that virtually anything could have been considered part of that song; in Brian Wilson's mind, virtually anything was."

Vosse recalled that "there must have been a dozen versions. The best version I heard, which was never completed, but at least I could see the form of it, was an A side B side version lasting about six minutes. It was a beautifully structured work; and Van Dyke was still very involved." Wilson later denied that he had ever planned to issue the song in this form. In 2006, Carlin reported that a rumored 11-minute edit had yet to be found. In 2013, an acetate containing an early mix of the song was discovered. It indicated that Wilson had experimented with incorporating recorded sections of "I'm in Great Shape" into the projected "Heroes and Villains" single.

One of Wilson's "Heroes and Villains" recording experiments was, according to journalist Nick Kent, directly inspired by his emerging struggles with auditory hallucinations. Kent wrote that, during a session, Wilson attempted to recreate a "ghoulish" voice in his head by "taking a tape of some acappella Beach Boys vocal horse-play and slowing it down until it was just this vast swamp-like groan of terror. It was the scariest sound of anything he created for Smile ..." In the September/October 1967 issue of Crawdaddy!, journalist and magazine founder Paul Williams reported that Wilson had significantly reconfigured the song after hearing the Beatles' own psychedelic album Sgt. Pepper's Lonely Hearts Club Band, and that the song "originally had a chorus of dogs barking".

=== Early sessions (May–November 1966) ===
On May 11, Wilson went into Gold Star Studios and recorded an instrumental take of "Heroes and Villains" with a 2:45 runtime. According to Badman, the session was conducted as an experiment and was not a full-fledged recording. It is one of the many recordings of the songs that have since been presumed missing or lost. (Note: Other missing tape reels date from tracking sessions held on December 19, 1966, January 20, and March 2, 1967 ("Part II Insert"), as well as vocal sessions held on December 13, December 22 ("insert overdub"), December 27–28, 1966 (Brian-only overdubs), and January 20, January 31, February 3, February 24, and February 26, 1967. According to The Smile Sessions sessionographer Craig Slowinski, "It is possible the missing 1967 dates represent additional work on previously existing masters.") According to journalist Domenic Priore, this early take may have included a section that quoted "You Are My Sunshine". Engineer Chuck Britz told Preiss that "Heroes and Villains" was "as big if not bigger than 'Good Vibrations' in its original form. I thought it was a fantastic song, a great, rich full sound. [...] We had our basic unit-an organ, drums, basses, and guitars. Mostly everything we did had the same amount of basic instrumentation. I think there was a harpsichord in the back of the room and a harp played by Mike’s sister, Maureen."

"Heroes and Villains" piano demo
An excerpt of a demo, recorded on November 4, 1966, in which Wilson demonstrates "I'm in Great Shape" and "Barnyard" as sections of "Heroes and Villains".

"Barnyard" and the backing track verses of "Heroes and Villains" were both recorded on October 20, 1966, at Western Studio. "Barnyard" featured animal noises roared by Wilson's Smile coterie, including singer Danny Hutton and his girlfriend June Fairchild. A session for "I'm in Great Shape" followed on October 27. (Note: According to Slowinski, an earlier vocal session for "I'm in Great Shape" with all six Beach Boys was logged on October 17, "but no tape bearing that description has turned up in a search of Capitol and BRI vaults... although there's a chance the VEGETABLES 'Corncuopia' demo MAY have been recorded at that session (the master # assigned to that session's product was #56728).") On the recording, Wilson experimented with a tape delay effect that looped the audio signal back into itself cumulatively at a high gain level to create an "explosion" of sound. (Note: He returned to this effect on another section of "Heroes and Villains" recorded in early 1967.) On November 4, Wilson recorded a piano demonstration of "Heroes and Villains" that included "I'm in Great Shape" and "Barnyard" as sections of the song. Parks and KHJ DJ Humble Harve Miller are also featured on this recording – the former providing animal sounds.

On November 14, Wilson recorded "My Only Sunshine", a medley of the standards "The Old Master Painter" and "You Are My Sunshine". The renditions are relatively short. In 2005, Wilson wrote that the rendition of "The Old Master Painter" was brief because he could not remember the full song. During the recording, Wilson remarked that the session players should play as though they're far away, as the lyric suggests. Reflective of the spiritual themes recurring throughout the Smile songs, "The Old Master Painter" is a song that evokes God in its lyrics. "You Are My Sunshine" ends with a string section descending to a low discordance where Brian used the adjectives "snappy" and "draggy" to instruct session players. The master take for "You Are My Sunshine" was spliced out of the original reel so that Dennis Wilson could add a lead vocal. In 1968, a mono mixdown of the tape was created, but as of 2004, the original master had gone missing from the band's archives.

=== Delays and further recording (December 1966 – March 1967) ===
Smile was first projected for a December 1966 release date. On December 15, Wilson informed Capitol A&R director Karl Engemann that the album and its lead single "Heroes and Villains" would probably be delivered "some time prior to January 15". He attempted to ease Capitol's concerns over the album's delay by delivering a handwritten note that contained an unordered, preliminary track listing. "I'm in Great Shape" and "The Old Master Painter" were both listed as a separate track from "Heroes and Villains". Capitol delayed the release date of Smile and "Heroes and Villains" to March 1967. Possibly due to their insistence on a ready single, Wilson returned to work on "Heroes and Villains" on December 19, 1966, after which he halted work on most of the album's other tracks until April 1967. According to former band associate David Anderle, in December 1966, Wilson was unable to decide if "Heroes and Villains" should be the single.

By the start of 1967, the Smile recording sessions were marked by tension, a contrast from the joyous atmosphere that began the project. In one section of "Heroes and Villains", Wilson instructed his bandmates to crawl on the floor of the studio and make pig-like snorting sounds. Jardine remembered, "You hear a bunch of snorting and swining... It was like being trapped in an insane asylum. I was emotionally depressed by a lot of that stuff ..." On January 3, a module of "Heroes and Villains" called "Do a Lot" was recorded. A surviving tape of this session includes a remark from Wilson saying, "If there's not anymore cooperation of this, I'm splitting, I mean it. We better get back into the groove, you know?" "Do a Lot" was later reconfigured as "Mama Says" and briefly as a section of "Vega-Tables". Similarly, on January 27, a section called "All Day" was recorded. Also known as "Love to Say Dada", it later evolved into "Cool, Cool Water". At some point, Wilson began considering "Bicycle Rider", a module from "Do You Like Worms?", for inclusion in the structure of "Heroes and Villains".

"Cantina"–"Children Were Raised"–alternate verse–"Whistling Bridge"
An excerpt of various outtakes used for an alternate edit of "Heroes and Villains" created on February 10, 1967.

On February 10, Wilson completed a mix of "Heroes and Villains", later known as the "Cantina" version, that ended with a coda extracted from "My Only Sunshine". (Note: Older published materials mistakenly refer to the coda as "Barnyard".) Wilson soon discarded this version and the master tape was later lost, leaving just a safety copy of the mix. On February 16, Richard Goldstein reported in the Village Voice that the forthcoming single had "five movements, each with a distinct melodic and rhythm line." On February 18, journalist Tracy Thomas reported in the NME that "Heroes and Villains" would be released once Wilson decides on the contents of the single's B-side. She quoted Wilson as saying that he wanted to "keep as much of Smile a surprise as possible. I may end up just recording me and a piano. I tried it last night in the studio. It would be an interesting contrast, anyway."

Work on the song continued throughout February and March. At the end of February, the band launched a lawsuit against Capitol that sought neglected royalty payments and a dissolution of their contract with the label. Following this, Wilson announced that the album's lead single would be "Vega-Tables", a song that he had yet to start recording.

=== Parks' departure and hiatus (March–May 1967) ===
"Heroes and Villains" sent me on a whole trip. I couldn't do it. [...] I went on a two-month bummer over that record.

— Brian Wilson, 1995

On March 2, 1967, after a session for "Heroes and Villains", Wilson and Parks ran into disagreements, possibly over lyrics, and temporarily dissolved their partnership. On March 18, KMEM in San Bernardino conducted a radio survey that reported that Wilson was busy preparing "Heroes and Villains" and Smile, "and he's informed the Capitol bosses that he doesn't intend to 'hold back' on these projects." On March 21, band publicist Derek Taylor reported in his weekly column for Disc & Music Echo, "Only a scoundrel would dispute the claim that 'Heroes and Villains' is the most famous single not yet recorded. [...] it is a fact that the single, at the time of writing, is not completed and many people here are troubled. But Brian Wilson is not one of them."

In April, Wilson paused work on "Heroes and Villains" to focus on "Vega-Tables" for two weeks. Parks' last recorded appearance on the album's sessions was for a "Vega-Tables" date on April 14, after which Wilson took a four-week break from the studio.

On April 29, Taylor announced in Disc & Music Echo that "All the 12 songs for the new Beach Boys album are completed and [...] there are plans to release the album on a rush-schedule any moment." That same day, a Taylor-penned press release, published in Record Mirror and NME, revealed that "Heroes and Villains" was delayed due to "technical difficulties". On May 6, Taylor announced that Smile had been "scrapped" by Wilson. On May 11, Wilson returned to work on "Heroes and Villains" for a single session. On May 14, Carl Wilson stated at a press conference in Holland that "Vega-Tables" would probably be released as a single instead of "Heroes and Villains".

=== Smiley Smile remake (June–July 1967) ===
By June, Brian had declared to his bandmates that most of the material recorded for Smile was now off-limits and that he wanted to rerecord "Heroes and Villains" from scratch. Vocal and instrumental tracking on the song lasted from June 12 to 14 at Wilson's makeshift home studio, representing a dramatic contrast from his previous working methods. According to the group's statements to the press, they abruptly dropped out of headlining the Monterey Pop Festival that weekend because of commitments to deliver the "Heroes and Villains" single to Capitol.

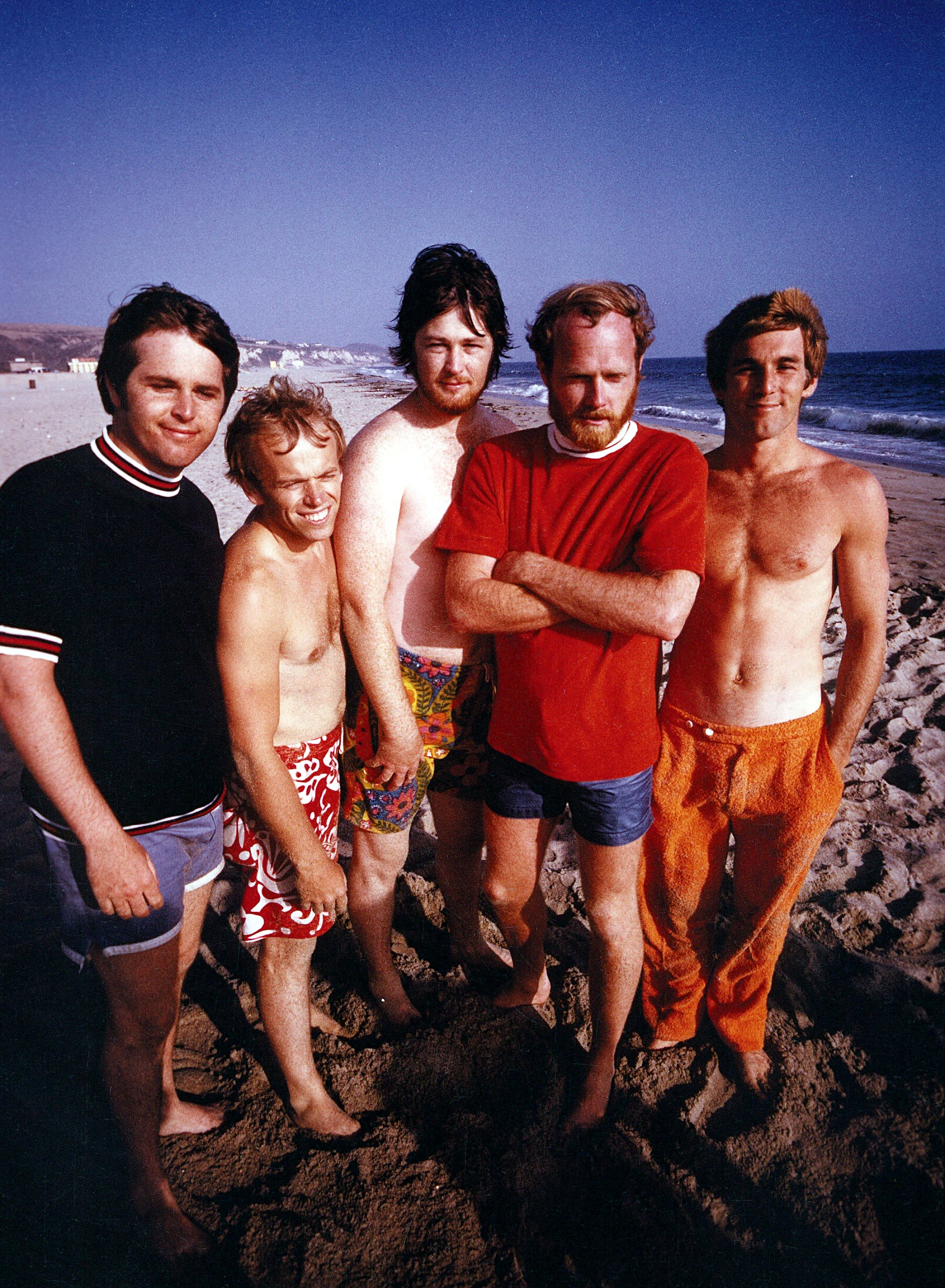
The group at Zuma Beach in Malibu, July 1967

Biographer Steven Gaines wrote that "Heroes and Villains" was the only track prepared for the forthcoming Smiley Smile album that Wilson "really cared about". Jim Lockhert, the engineer for the Smiley Smile sessions, recalled: "We had the complete song, but they just wanted to use part of it. Brian wanted to change what had been done on the rest of it. I think he wanted instrumentally and vocally to make it more complex. I think he wanted to finish the song, it was a challenge to him." Like many of the other tracks on Smiley Smile, Wilson used his recently acquired Baldwin theatre organ on the track. On some parts of the recording, the band used Wilson's swimming pool as an echo chamber.

The final overdubs were recorded around late June or early July. On July 22, Mike Love played a version of "Heroes and Villains" for NME's Keith Altham, who reported, "His particular tape ran for about six minutes. The harmonies and melodies are as intricate as one would expect. The number sounds like a combination of 'Good Vibrations', 'God Only Knows' and 'I Just Wasn't Made for These Times'."

After a brief period spent re-mixing and editing the song, the record was completed with a runtime of three minutes and 36 seconds. The only remnant of the earlier Smile recordings that made it into the final edit was portions of the backing track that had been recorded in October 1966. The final edit featured a complex vocal arrangement, unusual formal juxtapositions, tempo changes, and other novel elements. It starts at a fast tempo, alternates between a slower chorus, and at the end, shifts to an out-of-tempo a capella section that leads abruptly into the chorus fade-out.

The chorus featured a theme that was cannibalized from "Do You Like Worms?". According to Jardine, the "most important part of the song" was the change from E minor to A major, "The choruses repeat and you’d hear the theme repeated and repeated in the song. That’s very similar with what classical composers used to do, and that’s what I liked. I really enjoyed the recurring themes with different arrangements."

== Release ==
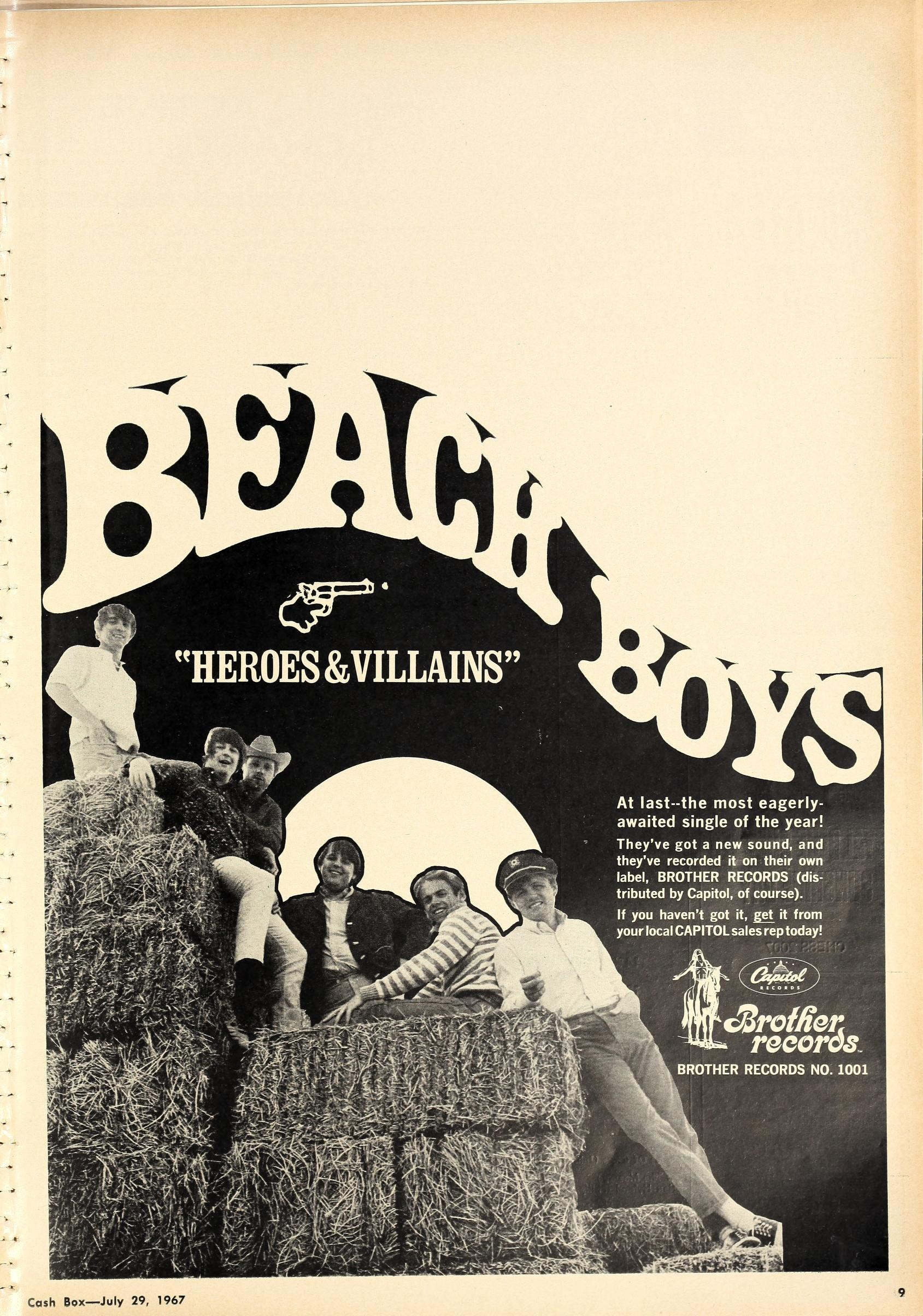
Advertisement for "Heroes and Villains", featured in Cashbox magazine in July 1967

Wilson held onto the final mix of the song for about a month. On the evening of July 11, 1967, he was told by his astrologer (a woman named Genevelyn) that the time was right for the record to be heard by the public. Without informing Capitol, Wilson called his bandmates and, accompanied by producer Terry Melcher, traveled by limo to personally deliver a vinyl cut of the record to KHJ Radio. According to Melcher, as Wilson excitedly offered the record for radio play, the DJ refused, citing program directing protocols. Melcher recalled: "Brian almost fainted! It was all over. He'd been holding onto the record [and] had astrologers figuring out the correct moment. It really killed him. Finally they played it, but only after a few calls to the program director or someone, who screamed, 'Put it on, you idiot!' But the damage to Brian had already been done."

"Heroes and Villains" was among the most highly publicized singles in the history of rock music. Issued on July 24, (Note: Other sources give July 31 as the release date.) it was the first release on the Beach Boys' Brother Records and failed to match the commercial success of "Good Vibrations" by a considerable degree. It debuted on the Billboard Hot 100 at number 81 on August 6, peaked at number 12 around September 4, and dropped off the charts one week later. In Britain, the single was issued on August 18 and reached number 8 on the UK Singles Chart.

Filmmaker Peter Clifton compiled a music video of "Heroes and Villains" set to footage of surfers riding waves for the BBC. The clip aired on the network's Top of the Pops on August 31. (Note: It later appeared in Clifton's 1969 film collage Popcorn: An Audio-Visual Rock Thing.) On September 2, the BBC hired a film crew to shoot an official music video of the song that featured the group at Brian's home. The film was scheduled to air on Top of the Pops around September 21 but was later scrapped. On September 18, Smiley Smile was released with "Heroes and Villains" as the opening track. It was one of the album's two elaborately produced tracks (the other being "Good Vibrations").

== Contemporary critical response ==
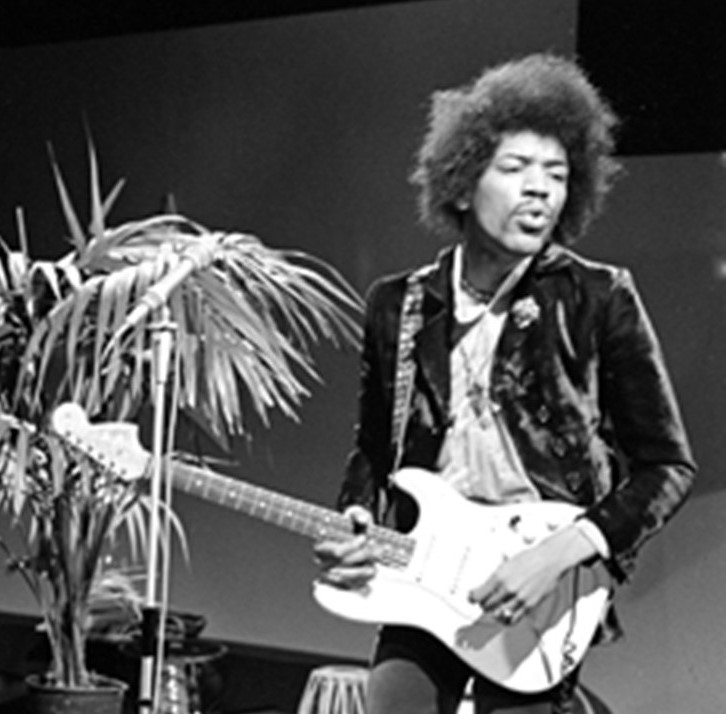
Jimi Hendrix dismissed the single as sounding like a "psychedelic barbershop quartet"

Critical reaction to the single was mixed. David Anderle later said that whatever new fans the group had brought with Pet Sounds were "immediately lost with the release of 'Heroes of Villains.'" In reference to the song, Jimi Hendrix told Disc & Music Echo: "Don’t particularly like the Beach Boys. Makes me think of a psychedelic barbershop quartet!" (Note: According to Steve Desper, "I spoke to Hendrix about how he liked the Beach Boys. He said he wasn't into surf music, but thought Brian was a musical genius.") Billboard reviewed it as "clever off-beat rock material with an arrangement that encompasses barbershop harmony and jazz!" Cash Box called it a "creatively delivered conglomeration of sounds that run the gamut from amusement park hooplah to barbershop harmony" and said that the lyrics "pose some interesting questions." Record World called it "a strange, appealing, harmonious song."

Bruce Johnston witnessed the record's debut at The Speakeasy Club in London. He recalled, "Everyone really got up to dance. But when the tempo changed, I knew we'd blown it with that record." Among British reviewers, Disc & Music Echo's Penny Valentine lamented that while she appreciated certain aspects of the song on repeated listens, "the record as a whole [...] is disappointing. [...] one has, perhaps, just come to expect too much from the Beach Boys. And this isn't it!" In his review for Melody Maker, Nick Jones praised the song as "another masterpiece of production from Wilson and another move in his flowery progression." New Music Review's critic described the song as "weirdly fascinating".

In an editorial published in December, Rolling Stone founding editor Jann Wenner referred to the song as "pointless" and a weak follow-up to "Good Vibrations". Music journalist Jules Siegel, who was present throughout the Smile sessions, reported in Cheetah that while it seemed like "the Beatles had outdistanced the Beach Boys" during the previous summer, "some people think ['Heroes and Villains'] is better than anything the Beatles ever wrote." At the end of the year, French radio listeners selected "Heroes and Villains" as the "Record of the Year".

== Impact on Wilson's decline ==
"Heroes and Villains" came to be cited as a factor in Wilson's professional and psychological decline. Badman stated that the dismal reception was the direct cause of Wilson's withdrawal from the public eye, while Howard offered that the pressure to follow up "Good Vibrations" with "an equally ingenious hit" likely contributed to the collapse of the Smile project. Doggett called the "saga" of the song's recording a "microcosm of the entire Smile tragi-comedy".

Jack Rieley, who managed the band in the early 1970s, stated that the failure of the single "shook [Brian] to the foundations of his being and self-respect. [...] this is when he started disappearing into his bedroom for a long time. This is when he ate himself into a state where he became horrendously fat." Marilyn said that Brian did not perform the song for anybody in the years following its release. (Note: During a 1973 interview, he performed the beginning of "Heroes and Villains" on piano and shifted to an "unfamiliar lyric and tune", explained by Wilson to be the song's full original version. Marilyn was astonished when told of the event.) In the 1998 documentary Endless Harmony, Love referred to "Heroes and Villains" as the last dynamic moment in Wilson's music. Journalist David Bennun concurred, "In a way, Love is right. Brian Wilson would never again generate something as thrilling as Heroes And Villains, or any of the other, numerous, breathtaking tracks he had constructed for the band in their so far brief career."

Wilson would sometimes refer to the voices in his head as "heroes and villains". Darian Sahanaja, a member of Wilson's supporting band since the 1990s, said that, "When I first met Brian, you couldn't even mention the words 'Heroes and Villains'; he’d turn around and walk away or he’d say, 'I don’t want to talk about it.'"

== Retrospective assessments ==
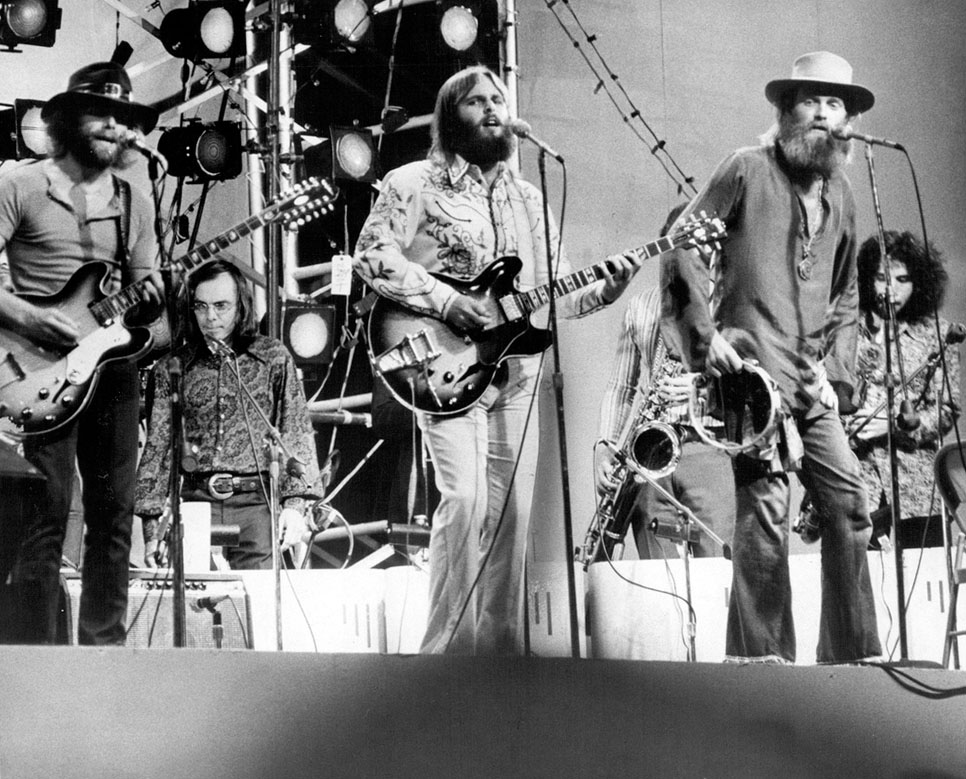
When the Beach Boys performed "Heroes and Villains" in the 1970s, they added the "Bicycle Rider" lyrics from "Do You Like Worms?".

Despite its relatively high chart placement, "Heroes and Villains" remains one of the lesser-known songs in the Beach Boys' catalog. It was one of the last Beach Boys singles to break the US top 20 until "Rock and Roll Music" in 1976. Jardine told an interviewer that Parks felt his contributions destroyed the band's commercial momentum: "Y’know, he actually apologized to me - for 'ruining my career.' I said, 'Van Dyke, not only did you not ruin it but you enhanced it! You enhanced our knowledge just by being there."

Wilson's bandmates did not feel that his final edit was as good as his earlier versions, and according to biographer David Leaf, "all those who heard the original" believed that the released version was missing crucial sequences that Wilson originally intended for the song. Jardine expressed dissatisfaction with the mix, describing it as "a pale facsimile" of Wilson's original vision, and suggested that Wilson restrained his efforts in the final edit. He blamed the record's lack of "sonic energy" on the limited recording equipment and felt that the mastering was probably engineered improperly, commenting, "I could hear the difference. I could hear the edge was gone." Parks was not involved with the making of the final edit and later said that he was "astonished" by its structure and production quality when he heard it on the radio.

Howard opined that the song was "more fractured" and "arguably more inspired" than "Good Vibrations", likening it to a "pocket opera" (a reference to the term "pocket symphony"). Eric Luecking of NPR said that while "Heroes and Villains" was more adventurous than "Good Vibrations", listeners could not relate to the song's lyrics, which obscured the single's legacy. Academic Larry Starr explained that the Wild West-themed subject matter "lacked any context whatsoever in the cultural environment of popular music in 1967, an environment immersed in the emerging counterculture and one that tended to prize lyrics with marked personal or social 'relevance.'" Doggett felt that while the song was "beautiful and intriguing", it was "nowhere near as commercial as 'Good Vibrations'."

Some commentators blame the shifts in contemporary pop culture for the record's failure. Starr disputed the suggestion; instead, the song's "relatively limited appeal may be ascribed to two factors that remained problematic, or sometimes even disappointing, in the Beach Boys’ output for the remaining years of the 1960s: the lyrics, and the production values." Considering the rich orchestrations of Pet Sounds, Starr concluded that "the source of biggest disappointment for listeners, however, may well have been the overall quality of the sound." Stebbins said that while the arrangement was "generously filled with fantastic Beach Boys vocal harmonies and genius musical twists and turns", the record's "disturbingly muddy sound quality [...] undoubtedly hurt its commercial appeal."

Despite some commentators criticisms of the song, "Heroes and Villains" has ranked highly in lists of the Beach Boys' greatest songs, and in some rankings of the greatest songs of all time. Mojo magazine named the song the 7th greatest by the Beach Boys, while the French edition of Rolling Stone ranked it 8th. Williams listed it as one of the 100 greatest rock singles of all time in his 1993 book Rock and Roll: The 100 Best Singles.

== Other versions ==
=== 1967 – Lei'd in Hawaii ===
In every recording group's career comes that moment when you realize you have a nuclear bomb on your hands. Right now, Brian Wilson, leader of the Beach Boys, is about to unleash his nuclear power and sing for you the song that went all the way to forty!

— Mike Love's mock-introduction of "Heroes and Villains", from an unreleased Lei'd in Hawaii tape

Before the release of Smiley Smile, the Beach Boys attempted to make a live album known as Lei'd in Hawaii. Due to technical difficulties, they decided to record the album at Wally Heider's Studio 3 on September 11, a session which included a runthrough of "Heroes and Villains". A surviving audio tape of this performance features an overdubbed spoken-word monologue, given by Mike Love, in which he ridicules the song. Carlin writes that the track was likely not intended for release as Love's rant shifts from "mock-serious to bitterly sarcastic" and "becomes even more barbed as he goes on". He surmised that another laughing voice in the audio belonged to Wilson, and that Wilson may have coordinated the recording himself.

The 2017 compilation 1967 – Sunshine Tomorrow includes this version of "Heroes and Villains", albeit with Love's monologue omitted. The band's concerts in Hawaii marked the last time Wilson sang "Heroes and Villains" before a public audience until 2001, when he performed the song at a Radio City Music Hall tribute concert held in his honor.

=== 2004 – Brian Wilson Presents Smile ===
Wilson's 2004 solo album Brian Wilson Presents Smile included new rerecordings of "Gee", "Heroes and Villains", "Barnyard", "The Old Master Painter", and "I'm in Great Shape". In this version, the discarded "Cantina" section was restored in "Heroes and Villains". Sahanaja recalled that the group had "already been performing a version of the song that incorporated the 'Cantina' section, and so Brian wanted to go with that structure for the recording."

An instrumental arrangement of "Cantina", written by Sahanaja, was added as an introduction to "I'm in Great Shape", the song which begins the album's third movement. This time, the "explosion" tape delay effect was created with a digital plug-in. According to Sahanaja, the placement of "I'm in Great Shape" in the running order "was probably a performance decision. I always felt that this song building into a feedback frenzy and breaking into 'I Wanna Be Around' and 'Workshop" was the disoriented, reality defying portion of the performance. Shaking things up and slightly derailing before getting back on track–as if a metaphor for life. It seemed to fit for those reasons."

=== 2011 – The Smile Sessions ===
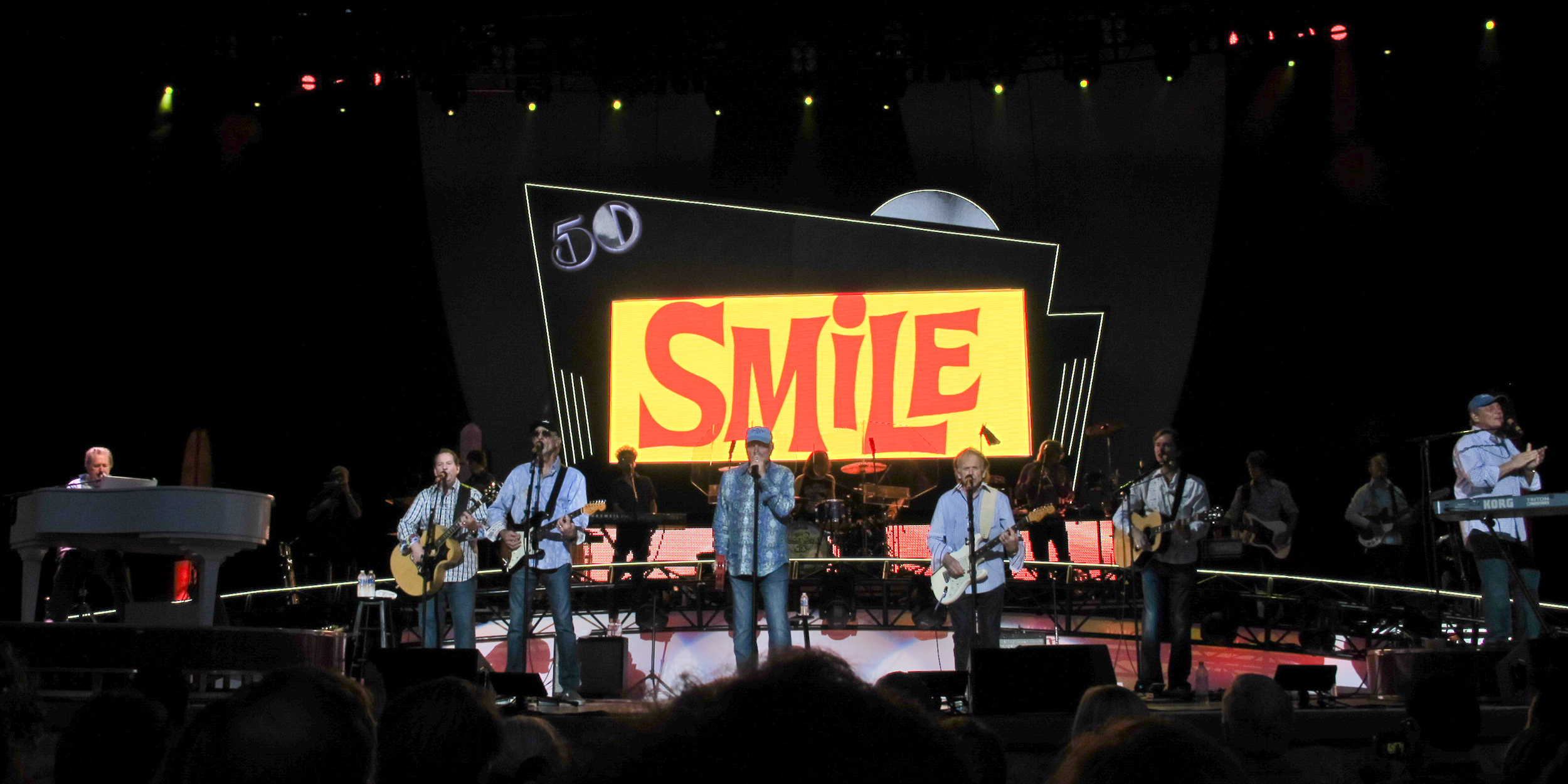
The Beach Boys performing "Heroes and Villains" in 2012, during their reunion tour

Released in 2011, The Smile Sessions compilation included a hypothetical version of the original album that was based on Wilson's 2004 version, albeit with a few changes in the sequencing. Among these revisions was the placement of "I'm in Great Shape", which became sandwiched between "Do You Like Worms?" and "Barnyard". Asked about this change, Sahanaja responded: "the tape session research shows that ['I'm in Great Shape'] was definitely part of the 'Heroes and Villains' variations, and so the decision [with The Smile Sessions] was to keep it within that context." The box set edition was packaged with two 7-inch vinyl records, one of which was a two-part edit of "Heroes and Villains" stretched across both sides. The edit was created by compilers Mark Linett and Alan Boyd.

Prior to the release of The Smile Sessions, in 1990, the "Cantina" mix was included on a "two-fer" reissue of Smiley Smile and Wild Honey. Many unreleased sections of the song were also compiled for the 1993 box set Good Vibrations: Thirty Years of the Beach Boys.

== Cover versions ==
- 1976 – The Residents, The Third Reich 'n Roll (as part of "Swastikas on Parade")
- 1997 – Forms, Smiling Pets
- 2000 – Malcolm Ross, Caroline Now!
- 2000 – Gary Usher, Add Some Music to Your Day: 1970 Symphonic Tribute to Brian Wilson (as "Fall Breaks and Back to Winter / Good Vibrations / Heroes and Villains")
- 2002 – Phil Madeira, Making God Smile
- 2004 – Geraint Watkins, Dial W for Watkins
- 2011 – Salyu, s(o)un(d)beams+ (as "Our Prayer ~ Heroes And Villains")

== In popular culture ==
In 2009, "Heroes and Villains" was used in Wes Anderson's animated film Fantastic Mr. Fox and also appeared on the soundtrack album and used in the Season 3 trailer from Prime TV Series, The Boys. It is also featured in the 11th episode of season 4 of the television series Mr. Robot ("eXit").

== Personnel ==
Per band archivist Craig Slowinski.

=== Single edit ===
The Beach Boys

- Al Jardine – harmony and backing vocals
- Bruce Johnston – harmony and backing vocals
- Mike Love – co-lead, harmony, and backing vocals
- Brian Wilson – lead, harmony, and backing vocals; tack piano (chorus), overdubbed harpsichord, Baldwin organ, overdubbed electric harpsichord; sandpaper percussion (uncertain credit)
- Carl Wilson – harmony and backing vocals
- Dennis Wilson – harmony and backing vocals

Guest

- Van Dyke Parks – tack piano (verse)

Session musicians (later known as "the Wrecking Crew")

- Gene Estes – slide whistle; shaker (uncertain credit), "clank" (uncertain credit)
- George Hyde – French horn
- Jim Gordon – drums
- Carol Kaye – acoustic rhythm guitar (uncertain credit)
- Bill Pitman – Danelectro six-string bass
- Lyle Ritz – upright bass

=== Partial sessionography ===
The details in this section are adapted from The Smile Sessions liner notes, which includes a sessionography compiled by band archivist Craig Slowinski, and from Keith Badman.

- May 11, 1966 – Gold Star (this session was taped over, and no copy of the recording from this date survives)
  - Hal Blaine – drums
  - Frank Capp – percussion and bells
  - Al Casey – electric guitar
  - Jerry Cole – electric guitar
  - Carol Kaye – Fender bass (uncertain credit)
  - Bill Pitman – Danelectro bass (uncertain credit)
  - Lyle Ritz – upright bass
  - Al De Lory – keyboards
  - Larry Knechtel – keyboards
  - Jim Horn – flute, tenor saxophone
  - Bill Green – clarinet, tenor saxophone
  - Jay Migliori – tenor saxophone, bass saxophone
  - Steve Douglas – tenor saxophone
- October 20, 1966 - Western ["Verse" and "Barnyard"] (this session produced the master take of the verse instrumental, and the discarded "Barnyard" section)
  - Gene Estes – slide whistle ("Verse", timpani on earlier takes), shaker ("Barnyard")
  - Jim Gordon – drums ("Verse"), conga with stick ("Barnyard")
  - Carol Kaye – acoustic rhythm guitar ("Verse", uncertain), lead guitar ("Barnyard", uncertain credit)
  - George Hyde – French horn
  - Tommy Morgan – bass harmonica
  - Van Dyke Parks – tack piano, animal sounds (uncertain credit)
  - Bill Pitman – Danelectro bass (uncertain credit)
  - Lyle Ritz – upright bass (arco in "Verse")
  - Brian Wilson – wordless vocals, animal sounds
- October 27, 1966 - Western ["I'm in Great Shape"] (this session produced the instrumental recording later used on The Smile Sessions)
  - Jay Migliori – tenor saxophone
  - Van Dyke Parks – piano with taped strings (celeste on earlier takes)
  - Dorothy Victor – harp
  - Brian Wilson – overdubbed Fender bass
- November 14, 1966 – Gold Star ["My Only Sunshine"] (this session produced the recording later used on The Smile Sessions)
  - Arnold Belnick – violin
  - Norman Botnick – viola
  - Joseph DiTullio – cello
  - Jesse Ehrlich – cello
  - Jim Gordon – drums, sticks (shaker on early takes)
  - Carol Kaye – acoustic rhythm guitar
  - Raymond Kelley – cello
  - Leonard Malarsky – violin
  - Tommy Morgan – harmonica
  - Alexander Nelman – viola
  - Jay Migliori – saxophone, clarinet
  - Bill Pitman – Danelectro bass
  - Diane Rovell – additional vocals (part two)
  - Joe Saxon – cello
  - Brian Wilson – lead vocal (part two)
  - Dennis Wilson – lead vocal (part one)
  - Marilyn Wilson – additional vocals (part two)
- January 3, 1967 - Columbia ["Do a Lot", "Bag of Tricks", "Mission Pak", "Bridge to Indians" "Part 1 Tag", and "Pickup to 3rd Verse"] (series of unused early modules recorded, "Do a Lot" eventually became a module of "Vega-Tables" and later "Mama Says")
  - Brian Wilson – vocals, upright piano ("Do a Lot" and "Bag of Tricks"), tack piano, overdubbed handclaps ("Part 1 Tag"), overdubbed grand piano ("Do a Lot"), overdubbed whistling ("Do a Lot", uncertain credit), overdubbed guiro, "choo-choo train" recorder, steam engine percussion, duck quack, noise maker, whistles, bells ("Bag of Tricks")
  - Dennis Wilson – vocals, overdubbed thump percussion ("Do a Lot", uncertain credit), bass drum and jug with mallet ("Bag of Tricks"), overdubbed handclaps ("Part 1 Tag"), overdubbed guiro, "choo-choo train" recorder, steam engine percussion, duck quack, noise maker, whistles, bells ("Bag of Tricks")
  - Carl Wilson – vocals, overdubbed handclaps ("Part 1 Tag"), overdubbed guiro, "choo-choo train" recorder, steam engine percussion, duck quack, noise maker, whistles, bells ("Bag of Tricks")
  - Mike Love – vocals, overdubbed guiro, "choo-choo train" recorder, steam engine percussion, duck quack, noise maker, whistles, bells ("Bag of Tricks")
  - Al Jardine – vocals, overdubbed guiro, "choo-choo train" recorder, steam engine percussion, duck quack, noise maker, whistles, bells ("Bag of Tricks")
  - Bruce Johnston – vocals, overdubbed guiro, "choo-choo train" recorder, steam engine percussion, duck quack, noise maker, whistles, bells ("Bag of Tricks")
  - unknown - French horn (early takes of Bag of Tricks)
  - unknown - French horn (early takes of Bag of Tricks)
- January 27, 1967 - Columbia ["Children Were Raised", "Part 2", "Whistling Bridge" and "All Day"] ("All Day" evolves into "Love to Say Dada" and later "Cool, Cool Water")
  - Brian Wilson – lead and backing vocals, thigh slap, overdubbed tack piano ("Children Were Raised"), tack piano ("Part 2"), vocals ("Bag of Tricks"), whistling ("Whistling Bridge", uncertain credit), piano with strings taped ("All Day")
  - Dennis Wilson – backing vocals, "brillo pad" percussion ("Children Were Raised") vocals ("Bag of Tricks"), whistling ("Whistling Bridge", uncertain credit)
  - Carl Wilson – backing vocals ("Children Were Raised"), vocals ("Bag of Tricks"), whistling ("Whistling Bridge", uncertain credit)
  - Mike Love – backing vocals ("Children Were Raised"), vocals ("Bag of Tricks")
  - Al Jardine – backing vocals ("Children Were Raised")
  - Bruce Johnston – backing vocals ("Children Were Raised")
- February 7, 1967 - Columbia ["Cantina"]
  - Gene Gaddy – "You're under arrest!" voice
  - Al Jardine – laughter and backing vocals
  - Bruce Johnston – laughter and backing vocals
  - Mike Love – lead vocals, laughter and backing vocals
  - Tommy Tedesco – overdubbed mandolins
  - Brian Wilson – lead vocals, laughter and backing vocals, tack piano
  - Carl Wilson – laughter and backing vocals
  - Dennis Wilson – laughter and backing vocals
- February 15, 1967 - Western ["Prelude to Fade" and "Piano Theme"] (main chorus theme, previously written as part of "Do You Like Worms", tracked for "Heroes and Villains" for the first time, "Prelude to Fade" used as the ending of the edit featured on The Smile Sessions)
  - Brian Wilson - tack piano ("Piano Theme")
  - Van Dyke Parks - piano with strings taped ("Prelude to Fade") tack piano ("Piano Theme")
  - Carol Kaye – acoustic rhythm guitar ("Prelude to Fade")
  - Ray Pohlman - fender bass ("Prelude to Fade")
  - Bill Pitman - danelectro bass ("Prelude to Fade")
  - Lyle Ritz - upright bass ("Prelude to Fade")
  - Hal Blaine - drums ("Prelude to Fade")
  - Gene Estes - temple blocks ("Prelude to Fade", played bicycle horn, bicycle bells, and siren on earlier takes)
  - Tommy Morgan - harmonica ("Prelude to Fade")
  - George Hyde - French horn with flutter ("Prelude to Fade")
  - Sid Sharp - violin ("Prelude to Fade")
  - William Kurasch - violin ("Prelude to Fade")
  - Jerome Reisler - violin ("Prelude to Fade")
  - Ralph Schaeffer - violin ("Prelude to Fade")
  - John (Vidor) Vidusich - violin ("Prelude to Fade")
  - Walter Wiemeyer - violin ("Prelude to Fade")
  - Norman Botnick - viola ("Prelude to Fade")
  - Alexander Nieman - viola ("Prelude to Fade")
  - Jesse Ehrlich - cello ("Prelude to Fade")
  - Joseph DiTullio - cello ("Prelude to Fade")
- February 20, 1967 - Columbia ["Gee"]
  - Al Jardine – vocals
  - Mike Love – vocals
  - Brian Wilson – vocals
  - Carl Wilson – vocals
  - Dennis Wilson – vocals
- March 1, 1967 - Western ["Verse Remake" and "Organ Waltz"] (discarded remake of the verse backing track and intro)
  - Gene Estes – temple blocks ("Verse Remake", rehearsals only) overdubbed recorder, whistle, slide whistle, buzzer, noise maker ("Organ Waltz")
  - Hal Blaine – drums ("Verse Remake")
  - Carl Wilson – electric rhythm guitar ("Verse Remake")
  - Carol Kaye – acoustic rhythm guitar ("Verse Remake", uncertain)
  - Ronald Benson – baritone ukulele with stick ("Verse Remake")
  - Van Dyke Parks – tack piano ("Verse Remake") hammond organ, overdubbed recorder, whistle, slide whistle, buzzer, noise maker ("Organ Waltz")
  - Bill Pitman – Danelectro bass ("Verse Remake") overdubbed recorder, whistle, slide whistle, buzzer, noise maker ("Organ Waltz")
  - Chuck Berghofer – arco upright bass ("Verse Remake")
  - Brian Wilson – organ bass pedals, grand piano, overdubbed recorder, whistle, slide whistle, buzzer, noise maker ("Organ Waltz")
  - Diane Rovell - overdubbed recorder, whistle, slide whistle, buzzer, noise maker ("Organ Waltz")
- June 12–14, 1967 - Bel Air ["Chorus Vocals", Children Were Raised Remake" and "Barbershop"] (most of the final single edit of the song recorded over these three days, including fragments originally intended for "Do You Like Worms")
  - Brian Wilson – backing and harmony vocals ("Chorus Vocals"), lead and backing vocals, electric harpsichord, overdubbed baldwin organ ("Children Were Raised Remake"), lead vocals ("Barbershop")
  - Dennis Wilson – backing and harmony vocals ("Chorus Vocals"), backing vocals ("Children Were Raised Remake")
  - Carl Wilson – backing and harmony vocals ("Chorus Vocals"), backing vocals ("Children Were Raised Remake")
  - Mike Love – backing and harmony vocals ("Chorus Vocals"), backing vocals ("Children Were Raised Remake"), lead vocals ("Barbershop")
  - Al Jardine – lead vocals ("Chorus Vocals"), backing vocals ("Children Were Raised Remake")
  - Billy Hinsche – backing and harmony vocals ("Chorus Vocals")

== Charts ==
Chart (1967)	Peak position
Finland (Suomen Virallinen)	38
New Zealand (Listener)	6
UK Record Retailer	8
US Billboard Hot 100	12

== Bibliography ==
- Badman, Keith (2004). The Beach Boys: The Definitive Diary of America's Greatest Band, on Stage and in the Studio. Backbeat Books. ISBN 978-0-87930-818-6.
- Carlin, Peter Ames (July 25, 2006). Catch a Wave: The Rise, Fall, and Redemption of the Beach Boys' Brian Wilson. Rodale. ISBN 978-1-59486-320-2.
- Carter, Dale (2017). "My Regeneration: "Heroes and Villains" and the Salvation of Brian Wilson Presents Smile" (PDF). Rock Music Studies. 4 (3). Aarhus University: 171–188. doi:10.1080/19401159.2017.1336377. S2CID 192834600.
- Crowley, Kent (2015). Long Promised Road: Carl Wilson, Soul of the Beach Boys: The Biography (1st ed.). London, England: Jawbone Press. ISBN 9781908279842.
- DeRogatis, Jim (1996). Kaleidoscope Eyes: Psychedelic Rock From the 1960s to the 1990s. Fourth Estate. ISBN 1-85702-599-7.
- Dillon, Mark (2012). Fifty Sides of the Beach Boys: The Songs That Tell Their Story. ECW Press. ISBN 978-1-77090-198-8.
- Doggett, Peter (1997). "Smile: The Great Lost Album". In Abbott, Kingsley (ed.). Back to the Beach: A Brian Wilson and the Beach Boys Reader. Helter Skelter. ISBN 978-1-90092-402-3.
- Gaines, Steven (1986). Heroes and Villains: The True Story of The Beach Boys (1st ed.). New York: Da Capo Press. ISBN 0306806479.
- Kent, Nick (2009). "The Last Beach Movie Revisited: The Life of Brian Wilson". The Dark Stuff: Selected Writings on Rock Music. Da Capo Press. ISBN 9780786730742.
- Leaf, David (1978). The Beach Boys and the California Myth. Grosset & Dunlap. ISBN 978-0-448-14626-3.
- Matijas-Mecca, Christian (2017). The Words and Music of Brian Wilson. ABC-CLIO. ISBN 978-1-4408-3899-6.
- Preiss, Byron (1979). The Beach Boys. Ballantine Books. ISBN 978-0-345-27398-7.
- Priore, Domenic, ed. (1995). Look, Listen, Vibrate, Smile!. Last Gasp. ISBN 0-86719-417-0.
- Priore, Domenic (2005). Smile: The Story of Brian Wilson's Lost Masterpiece. London: Sanctuary. ISBN 1860746276.
- Siegel, Jules (1997) [1967]. "The Religious Conversion of Brian Wilson: Goodbye Surfing, Hello God". In Abbott, Kingsley (ed.). Back to the Beach: A Brian Wilson and the Beach Boys Reader. Helter Skelter. pp. 51–63. ISBN 978-1-90092-402-3.
- Starr, Larry (2016). "A Listener's Smile". In Lambert, Philip (ed.). Good Vibrations: Brian Wilson and the Beach Boys in Critical Perspective. University of Michigan Press. ISBN 978-0-472-11995-0.
- Stebbins, Jon (2011). The Beach Boys FAQ: All That's Left to Know About America's Band. ISBN 9781458429148.
- Williams, Paul; Anderle, David (1995). "A Celebration of Wild Honey". In Priore, Domenic (ed.). Look, Listen, Vibrate, Smile!. Last Gasp. pp. 220–241. ISBN 0-86719-417-0.
- Williams, Paul, ed. (1997). Brian Wilson & The Beach Boys How Deep Is The Ocean?. Omnibus Press. ISBN 0711961972.
- Zollo, Paul (2016). More Songwriters on Songwriting. Hachette Books. ISBN 978-0-306-81799-1.
