= 2009 Los Angeles Film Critics Association Awards =

Annual US film awards ceremony

35th LAFCA Awards
- Date: December 14, 2009

Highlights
- Best Picture: The Hurt Locker

The 35th Los Angeles Film Critics Association Awards, given by the Los Angeles Film Critics Association (LAFCA), honored the best in film for 2009.

== Winners ==
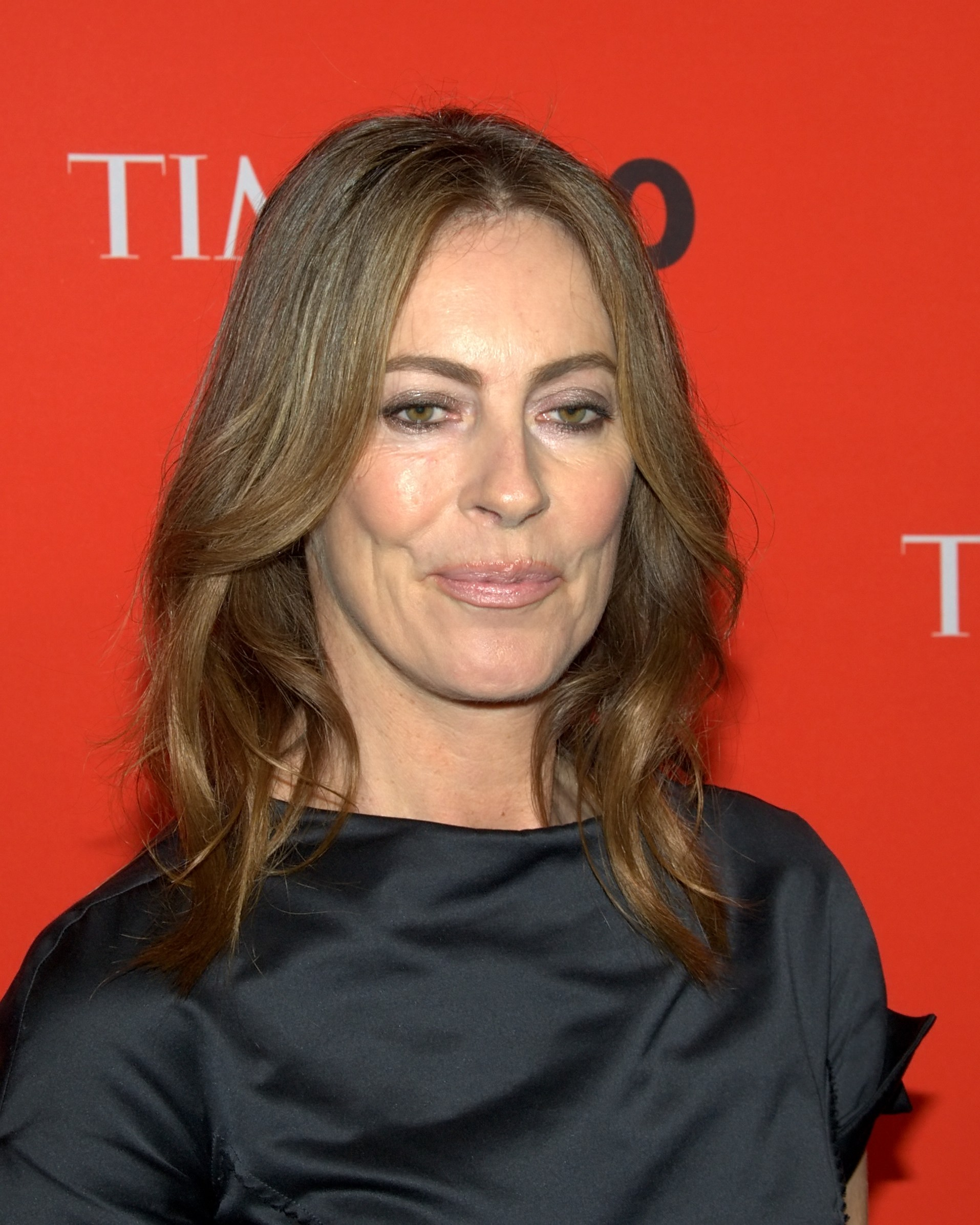
Kathryn Bigelow, Best Director winner

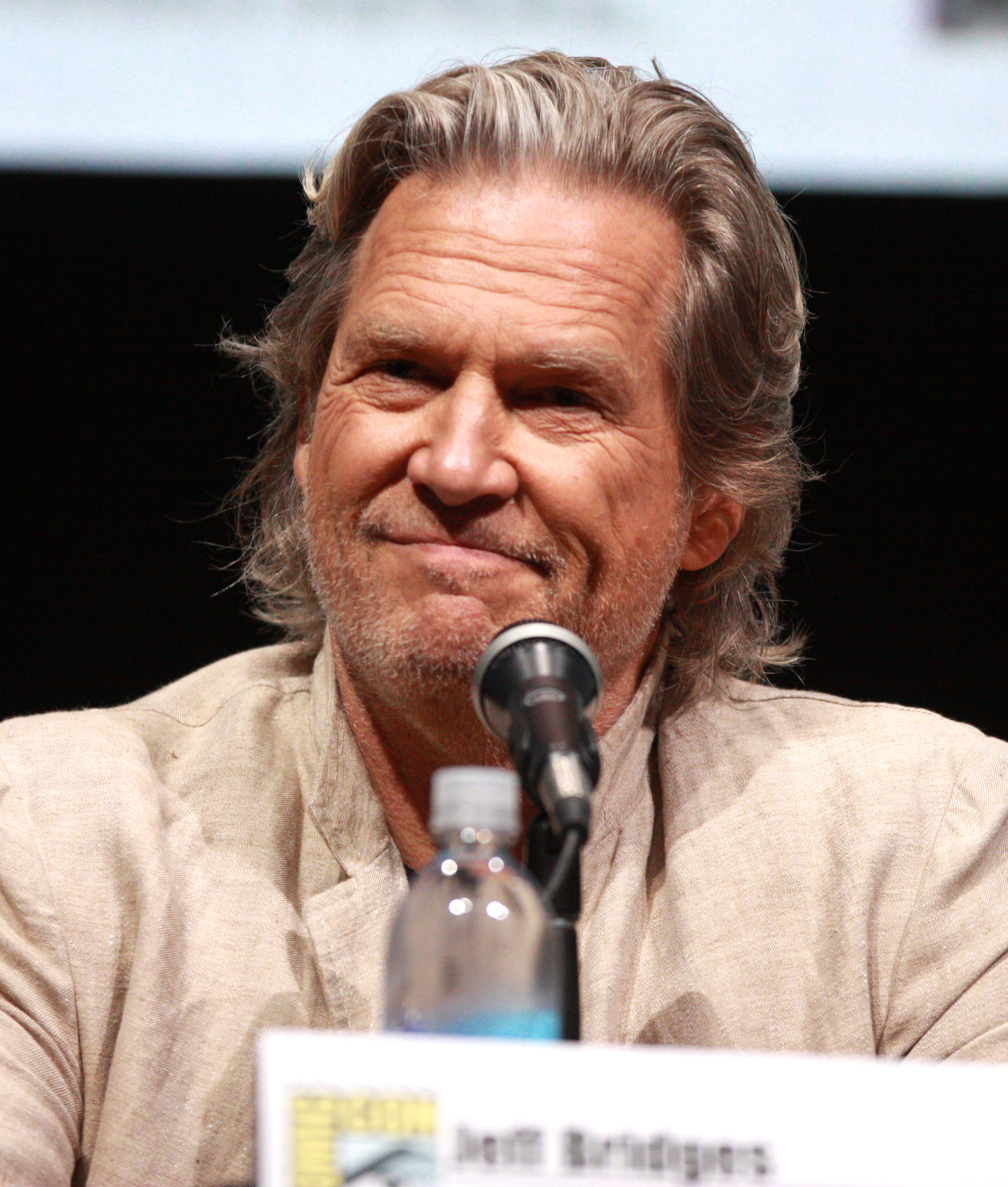
Jeff Bridges, Best Actor winner

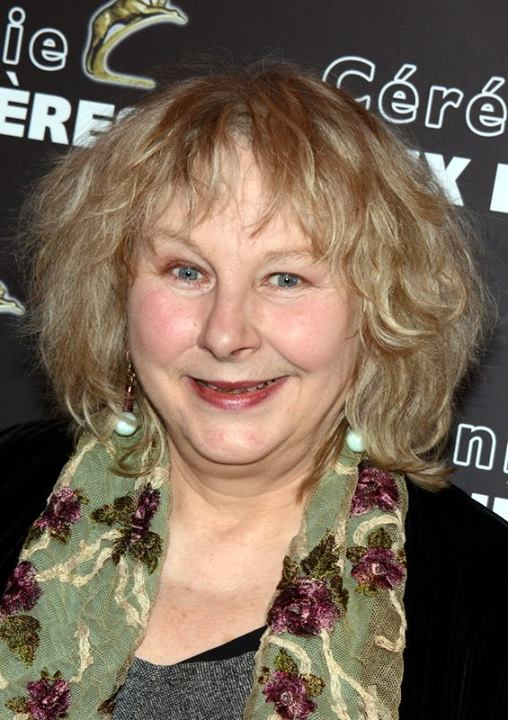
Yolande Moreau, Best Actress winner

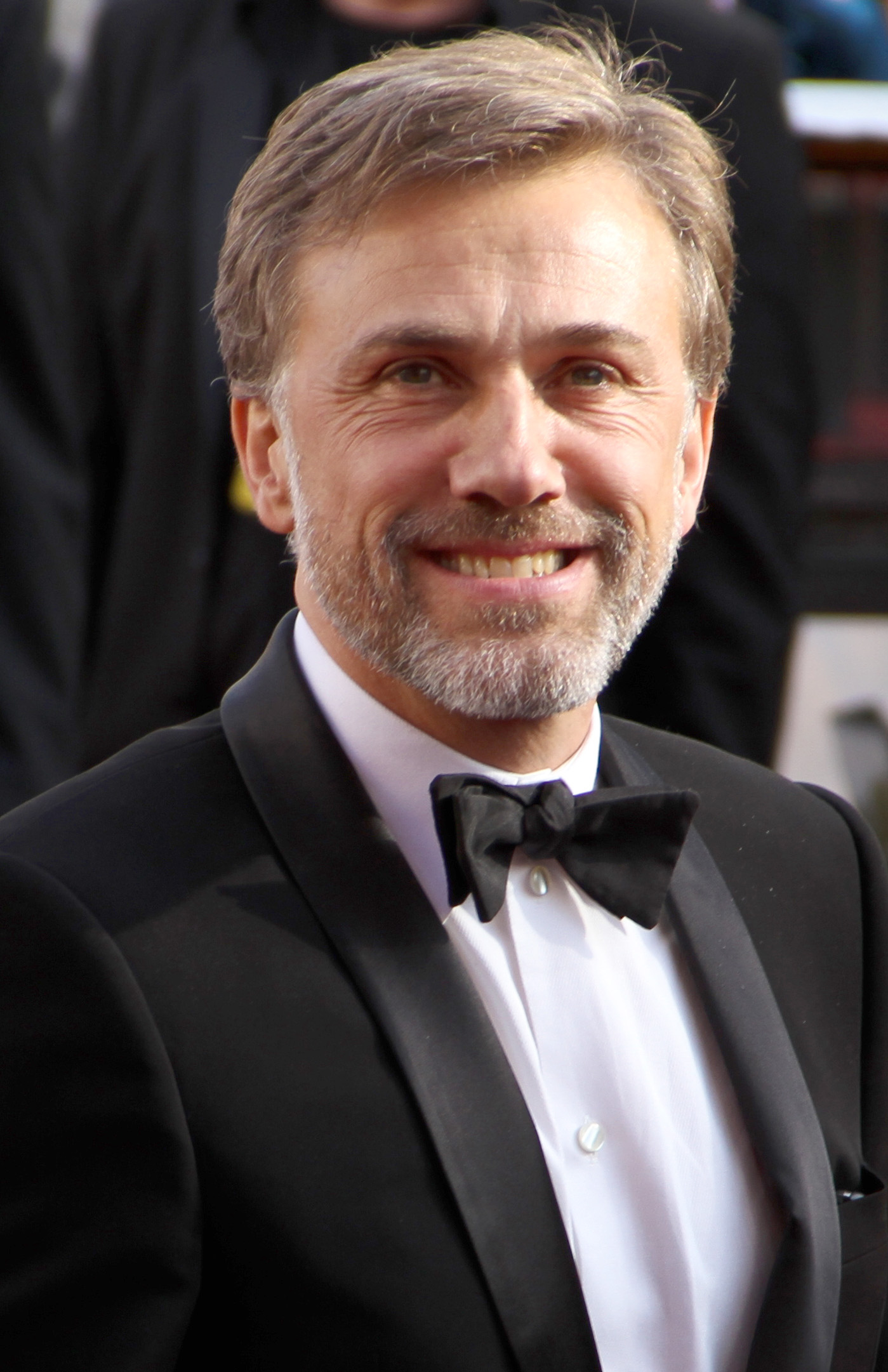
Christoph Waltz, Best Supporting Actor winner

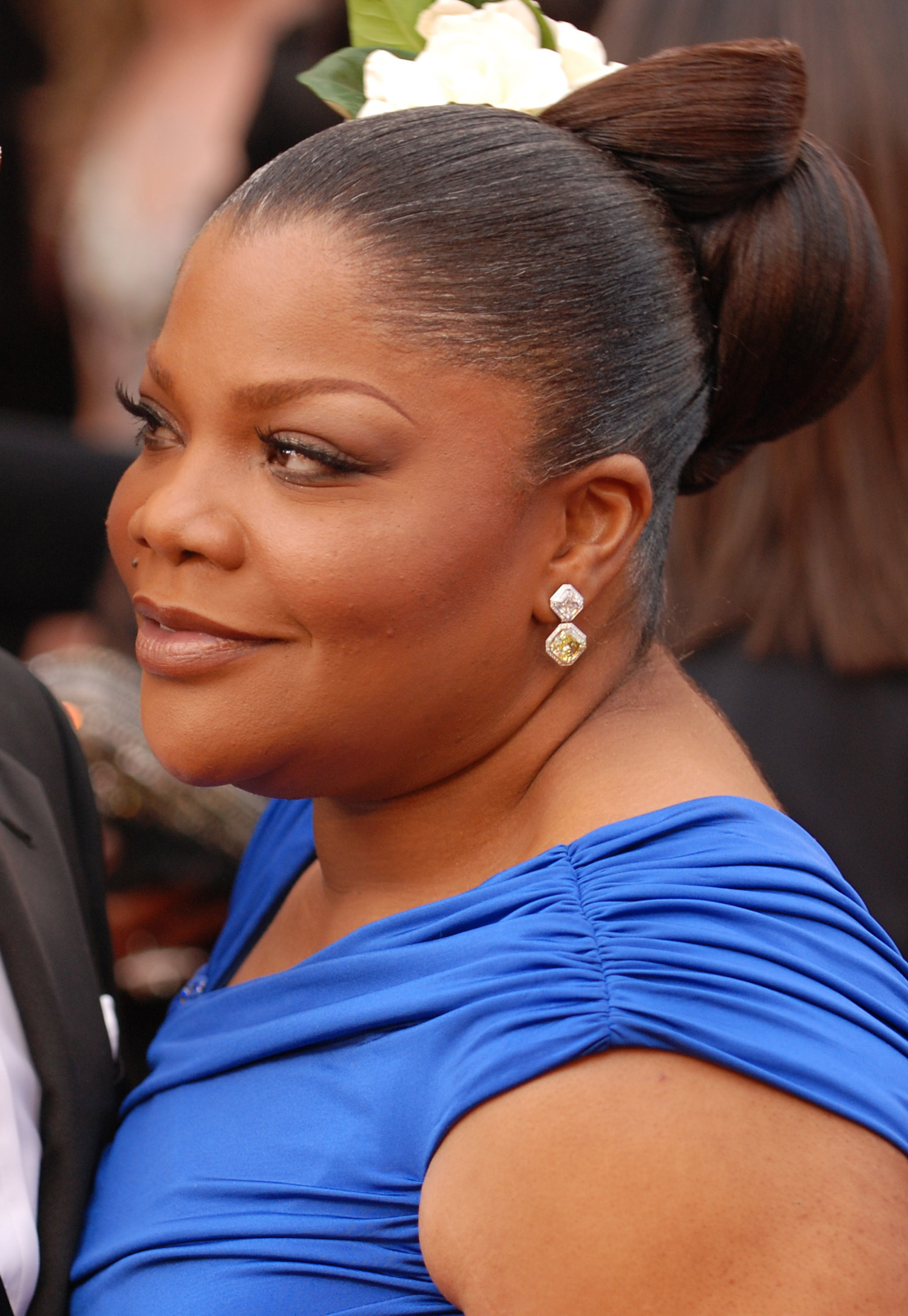
Mo'Nique, Best Supporting Actress winner

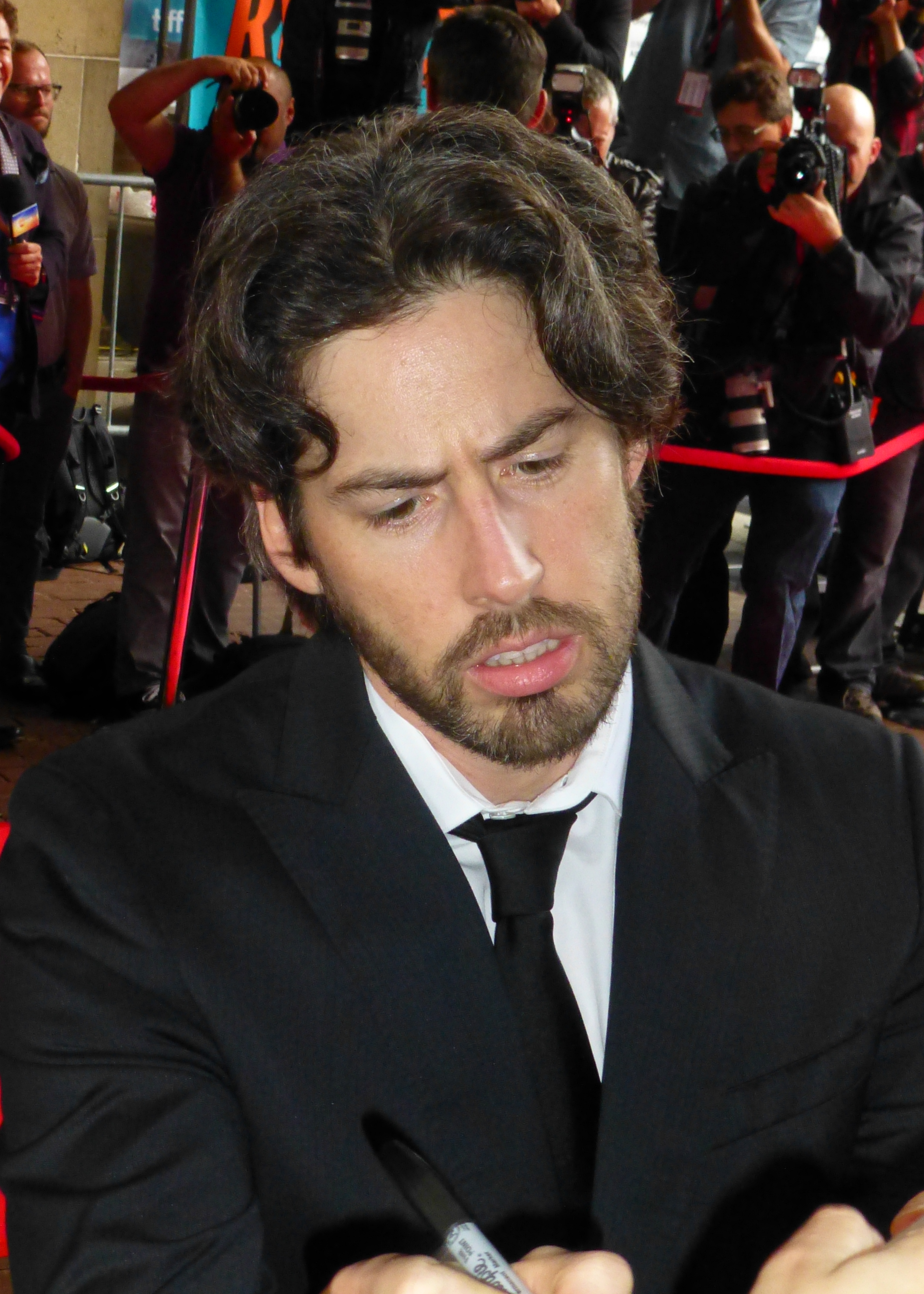
Jason Reitman, Best Screenplay co-winner

- Best Picture:
  - The Hurt Locker
  - Runner-up: Up in the Air
- Best Director:
  - Kathryn Bigelow – The Hurt Locker
  - Runner-up: Michael Haneke – The White Ribbon (Das weiße Band)
- Best Actor:
  - Jeff Bridges – Crazy Heart
  - Runner-up: Colin Firth – A Single Man
- Best Actress:
  - Yolande Moreau – Séraphine
  - Runner-up: Carey Mulligan – An Education
- Best Supporting Actor:
  - Christoph Waltz – Inglourious Basterds
  - Runner-up: Peter Capaldi – In the Loop
- Best Supporting Actress:
  - Mo'Nique – Precious
  - Runner-up: Anna Kendrick – Up in the Air
- Best Screenplay:
  - Jason Reitman and Sheldon Turner – Up in the Air
  - Runner-up: Jesse Armstrong, Simon Blackwell, Armando Iannucci, and Tony Roche – In the Loop
- Best Cinematography:
  - Christian Berger – The White Ribbon (Das weiße Band)
  - Runner-up: Barry Ackroyd – The Hurt Locker
- Best Production Design:
  - Philip Ivey – District 9
  - Runner-up: Rick Carter and Robert Stromberg – Avatar
- Best Music Score:
  - T Bone Burnett and Stephen Bruton – Crazy Heart
  - Runner-up: Alexandre Desplat – Fantastic Mr. Fox
- Best Foreign-Language Film:
  - Summer Hours (L'heure d'été) • France
  - Runner-up: The White Ribbon (Das weiße Band) • Germany
- Best Documentary/Non-Fiction Film (TIE):
  - The Beaches of Agnès (Les plages d'Agnès)
  - The Cove
- Best Animation:
  - Fantastic Mr. Fox
  - Runner-up: Up
- New Generation Award:
  - Neill Blomkamp – District 9
- Career Achievement Award:
  - Jean-Paul Belmondo
- The Douglas Edwards Experimental/Independent Film/Video Award:
  - Anders Edström and C. W. Winter – The Anchorage
- Special Citation:
  - In honor of the 50th anniversary of the French New Wave
