= Donald Chaffin =

British artist

- Born: 1944 (age 81–82); Nottingham, England
- Occupation: Artist

Donald W. Chaffin (born 1944) is a British artist. He is known for his illustrations for children's books, notably the first edition of Roald Dahl's Fantastic Mr Fox. He was also a consultant on Wes Anderson's stop-motion adaptation of the story, and received "special thanks" in the credits.

Chaffin was born in 1944 in Nottingham, and worked as the resident hatmaker at Nottingham Playhouse.

Chaffin's 1969 painting of Lord Byron is in the collection of Newstead Abbey. During development of the 2009 film adaptation of Fantastic Mr. Fox, director Wes Anderson reportedly enlisted Chaffin to help with the illustrations.
