= Fantastic Mr Fox (musical) =

2016 stage adaptation of Roald Dahl novel

- Production artwork
- Music: Arthur Darvill
- Lyrics: Darren Clark; Arthur Darvill; Sam Holcroft; Al Muriel
- Book: Sam Holcroft
- Basis: Fantastic Mr Fox by Roald Dahl
- Premiere: 30 November 2016: Nuffield Theatre, Southampton
- Productions: 2016 UK tour

Fantastic Mr Fox is a musical stage adaptation of the children's novel of the same name by Roald Dahl, adapted by Sam Holcroft with music by Arthur Darvill and lyrics by Holcroft, Darvill, Darren Clark and Al Muriel. The story follows Mr Fox who hatches a plan to outsmart his three farmer neighbours in order to feed his family and friends.

== Background ==
The production was directed by Maria Aberg and designed by Tom Scutt, and had its world premiere at the Nuffield Theatre, Southampton, over the Christmas season, from 30 November 2016 to 8 January 2017. It was co-produced by the Nuffield and Curve, Leicester, in association with the Lyric Hammersmith.

The musical toured in 2017 to Cardiff New Theatre (21 to 25 February), Dartford Orchard Theatre (28 February to 5 March), Milton Keynes Theatre (7 to 11 March), Oxford Playhouse (11 to 15 April), Belgrade Theatre Coventry (18 to 22 April), Lyceum Theatre Sheffield (2 to 6 May), King's Theatre Edinburgh (15 to 20 May), Theatre Royal Glasgow (22 to 27 May), Theatre Royal Bath (30 May to 3 June), Wycombe Swan (5 to 10 June), Theatre Royal Plymouth (13 to 17 June), Theatre Royal Norwich (21 to 24 June), Bradford Alhambra Theatre (27 June to 2 July), Lowry Theatre Salford (5 to 9 July).

== Cast and characters ==
Character	UK tour
Character	2016
Mr Fox	Greg Barnett
Rat/Bean	Richard Atwill
Badger/Boggis	Raphael Bushay
Kit	Jade Croot
Rabbit	Sandy Foster
Mrs Fox	Lillie Flynn
Mole/Bunce	Gruffudd Glyn
Mouse	Kelly Jackson
Ensemble	Edward Hole; Tanya Shields; Patrick Burbridge; Anna Fordham; Richie Hart
