= World Soundtrack Awards 2010 =

Belgian music awards ceremony

10th World Soundtrack Awards

October 23, 2010

Best Original Soundtrack:
Fantastic Mr. Fox

The 10th World Soundtrack Awards were given out on 23 October 2010 in Ghent, Belgium.

== Awards ==
=== World Soundtrack of the Year ===
Fantastic Mr. Fox by Alexandre Desplat

- Avatar by James Horner
- Where the Wild Things Are by Carter Burwell
- A Single Man by Abel Korzeniowski
- Sherlock Holmes by Hans Zimmer

=== Soundtrack Composer of the Year ===
Alexandre Desplat for Fantastic Mr. Fox, The Twilight Saga: New Moon, Julie & Julia, and The Ghost Writer

- Carter Burwell for Where the Wild Things Are, A Serious Man, The Kids Are All Right, The Blind Side, and Howl
- John Powell for Green Zone, How to Train Your Dragon, Knight and Day, and Ice Age: Dawn of the Dinosaurs
- Danny Elfman for The Wolfman and Alice in Wonderland
- Hans Zimmer for It's Complicated and Sherlock Holmes

=== Best Original Song ===
T-Bone Burnett (lyrics), Ryan Bingham (music/lyrics/performer) for "The Weary Kind" in Crazy Heart

- Anika Noni Rose (performer), Randy Newman (music/lyrics) for "Almost There" in The Princess and the Frog
- Jon Thor Birgisson for "Sticks and Stones" in How to Train Your Dragon
- Kuk Harrell (lyrics), Simon Franglen (music/lyrics), Leona Lewis (performer), James Horner (music/lyrics) for "I See You" in Avatar
- Paul McCartney for "(I Want to) Come Home" in Everybody's Fine

=== Discovery of the Year ===
A Single Man by Abel Korzeniowski

- The Book of Eli by Atticus Ross
- Skin by Hélène Muddiman
- District 9 by Clinton Shorter
- The Last Station by Sergei Yevtushenko

=== Public Choice Award ===
- A Single Man by Abel Korzeniowski

=== SABAM Award for Best Young European Composer ===
- Karzan Mahmood

=== Lifetime Achievement Award ===
- John Barry
