= Fantastic Mr Fox =

1970 children's novel by Roald Dahl

- Hardcover first edition cover
- Author: Roald Dahl
- Illustrator: Donald Chaffin (original); Jill Bennett (first 1974 U.K. Puffin paperback edition); Tony Ross; Quentin Blake
- Language: English
- Series: Roald Dahl Collection
- Genre: Children's and survival
- Publisher: George Allen & Unwin (original U.K.); Alfred A. Knopf, Inc. (original U.S.); Penguin Books (current)
- Publication date: 1 June 1970
- Publication place: United Kingdom
- Media type: Hardcover
- Pages: 96
- ISBN: 0-394-80497-X

Fantastic Mr Fox is a children's novel written by British author Roald Dahl. It was published in 1970, by George Allen & Unwin in the UK and Alfred A. Knopf in the U.S., with illustrations by Donald Chaffin. The first Puffin paperback, first issued in 1974, featured illustrations by Jill Bennett. Later editions have featured illustrations by Tony Ross (1988) and Quentin Blake (1996). The story is about Mr Fox and how he outwits his farmer neighbours to steal their food from right under their noses.

In 2009, it was adapted into a stop-motion animated film by Wes Anderson and included the voice of George Clooney as Mr Fox. The novel was also adapted into a musical in 2016, and an opera in 1998 which in 2019 was recorded by the Boston Modern Orchestra Project and Odyssey Opera.

In 2012, Mr Fox appeared on a Royal Mail commemorative postage stamp. Two audio readings of the novel were released, one with the author narrating, and another with actor Martin Jarvis narrating.

== Plot ==
Mr Fox is an anthropomorphic, tricky, and clever fox who lives underground beside a tree with his wife and four children. To feed his family, he makes nightly visits to local farms owned by three cruel, rude, wicked and dim-witted farmers named Boggis, Bunce, and Bean, stealing poultry from each. Tired of being outsmarted by Mr Fox, the triumvirate devise a plan to ambush him as he leaves his burrow, but they succeed only in shooting off his tail.

The three farmers then dig up the Foxes' burrow using spades and then excavators. The Foxes manage to escape by burrowing further beneath the ground to safety. The farmers are ridiculed for their persistence, but they refuse to give up and vow not to return to their farms until they have caught Mr Fox. They then choose to lay siege to the Foxes, surrounding the hole and waiting until Mr Fox becomes hungry enough to come out. Cornered by their enemies, Mr Fox and his family, and all the other underground creatures that live around the hill, begin to starve.

After three days trapped underground, Mr Fox devises a plot to acquire food. Working from his memory of the aboveground routes he has used, he and his children tunnel into Boggis's four chicken houses. Mr Fox kills several chickens and sends his son to carry the animals back home to Mrs Fox. On the way to their next destination, Mr Fox runs into his friend Badger and asks him to accompany him on his mission, as well as to extend an invitation to the feast to the other burrowing animals - Badger and his family, as well as the Moles, the Rabbits and the Weasels - to apologize for getting them caught up in the farmers' hunt. Aided by Badger, the animals tunnel to Bunce's storehouse for additional food, with his two daughters bringing the food back to the feast, and then, Mr Fox, Badger, and Mr Fox's second son tunnel to Bean's secret cider cellar. Here, they are nearly caught by Bean's servant Mabel and have an unpleasant confrontation with the cellar's resident, Rat. They carry their loot back home, where Mrs Fox has prepared a great celebratory banquet for the starving underground animals and their families.

At the table, Mr Fox invites everyone to live in a secret underground neighbourhood with him and his family, where he will hunt on their behalf and none of them will need to worry about the farmers anymore. Everyone joyfully cheers for this idea, while Boggis, Bunce, and Bean are left waiting in vain for Mr Fox to emerge from his hole.

The book ends with the narrator reciting the words "And so far as I know, they are still waiting".

== Awards ==
In 1994, Fantastic Mr Fox was awarded the Read Aloud BILBY Award from the Children's Book Council of Australia.

== 2023 revisions ==
Despite Roald Dahl having enjoined his publishers not to "so much as change a single comma in one of my books", in February 2023 Puffin Books, a division of Penguin Books, announced that it would be re-writing portions of many of Dahl's children's novels, changing the language to, in the publisher's words, "ensure that it can continue to be enjoyed by all today". The decision was met with sharp criticism from groups and public figures including authors Salman Rushdie and Christopher Paolini, former British prime minister Rishi Sunak, Queen Camilla, Kemi Badenoch, PEN America, and Brian Cox. Dahl's publishers in the United States, France, and the Netherlands declined to incorporate the changes.

In Fantastic Mr. Fox, more than fifty changes were made, including removing the word black from the description of tractors ("The machines were both black"), removing references to characters' height and weight and changing Mr. Fox’s son to a daughter. A line saying that "fat Boggis was hopping about like a dervish" was also altered to just "Boggis was hopping about like a frog".

== Adaptations ==
=== Film adaptation ===
The book was adapted into a stop-motion animated film by director Wes Anderson. It was released in 2009 and features the voices of George Clooney as Mr Fox, Meryl Streep as Mrs Fox, Bill Murray as Badger, Robert Hurlstone as Boggis, Hugo Guinness as Bunce and Michael Gambon as Bean. The film's plot focuses more on Mr Fox's relationship with Mrs Fox and his son, which is pitted against Mr Fox's desire to steal chickens as a means of feeling like his natural self. The film adds scenes before Mr Fox attacks the three farmers and after they bulldozed the hill, as well as a slightly altered ending and more background on Mr Fox's past life as a thief of food. The Foxes' four children are replaced by Ash (voiced by Jason Schwartzman), a small and insecure fox who seeks his father's approval and Mrs. Fox's nephew Kristofferson (voiced by Eric Chase Anderson), who excels in athletics and is a source of jealousy for Ash.

=== Stage adaptations ===
The book was adapted into a play of the same name by David Wood and was first performed at the Belgrade Theatre, Coventry in 2001. The play is licensed (in the U.K. only) through Casarotto Ramsay Ltd. for repertory performances and Samuel French Ltd. for amateur performances.

A musical adaptation of the book ran at the Nuffield Theatre, Southampton during Christmas 2016 before touring the UK in early 2017.

=== Opera ===
Tobias Picker adapted the book into an opera which had its world premiere at the Los Angeles Opera performing 9–22 December in 1998. The opera starred Gerald Finley as Mr Fox and Suzanna Guzman as Mrs Fox. A specially commissioned new version of this opera by Opera Holland Park was performed in the gardens and natural scenery of Holland Park in the summer of 2010 staged by Stephen Barlow. This version starred Grant Doyle as Mr. Fox, Olivia Ray as Mrs. Fox, Henry Grant Kerswell, Peter Kent and John Lofthouse as Farmers Boggis, Bunce and Bean.

In 2019, Fantastic Mr. Fox was recorded by the Boston Modern Orchestra Project and Odyssey Opera who were subsequently awarded the Grammy Award for Best Opera Recording.
