= The Beach Boys =

American rock band

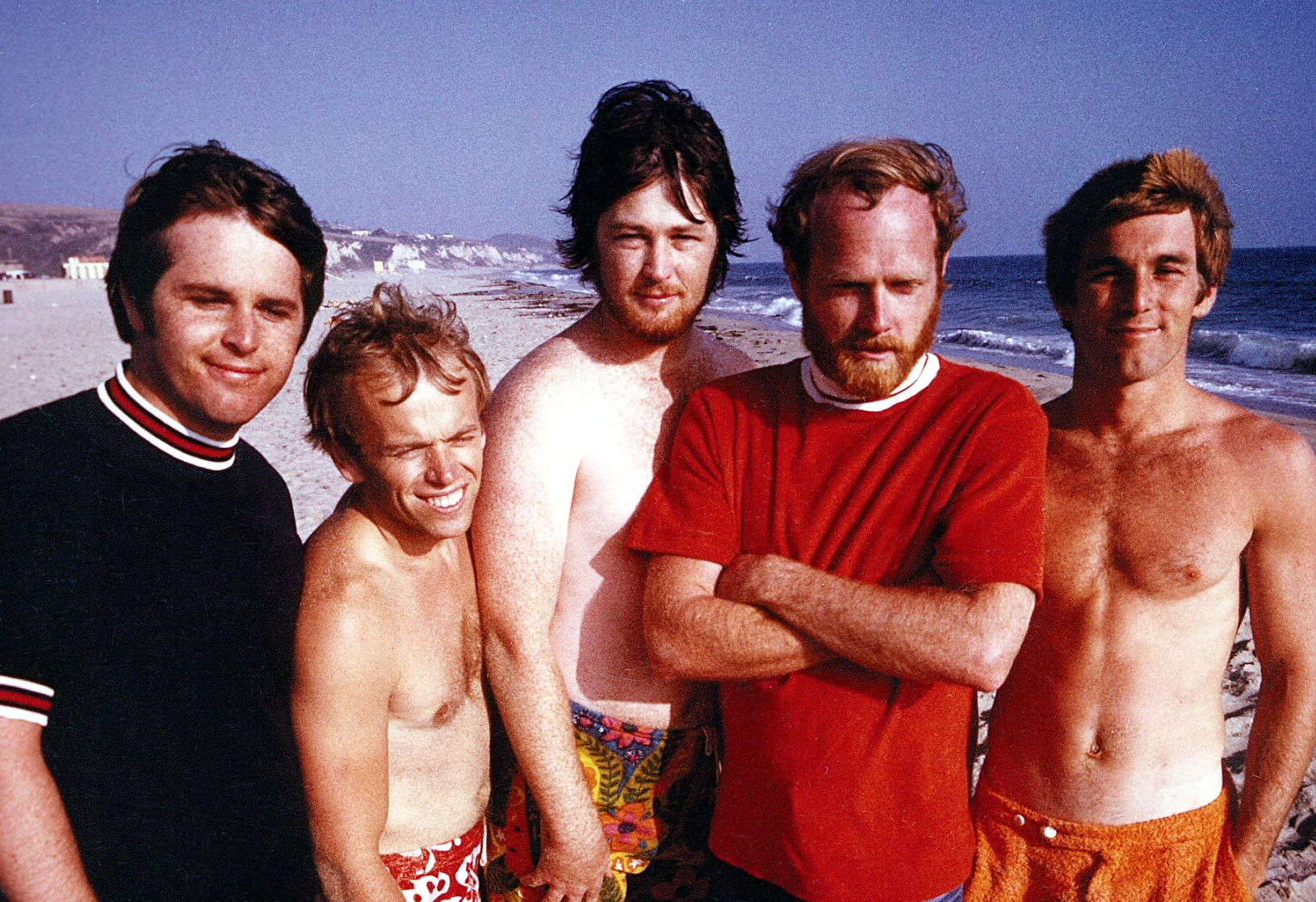
- The Beach Boys' original lineup in 1967, from left to right: Carl Wilson, Al Jardine, Brian Wilson, Mike Love, and Dennis Wilson

Background information
- Origin: Hawthorne, California, U.S.
- Genres: Rock; pop; surf; psychedelia
- Works: Discography; songs (unreleased); covers; unreleased projects; live performances
- Years active: 1961–present
- Labels: Candix; Capitol; Brother; Warner Bros.; Reprise; CBS; Caribou
- Spinoffs: Kenny & the Cadets; California Music; Celebration; Pet Sounds Band
- Members: Mike Love
- Past members: Brian Wilson; Carl Wilson; Dennis Wilson; Al Jardine; David Marks; Bruce Johnston; Ricky Fataar; Blondie Chaplin
- Website: thebeachboys.com

The Beach Boys are an American rock band formed in Hawthorne, California, in 1961. The group's founding members were brothers Brian, Dennis, and Carl Wilson, their cousin Mike Love, and their friend Al Jardine. One of the most popular and influential acts of the rock era, they are known for their musical ingenuity, vocal harmonies, and lyrics initially reflecting southern California's youth culture of surfing, cars, and romance dubbed the "California sound". The group drew on the music of 1950s rock and roll, R&B, and pre-rock and roll pop vocal groups to create their sound. Under Brian's leadership, they often incorporated classical or jazz elements and unconventional recording techniques in innovative ways.

Initially part of the early 1960s surf music craze, the band was originally managed by the Wilsons' father, Murry, and centered on Brian's songwriting, arranging, and producing. The Wilsons' neighbor David Marks replaced Jardine during 1962–1963. Signing with Capitol Records, their early hits included "Surfin' U.S.A." (1963), "Fun Fun Fun", "Don't Worry Baby", "I Get Around" (all 1964), "Help Me Rhonda", and "California Girls" (both 1965). One of the few pre-Beatles American rock bands to sustain their commercial standing during the British Invasion, by 1965 they had transitioned to an increasingly orchestral, album-oriented, and studio-focused direction distanced from surf music. That year, Bruce Johnston joined the group when Brian ceased touring to devote more time to his songwriting and production. Released in 1966, the Pet Sounds album and "Good Vibrations" single are widely regarded as among the greatest and most influential works in popular music history.

After shelving the Smile album and launching their Brother Records imprint in 1967, the band's commercial and critical momentum in the U.S. faltered. Their late 1960s albums Wild Honey (1967), Friends (1968), and 20/20 (1969) saw Brian gradually cede control of the group to his bandmates. Moving to Reprise Records in 1970, Carl took over as de facto leader and produced the bulk of their early 1970s records, including Sunflower (1970), Surf's Up (1971), and Holland (1973), with Blondie Chaplin and Ricky Fataar of the Flames briefly joining the group during this period. Brian reassumed sole producer duties on the albums 15 Big Ones (1976) and The Beach Boys Love You (1977). Dennis drowned in 1983, and following Carl's death from lung cancer in 1998, Love was granted exclusive legal rights to tour under the Beach Boys name. Brian, Love, Jardine, Marks, and Johnston temporarily reunited for the album That's Why God Made the Radio (2012) and accompanying world tour. Brian died in 2025 of respiratory arrest. Johnston continued with Love's Beach Boys until 2026, leaving Love as the sole official member, while Jardine currently tours with Brian's former touring and recording group, the Pet Sounds Band.

The Beach Boys are one of the most critically acclaimed and commercially successful bands of all time, selling over 100 million records worldwide. They helped legitimize popular music as a recognized art form and influenced the development of music genres and movements such as psychedelia, power pop, progressive rock, punk, alternative, and lo-fi music. As of 2026, they have had 37 songs reach the top 40 of the U.S. Billboard Hot 100, the most by an American band, with four topping the chart. In 2004, the group was ranked number 12 on Rolling Stone's list of the greatest artists of all time, the highest ranking of any American band. The founding members were inducted into the Rock and Roll Hall of Fame in 1988.

== History ==
=== 1958–1962: Formation and first recordings ===
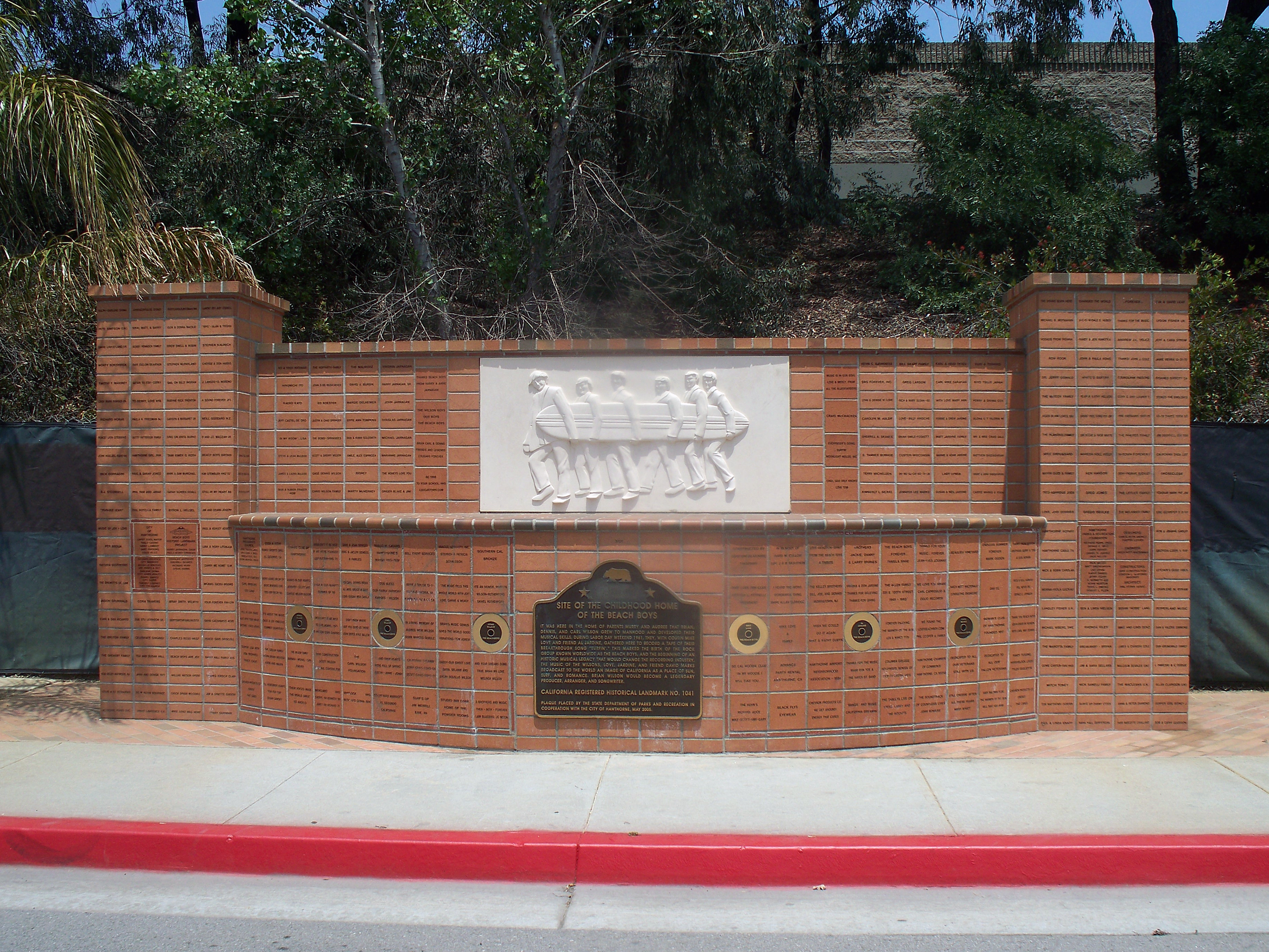
Historical landmark in Hawthorne, California, marking where the Wilson family home once stood

At the time of his 16th birthday on June 20, 1958, Brian Wilson shared a bedroom with his brothers, Dennis and Carl—aged 13 and 11, respectively—in their family home in Hawthorne. He had watched his father, Murry Wilson, play piano, and had listened intently to the harmonies of vocal groups such as the Four Freshmen. After dissecting songs such as "Ivory Tower" and "Good News", Brian would teach family members how to sing the background harmonies. For his birthday that year, Brian received a reel-to-reel tape recorder. He learned how to overdub, using his vocals and those of Carl and their mother. Brian played piano, while Carl and David Marks, an eleven-year-old longtime neighbor, played guitars that each had received as Christmas presents.

Soon Brian and Carl were avidly listening to Johnny Otis' KFOX radio show. Inspired by the simple structure and vocals of the rhythm and blues songs he heard, Brian changed his piano-playing style and started writing songs. Family gatherings brought the Wilsons in contact with cousin Mike Love. Brian taught Love's sister Maureen and a friend harmonies. Later, Brian, Carl, Love and two friends performed at Hawthorne High School under the name "Carl and The Passions". Brian also knew Al Jardine, a high school classmate. Brian suggested to Jardine that they team up with his cousin and brother Carl. Soon after Dennis also joined the band on demand of the Wilson's mother, Audree. Dennis was the only avid surfer in the group, and he suggested that the group write songs that celebrated the sport and the lifestyle that it had inspired in Southern California. (Note: Nick Venet said that none of the members, including Dennis, surfed until after the fact.) Brian finished the song, titled "Surfin'", and with Mike Love, wrote "Surfin' Safari". Love gave the fledgling band its name: "The Pendletones", a pun on "Pendleton", a brand of woolen shirt popular among local surfers at the time.

Murry Wilson, who was an occasional songwriter, arranged for the Pendletones to meet his publisher, Hite Morgan. He said: "Finally, [Hite] agreed to hear it, and Mrs. Morgan said 'Drop everything, we're going to record your song. I think it's good.' And she's the one responsible." The band recorded a demo of "Surfin'" with the Morgans. A more professional recording was made sometime later at World Pacific Studio in Hollywood. In 2015, author James B. Murphy disputed the commonly cited dates of September 15, 1961, for the demo session and October 3 for the studio session, as "no documentation or other verifiable proof" was known to exist from first-hand sources. Murphy placed the group's demo session with the Morgans as taking place in early October 1961, and the World Pacific session in early November. David Marks was not present at the session as he was in school that day. (Note: Since he did not appear on the first performance by the band that would become "the Beach Boys", most historians discount him as a true founding member of the group.)

Morgan was friends with KFWB record librarian Bill Angel, who liked the song. Through Angel's contacts with Joe Saraceno, A&R director of Candix Records, Morgan played "Surfin'" for Saraceno, who then played it for the company's co-founder Bob Dix, who gave his approval. On November 27, Candix released "Surfin'". When the single was released, the band found that they had been renamed "the Beach Boys". Hite Morgan had wanted to name the group the Surfers, until Russ Regan, employed with the label's distributor Buckeye Record Distributors, noted that there already existed a group by that name. He suggested calling them the Beach Boys. "Surfin'" was a regional success in the West Coast, and reached number 75 on the national Billboard Hot 100 chart.

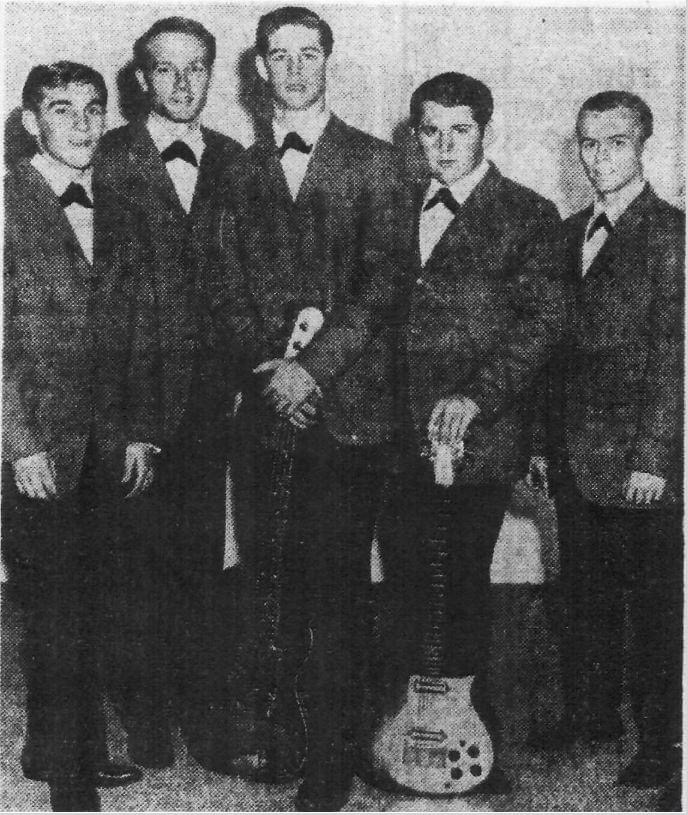
The Beach Boys on New Year's Eve 1961; from left: Dennis Wilson, Mike Love, Brian and Carl Wilson, Al Jardine

By this time the de facto manager of the Beach Boys, Murry landed the group's first paying gig (for which they earned $300) on New Year's Eve, 1961, at the Ritchie Valens Memorial Dance in Long Beach. In their early public appearances, the band wore the heavy Pendleton woolen jacket-like shirts that local surfers favored before switching to their trademark striped shirts and white pants (a look that was taken directly from the Kingston Trio). All five members sang, with Brian on bass, Dennis on drums, Carl on lead guitar, and Al Jardine on rhythm guitar, while Mike Love was the main singer and occasionally played saxophone.

In early 1962, Morgan requested that some of the members add vocals to a couple of instrumental tracks that he had recorded with other musicians. This led to the creation of the short-lived group Kenny & the Cadets, which Brian led under the pseudonym "Kenny". The other members were Carl, Jardine, and the Wilsons' mother, Audree. (Note: The only songs the group recorded were two Morgan compositions "Barbie" and "What Is a Young Girl Made Of?") In February, Jardine left the Beach Boys and was replaced by David Marks.

=== 1962–1969: Capitol era ===
==== Early surf- and hot rod-themed period ====
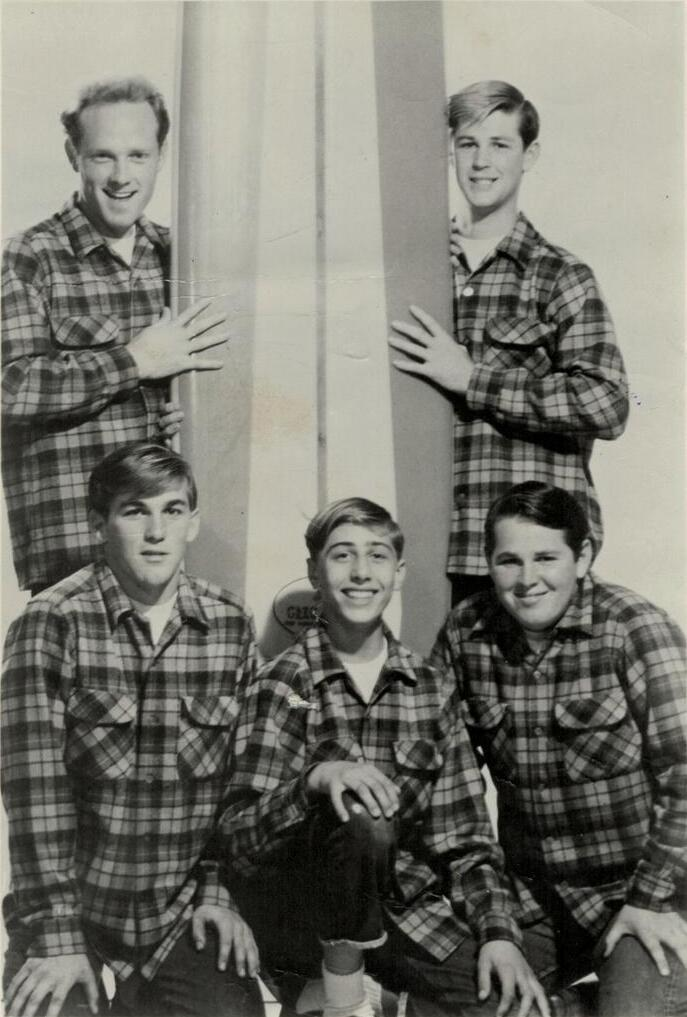
The band at a late 1962 photoshoot; clockwise from top left: Love, Brian, Carl, David Marks, Dennis

After being turned down by Dot and Liberty, the Beach Boys signed a seven-year contract with Capitol Records under executive and staff producer Nick Venet. On June 4, 1962, the Beach Boys debuted on Capitol with their second single, "Surfin' Safari" backed with "409". "Surfin' Safari" rose to number 14 and found airplay in New York and Phoenix, a surprise for the label. Their debut album, Surfin' Safari, followed in October 1962 and was different from other rock albums of the time in that it consisted almost entirely of original songs, primarily written by Brian with Mike Love and friend Gary Usher. Another unusual feature of the Beach Boys was that, although they were marketed as "surf music", their repertoire bore little resemblance to the music of other surf bands, which was mainly instrumental and incorporated heavy use of spring reverb. For this reason, some of the Beach Boys' early local performances had young audience members throwing vegetables at the band, believing that the group were poseurs.

"Surfin' U.S.A." (1963)
"Surfin' U.S.A." was a rewrite of Chuck Berry's "Sweet Little Sixteen" with lyrics about surfing, later becoming one of the best known surf rock songs.

In January 1963, the Beach Boys recorded their first top-ten single, "Surfin' U.S.A.", which began their long run of highly successful recording efforts. It was during the sessions for this single that Brian made the production decision from that point on to use double tracking on the group's vocals, resulting in a deeper and more resonant sound. The album of the same name followed in March and reached number 2 on the Billboard charts. Its success propelled the group into a nationwide spotlight, and was vital to launching surf music as a national craze, albeit the Beach Boys' vocal approach to the genre, not the original instrumental style pioneered by Dick Dale. Jardine returned on a part-time basis in spring 1963 so Brian could make fewer live appearances and spend more time on songwriting.

Released in September, Surfer Girl marked the first time the group used outside musicians on a substantial portion of an LP. Many of them were the musicians Spector used for his Wall of Sound productions. The next month, the group's fourth album Little Deuce Coupe was issued. Additionally, disputes between Marks, his parents, and Murry led Marks to quit that month, with Jardine rejoining full-time. In December, they released a standalone Christmas-themed single "Little Saint Nick", backed with an a cappella rendition of the scriptural song "The Lord's Prayer". The A-side peaked at number 3 on the US Billboard Christmas chart.

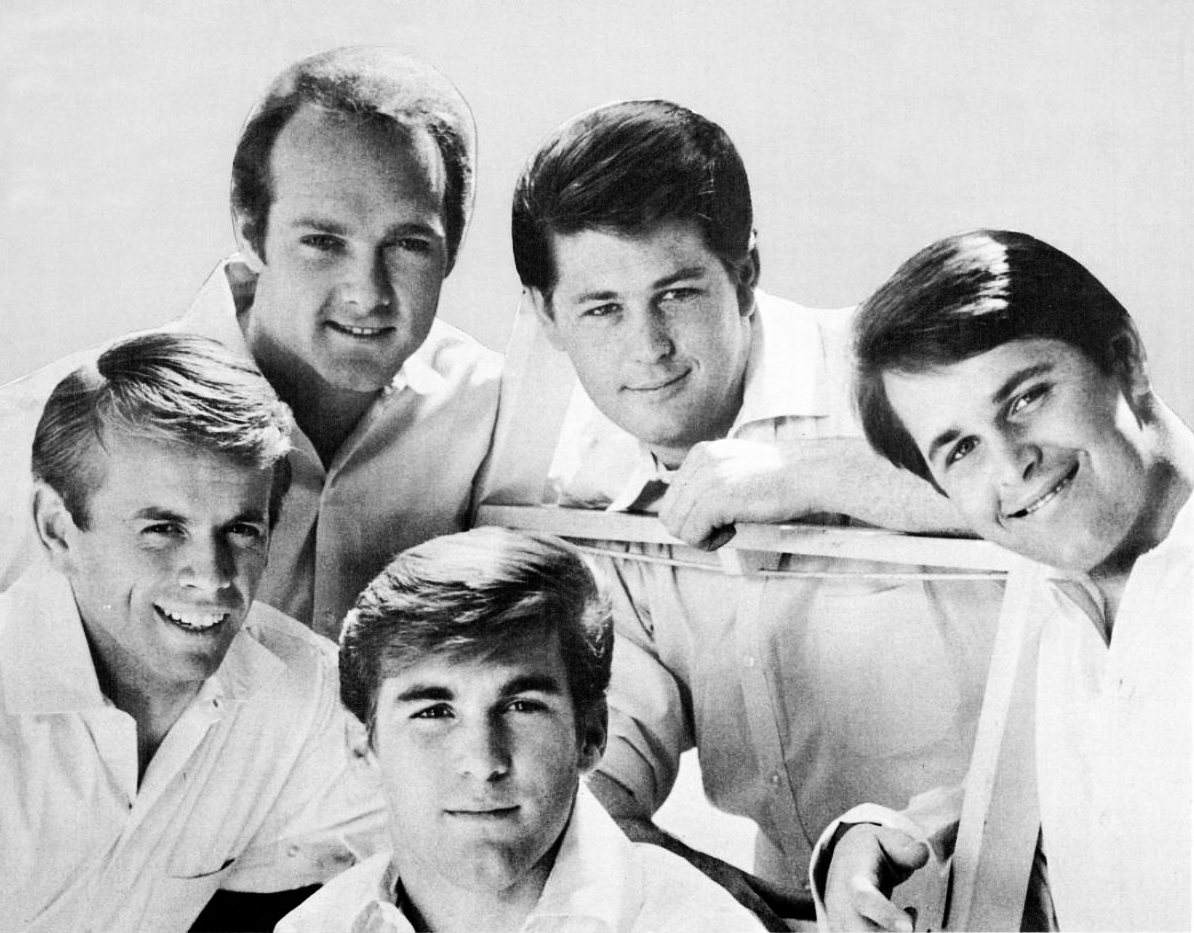
The Beach Boys in 1964; clockwise from top left: Love, Brian, Carl, Dennis, Jardine

The surf music craze, along with the careers of nearly all surf acts, was slowly replaced by the British Invasion. Following a successful Australasian tour in January and February 1964, the Beach Boys returned home to face their new competition, the Beatles. Both groups shared the same record label in the US, and Capitol's support for the Beach Boys immediately began waning. Although it generated a top-five single in "Fun Fun Fun", the group's fifth album, Shut Down Volume 2, became their first since Surfin' Safari not to reach the US top-ten. This caused Murry to fight for the band at the label more than before, often visiting their offices without warning to "twist executive arms", in biographer Peter Ames Carlin's description.

We needed to grow. Up to this point we had milked every idea dry [and did] every possible angle about surfing and [cars]. But we needed to grow artistically.

— Brian Wilson

Brian wrote his last surf song for nearly four years, "Don't Back Down", in April 1964. That month, during recording of the single "I Get Around", the band dismissed Murry as their manager. He remained in close contact with the group, offering unsolicited advice on their business decisions. When "I Get Around" was released in May, it would climb to number 1 in the US and Canada, their first single to do so (also reaching the top-ten in Sweden and the UK), proving that the Beach Boys could compete with contemporary British pop groups. "I Get Around" and "Don't Back Down" both appeared on the band's sixth album All Summer Long, released in July 1964 and reaching number 4 in the US. All Summer Long introduced exotic textures to the Beach Boys' sound exemplified by the piccolos and xylophones of its title track. The album was a swan-song to the surf and car music the Beach Boys built their commercial standing upon. Later albums took a different stylistic and lyrical path. Before this, a live album, Beach Boys Concert, was released in October to a four-week chart stay at number 1, containing a set list of previously recorded songs and covers that they had not yet recorded.

==== Brian's withdrawal from touring and The Beach Boys Today! ====
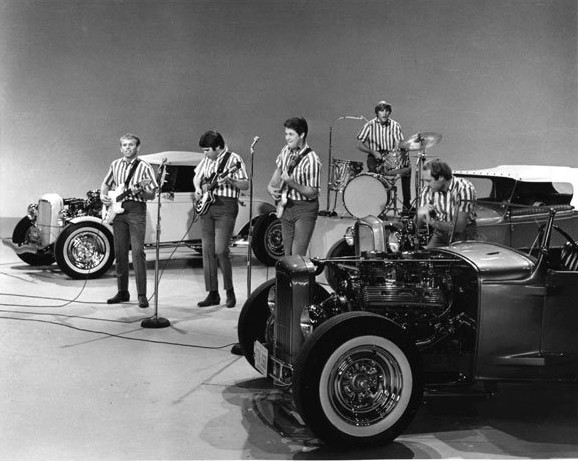
The band performing "I Get Around" on The Ed Sullivan Show in September 1964

In June 1964, Brian recorded the bulk of The Beach Boys' Christmas Album with a forty-one-piece studio orchestra in collaboration with Four Freshmen arranger Dick Reynolds. The album was a response to Phil Spector's A Christmas Gift for You (1963). Released in December, the Beach Boys' album was divided between five new, original Christmas-themed songs, and seven reinterpretations of traditional Christmas songs, later ranked among the finest holiday albums of the rock era. One single from the album, "The Man with All the Toys", was released, peaking at number 6 on the US Billboard Christmas chart. On October 29, the Beach Boys performed for The T.A.M.I. Show, a concert film intended to bring together a wide range of musicians for a one-off performance. The result was released to movie theaters one month later.

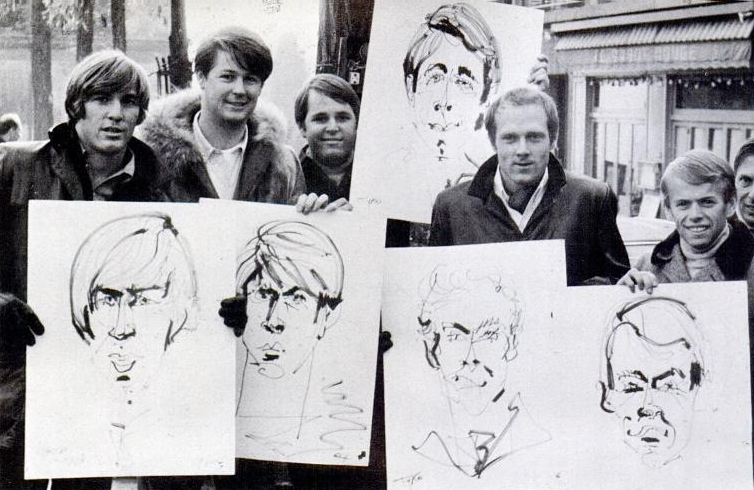
The band with caricatures in Paris, November 1964

In December, while on a flight from Los Angeles to Houston, Brian suffered a panic attack brought on by the stress of continuous road travel, writing, and producing. In January 1965, he announced his withdrawal from touring to concentrate entirely on songwriting and record production. For the last few days of 1964 and into early 1965, session musician and up-and-coming solo artist Glen Campbell agreed to temporarily serve as Brian's replacement in concert. Carl took over as the band's musical director onstage. (Note: Contracts at that time stipulated that promoters hire "Carl Wilson plus four other musicians". Additionally, in February, July, and October, Brian rejoined the live group for one-off occasions.)

Released in March 1965, The Beach Boys Today! marked the first time the group experimented with the "album-as-art" form. Music writer Scott Schinder referenced its "suite-like structure" as an early example of the rock album format being used to make a cohesive artistic statement. Brian also established his new lyrical approach toward the autobiographical; journalist Nick Kent wrote that the subjects of Brian's songs "were suddenly no longer simple happy souls harmonizing their sun-kissed innocence and dying devotion to each other over a honey-coated backdrop of surf and sand". In the book Yeah Yeah Yeah: The Story of Modern Pop, Bob Stanley remarked that "Brian was aiming for Johnny Mercer but coming up proto-indie."

In April 1965, Campbell's own career success pulled him from touring with the group. Columbia Records staff producer Bruce Johnston was asked to locate a replacement for Campbell; having failed to find one, Johnston himself became a full-time member of the band. The June 4 vocal sessions for "California Girls" marked Johnston's first recording session with the Beach Boys. "California Girls" was included on the band's next album Summer Days (And Summer Nights!!). The first single from Summer Days had been a reworked arrangement of "Help Me, Rhonda", which became the band's second number 1 US single in the spring of 1965.

To appease Capitol's demands for a Beach Boys LP for the 1965 Christmas season, Brian conceived Beach Boys' Party!, a live-in-the-studio album consisting mostly of acoustic covers of 1950s rock and R&B songs, in addition to covers of three Beatles songs, Bob Dylan's "The Times They Are a-Changin'", and idiosyncratic rerecordings of the group's earlier songs. The album was an early precursor of the "unplugged" trend. It also included a cover of the Regents' song "Barbara Ann", which unexpectedly reached number 2 when released as a single several weeks later. In November, the group released another top-twenty single, "The Little Girl I Once Knew".

==== Pet Sounds, Smile, and "Good Vibrations" ====
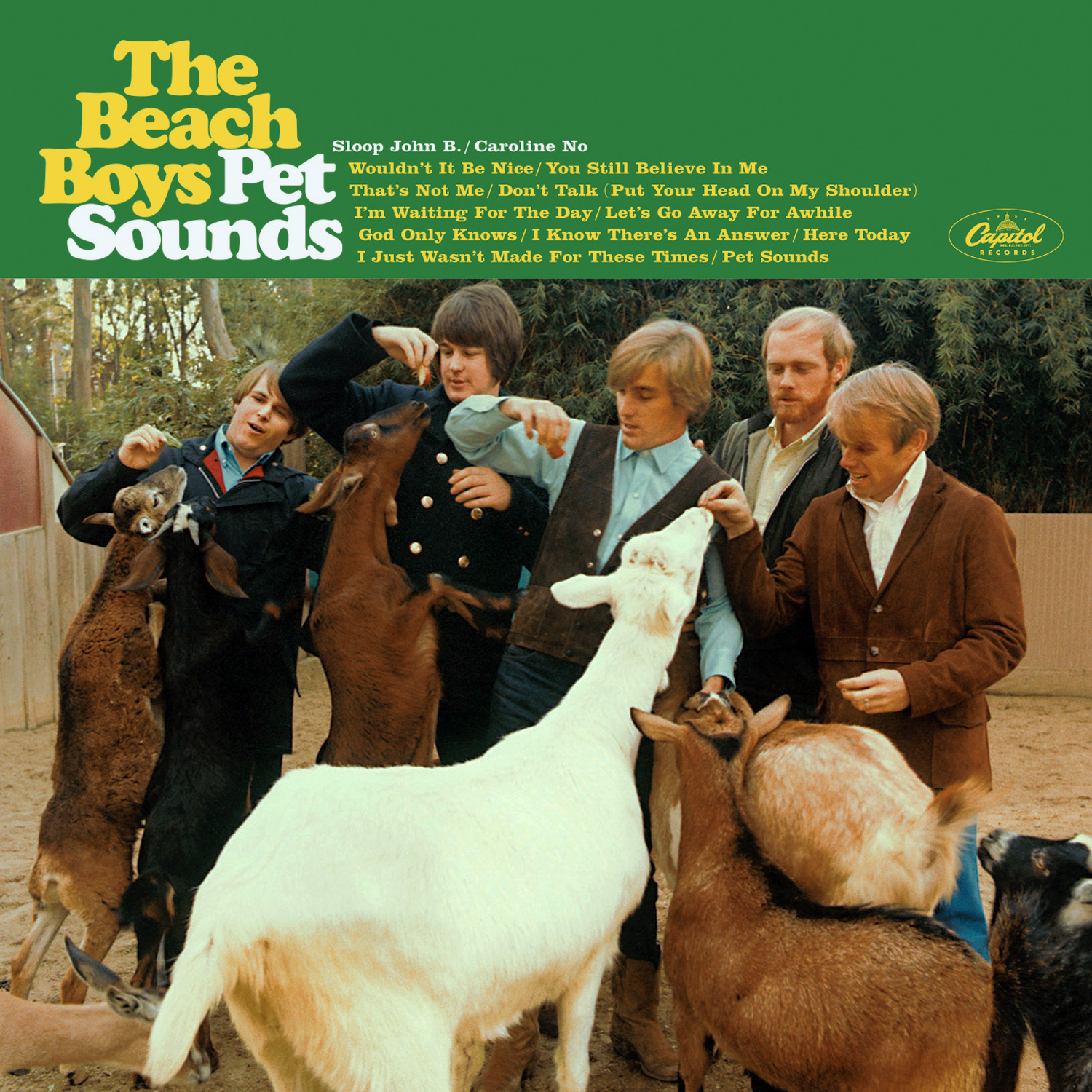
Front cover of Pet Sounds (1966), the Beach Boys' most critically acclaimed album

Wilson collaborated with jingle writer Tony Asher on several of the songs for the album Pet Sounds, a refinement of the themes and ideas introduced in Today!. In some ways, the music was a jarring departure from their earlier style. Released on May 16, 1966, Pet Sounds was widely influential and raised the band's prestige as an innovative rock group. Early reviews for the album in the US ranged from negative to tentatively positive, and its sales numbered approximately 500,000 units, a drop-off from the run of albums that immediately preceded it. Within two months, the label capitulated by releasing the group's first greatest hits compilation album, Best of the Beach Boys, which was quickly certified gold by the RIAA.

"God Only Knows" (1966)
"God Only Knows" conditions its tonality between the keys of E and A major, which according to musicologist Stephen Downes, was innovative even in the context of the song's Baroque antecedents. It is often praised as one of the greatest songs ever written.

In Britain throughout 1966, EMI flooded the UK market with Beach Boys albums not yet released there, including Beach Boys' Party!, The Beach Boys Today! and Summer Days (and Summer Nights!!), while Best of the Beach Boys was number 2 there for several weeks at the end of the year. Thanks to mutual connections, Brian had been introduced to the Beatles' former press officer Derek Taylor, who was subsequently employed as the Beach Boys' publicist. Responding to Brian's request to reinvent the band's image, Taylor devised a promotion campaign with the tagline "Brian Wilson is a genius", a belief Taylor sincerely held. Pet Sounds met a highly favorable critical response in Britain, where it reached number 2 and remained among the top-ten positions for six months. Taylor's prestige was crucial in offering a credible perspective to those on the outside, and his efforts are widely recognized as instrumental in the album's success in Britain.

"Good Vibrations" (1966)
"Good Vibrations" was the Beach Boys' third single to top the Billboard Hot 100. It proliferated a wave of pop experimentation with its rush of riff changes, echo-chamber effects, and intricate harmonies.

Throughout the summer of 1966, Brian concentrated on finishing the group's next single, "Good Vibrations". It was one of the most complex pop productions ever undertaken, with sessions for the song stretching over months in four major Hollywood studios, and the most expensive single then ever recorded. Simultaneously, Wilson invited session musician and songwriter Van Dyke Parks to collaborate as lyricist for the Beach Boys' next album project, soon titled Smile. Recording lasted from mid-1966 to mid-1967, and followed the same modular production approach as "Good Vibrations". Concurrently, the Beach Boys' planned to launch their own independent label, Brother Records.

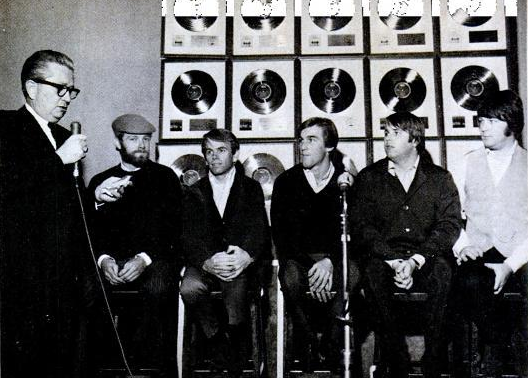
The Beach Boys accepting a gold record sales certification for "Good Vibrations" at the Capitol Tower, late 1966

Released on October 10, 1966, "Good Vibrations" was the Beach Boys' third US number 1 single, reaching the top of the Billboard Hot 100 in December, and became their first number 1 in Britain. The record was their first single certified gold by the RIAA, later being certified triple Platinum. It came to be widely acclaimed as one of the greatest masterpieces of rock music. Over the final quarter of 1966, the Beach Boys were the highest-selling album act in the UK, where for the first time in three years American artists broke the chart dominance of British acts. In December, the Beach Boys were voted the top band in the world in the NME's annual readers' poll, ahead of the Beatles, the Walker Brothers, the Rolling Stones, and the Four Tops.

Throughout the first half of 1967, the release date for Smile was repeatedly postponed as Brian tinkered with the recordings, experimenting with different takes and mixes, and appeared unwilling to supply finished versions of songs. Carl refused to be drafted for military service, leading to indictment and criminal prosecution, which he challenged as a conscientious objector over the next several years. After months of recording and media hype, Smile was shelved for personal, technical, and legal reasons. A February 1967 lawsuit seeking $255,000 (equivalent to $2.46 million in 2025) was launched against Capitol Records over neglected royalty payments. Within the lawsuit was an attempt to terminate the band's contract with Capitol before its November 1969 expiry. Many of Wilson's associates, including Parks, disassociated themselves from the group by April 1967. In the decades following Smile's non-release, it became the most legendary unreleased album in pop music history.

==== Faltered popularity, Brian's reduced involvement, and publishing sale ====
Although Smile had been cancelled, the Beach Boys were still under pressure and a contractual obligation to record and present an album to Capitol. Sessions for the new album lasted from June to July 1967 at Brian's new makeshift home studio. Most of the album featured the Beach Boys playing their own instruments, rather than the session musicians employed in much of their previous work. In July 1967, lead single "Heroes and Villains" was issued, arriving after months of public anticipation, and reached number 12 in US. By then, the group's lawsuit with Capitol was resolved, and it was agreed that Smile would not be the band's next album. In August, the group embarked on a two-date tour of Hawaii. The shows saw Brian make a brief return to live performance, as Bruce Johnston chose to take a temporary break from the band during the summer of 1967, feeling that the atmosphere within the band "had all got too weird".

Smiley Smile was released on September 18, 1967, and peaked at number 41 in the US, making it their worst-selling album to that date. It was the first album for which production was credited to the entire group instead of Brian alone. Critics and fans were generally underwhelmed by the album; according to Scott Schinder, it was released to "general incomprehension". The group was virtually blacklisted by the music press, to the extent that reviews of the group's records were either withheld from publication or published long after the release dates. When released in the UK in November, it performed better, reaching number 9.

When we did Wild Honey, Brian asked me to get more involved in the recording end. He wanted a break [because he] had been doing it all too long.

— Carl Wilson

The Beach Boys immediately recorded a new album, Wild Honey, an excursion into soul music, and a self-conscious attempt to "regroup" themselves as a rock band in opposition to their more orchestral affairs of the past. Released on December 18, 1967, it had a higher chart placing than Smiley Smile, but still failed to make the top-twenty and remained on the charts for only 15 weeks. As with Smiley Smile, contemporary critics viewed it as inconsequential, and it alienated fans whose expectations had been raised by Smile. That month, Mike Love told a British journalist: "Brian has been rethinking our recording program and in any case we all have a much greater say nowadays in what we turn out in the studio."

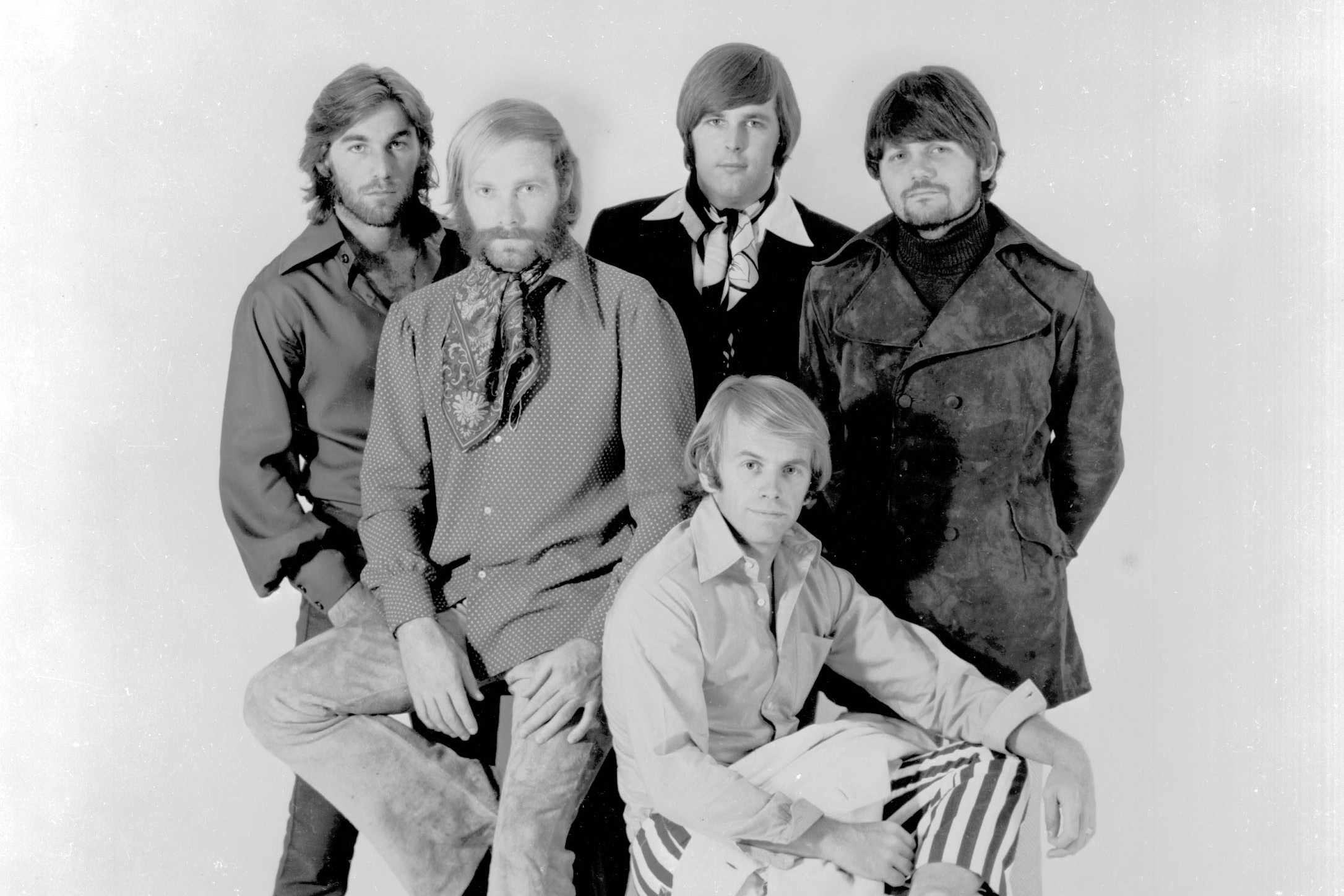
The Beach Boys in 1968; from left: Dennis, Love, Carl (top), Jardine, Bruce Johnston

Onstage, the members stopped wearing their longtime striped-shirt uniforms in favor of matching white, polyester suits that resembled the fashion of a Las Vegas entertainment act. They reached their lowest popularity in the late 1960s and their cultural standing was especially worsened by their public image, which remained incongruous with the prevailing styles of their contemporaries. Capitol continued to bill them as "America's Top Surfin' Group!" and desired for Brian to revert to this direction for the yearly summer markets. After meeting Maharishi Mahesh Yogi at a UNICEF Variety Gala in Paris, Love and other high-profile celebrities such as the Beatles and Donovan traveled to Rishikesh, India, in February–March 1968. The following Beach Boys album, Friends, had songs influenced by the Transcendental Meditation the Maharishi taught. In support of Friends, Love arranged for the Beach Boys to tour with the Maharishi in the US. Starting on May 3, 1968, the tour lasted five shows and was canceled when the Maharishi withdrew to fulfill film contracts. Because of disappointing audience numbers and the Maharishi's withdrawal, 24 tour dates were canceled at a cost estimated at $250,000. Friends, released on June 24, peaked at number 126 in the US.

In July 1968, the group released the single "Do It Again", which lyrically harkened back to their earlier surf songs. Around this time, Brian admitted himself to a psychiatric hospital; his bandmates wrote and produced material in his absence. His songwriting output declined substantially, but the public narrative of "Brian as leader" continued. In August, Capitol issued an album of Beach Boys backing tracks, Stack-o-Tracks. It was the first Beach Boys LP that failed to chart in the US and UK. Released in January 1969, the album 20/20 mixed new material with outtakes and leftovers from recent albums; Brian produced virtually none of the newer recordings.

In April 1969, the band revisited its 1967 lawsuit against Capitol after it alleged an audit revealed the band was owed over $2 million for unpaid royalties and production duties. In May, Brian told the music press that the group's funds were depleted to the point that it was considering filing for bankruptcy at the end of the year, which Disc & Music Echo called "stunning news" and a "tremendous shock on the American pop scene". Brian hoped that the success of a forthcoming single, "Break Away", would mend the financial issues. The song, written and produced by Brian and Murry, reached number 63 in the US and number 6 in the UK, and Brian's remarks to the press ultimately thwarted long-simmering contract negotiations with Deutsche Grammophon.

The group's Capitol contract expired on June 30, 1969 with one more album still due. Live in London, a live album recorded in December 1968, was released in the UK and a few other countries in 1970 to fulfil the contract, although it would not see US release until 1976, under the erroneous re-title Beach Boys '69. After the contract was completed Capitol deleted the Beach Boys' catalog from print, effectively cutting off their royalty flow. The lawsuit was later settled in the Beach Boys' favor and they acquired the rights to their albums from Pet Sounds onwards, while the pre-Pet Sounds records remained with Capitol. In August 1969, Sea of Tunes, the Beach Boys' catalog, was sold to Irving Almo Music for $700,000 (equivalent to $6.15 million in 2025). According to his wife, Marilyn Wilson, Brian was devastated by the sale. Over the years, the catalog generated more than $100 million in publishing royalties, none of which Murry or the band members ever received.

Through his connection with Dennis, the Beach Boys had recorded one song by Charles Manson without Manson's involvement: "Cease to Exist", rewritten as "Never Learn Not to Love", which was released on 20/20. As his cult of followers took over Dennis's home, Dennis gradually distanced himself from Manson. According to author David Leaf, "The entire Wilson family reportedly feared for their lives." In August, the Manson Family committed the Tate–LaBianca murders. According to Jon Parks, the band's tour manager, it was widely suspected in the Hollywood community that Manson was responsible for the murders, and it had been known that Manson had been involved with the Beach Boys, causing the band to be viewed as pariahs for a time. In November, police apprehended Manson, and his connection with the Beach Boys received media attention. He was later convicted for several counts of murder and conspiracy to murder.

=== 1970–1978: Reprise era ===
==== Sunflower, Surf's Up, Carl and the Passions, and Holland ====
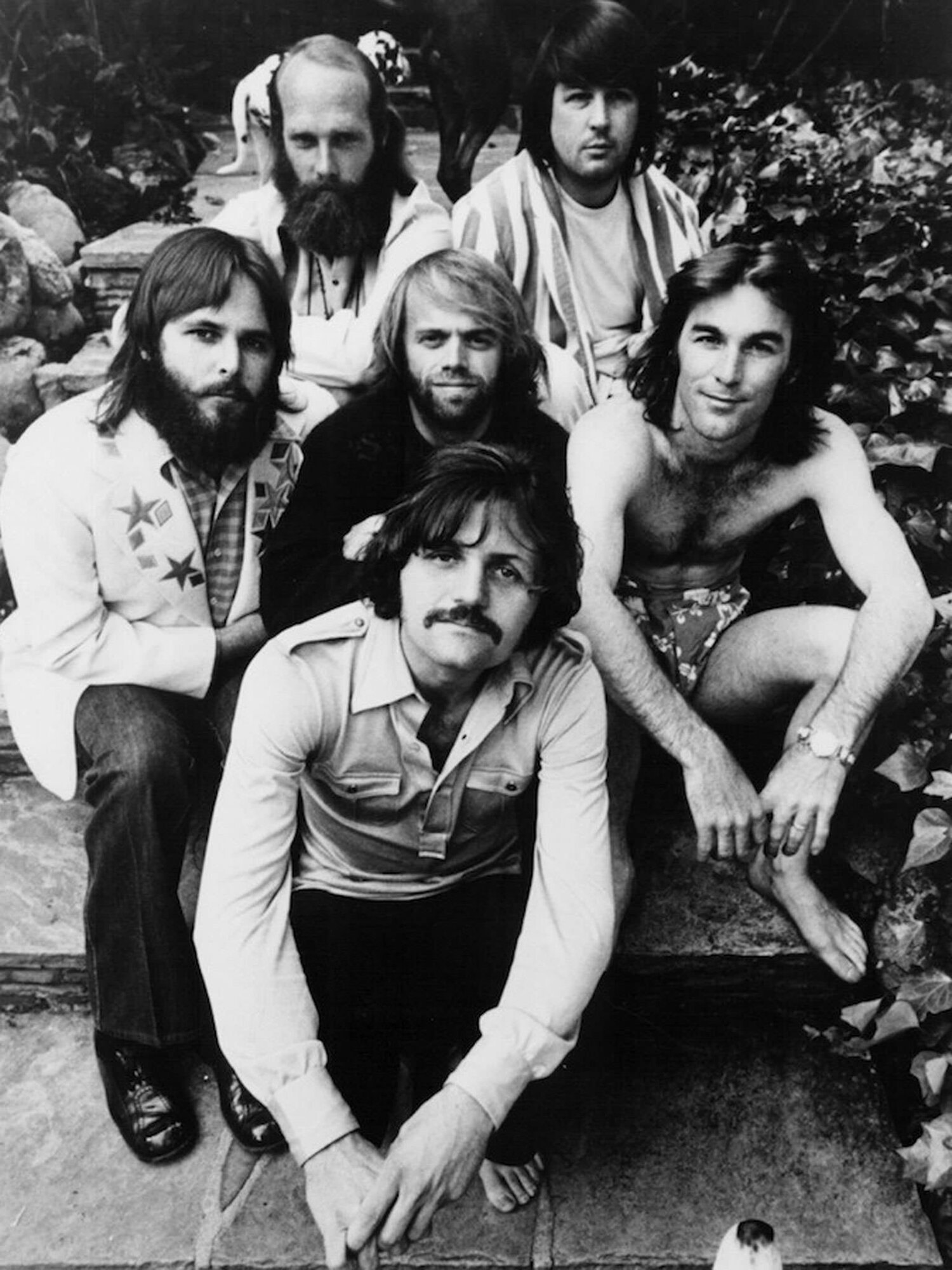
The Beach Boys in 1971; top from left: Love, Brian; middle from left: Carl, Jardine, Dennis; bottom: Johnston

The group was signed to Reprise Records in 1970. Scott Schinder described the label as "probably the hippest and most artist-friendly major label of the time". The deal was brokered by Van Dyke Parks, who was then employed as a multimedia executive at Warner Music Group. Reprise's contract stipulated Brian's proactive involvement with the band in all albums. Their first LP for Reprise, Sunflower, was released on August 31, 1970 and featured a strong group presence with significant writing contributions from all six band members. Brian was active during this period, writing or co-writing seven of Sunflower's 12 songs and performing at half of the band's domestic concerts in 1970. The album received critical acclaim in both the US and the UK.

In early 1970, the Beach Boys hired radio presenter Jack Rieley as their manager. One of his initiatives was to encourage the band to record songs with more socially conscious lyrics. He requested the completion of Smile track "Surf's Up" and arranged a guest appearance at a Grateful Dead concert at Bill Graham's Fillmore East in April 1971 to foreground the Beach Boys' transition into the counterculture. During this time, the group ceased wearing matching uniforms on stage, while Dennis starred alongside James Taylor, Laurie Bird, and Warren Oates in the film Two-Lane Blacktop, released in 1971. In July, the American music press rated the Beach Boys "the hottest grossing act" in the country, tied with Grand Funk Railroad. The band filmed a concert for ABC-TV in Central Park, which aired as Good Vibrations from Central Park on August 19.

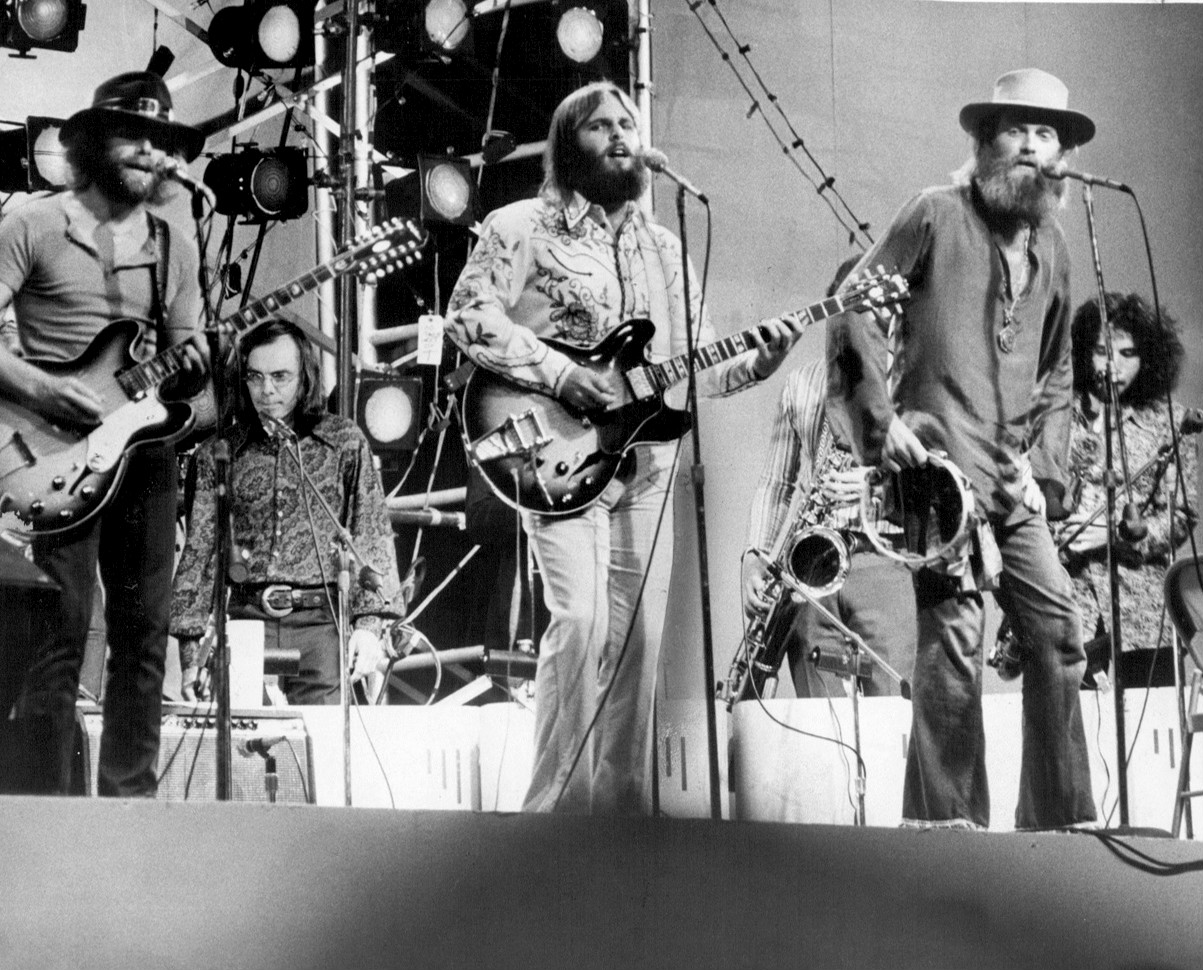
The Beach Boys performing in Central Park, July 1971

On August 30, the band released Surf's Up, which was moderately successful, reaching the US top-thirty, a marked improvement over their recent releases. While the record charted, the Beach Boys added to their renewed fame by performing a near-sellout set at Carnegie Hall; their live shows during this era included reworked arrangements of many of their previous songs, with their set lists culling from Pet Sounds and Smile.

Early 1972 saw the recruitment of two former members of the South African band the Flames, guitarist/singer Blondie Chaplin and drummer/singer Ricky Fataar, into the Beach Boys. Shortly afterwards, Johnston left the band. Rieley said that he fired Johnston at the request of the Wilson brothers; while Johnston himself stated that he quit the band partly due to his unhappiness with Brian's creative withdrawal from the group. The new line-up released Carl and the Passions – "So Tough" in May 1972. The original U.S. release was packaged with a bonus reissue of Pet Sounds. Carl and the Passions was relatively unsuccessful in the U.S., charting at number 50. It was more successful in the UK, where it was issued as a single album without Pet Sounds, peaking at number 25. The next album, Holland, was released in January 1973. Reprise initially rejected the album, feeling it lacked a strong single. Following the intervention of Van Dyke Parks, this resulted in the inclusion of "Sail On, Sailor". Reprise approved, and the resulting album peaked at number 37. Brian's musical children's story, Mount Vernon and Fairway, was included with the album as a bonus EP.

==== Renewed popularity and touring resurgence ====
After Holland, the group maintained a touring regimen, captured on the double live album The Beach Boys in Concert released in November 1973, but recorded very little in the studio through 1975. Following Murry's death in June 1973, Brian retreated into his bedroom and withdrew further into drug abuse, alcoholism, chain smoking, and overeating. In October, the band dismissed Rieley as manager and appointed Mike Love's brother, Stephen, and Chicago manager James William Guercio. Chaplin and Fataar left the band in December 1973 and November 1974, respectively, reducing the band back to the original five members.

The Beach Boys' greatest hits compilation album Endless Summer was released in June 1974 to unexpected success, becoming the band's second number 1 US album in October. The LP had a 155-week chart run, selling over 3 million copies. A second volume of greatest hits, Spirit of America, followed in April 1975, reaching US number 8, being certified Gold, and having a 43-week chart run. The Beach Boys became the number-one act in the US, propelling themselves from opening for Crosby, Stills, Nash and Young in the summer of 1974 to headliners selling out basketball arenas within weeks. Guercio prevailed upon the group to swap out newer songs with older material in their concert setlists, partly to accommodate their growing audience demand for their earlier hits. Later in the year, members of the band appeared as guests on Chicago's hit "Wishing You Were Here". At the end of 1974, Rolling Stone proclaimed the Beach Boys "Band of the Year" based on the strength of their live performances.

To capitalize on their sudden resurgence in popularity, the Beach Boys accepted Guercio's invitation to record their next Reprise album at his Caribou Ranch studio, located around the mountains of Nederland, Colorado. These October 1974 sessions marked the group's return to the studio after a 21-month period of virtual inactivity, but the proceedings were cut short after Brian had insisted on returning to his home in Los Angeles. With the project put on hold, the Beach Boys spent most of the next year on the road playing college football stadiums and basketball arenas. The only Beach Boys recording of 1974 to see release at the time was the Christmas single "Child of Winter", recorded upon the group's return to Los Angeles in November and released the following month.

Over the summer of 1975, the touring group played a co-headlining series of concert dates with Chicago, a pairing that was nicknamed "Beachago". The tour was massively successful and restored the Beach Boys' profitability to what it had been in the mid-1960s. Although another joint tour with Chicago had been planned for the summer of 1976, the Beach Boys' association with Guercio and his Caribou Management company ended in early 1976. (Note: According to Gaines, Guercio may have been fired because members of the group "felt Caribou was being overpaid", although "many observers suggest the Beach Boys followed an old pattern of jettisoning personnel when their financial situation improved". Biographer Mark Dillon states that the tour evaporated due to Dennis' budding romance with Karen Lamm, the ex-wife of Chicago keyboardist Robert Lamm.) Stephen Love subsequently took over as the band's de facto business manager.

==== "Brian Is Back!" and CBS signing ====
Early in 1975, Brian signed a production deal with California Music, a Los Angeles collective that included Bruce Johnston and Gary Usher, but was drawn away by the Beach Boys' pressing demands for a new album. In October, Marilyn persuaded Brian to admit himself to the care of psychologist Eugene Landy, who kept him from indulging in substance abuse with constant supervision. Brian was kept in the program until December 1976. At the end of January 1976, the Beach Boys returned to the studio with Brian producing once again. To promote the group through Brian's recovery and his return to writing and producing, Stephen launched a media campaign that adopted the tagline "Brian Is Back!" and paid the Rogers & Cowan publicity agency $3,500 per month to implement it. The band also commissioned an NBC-TV special, later known as The Beach Boys: It's OK!, that was produced by NBC's Saturday Night creator Lorne Michaels.

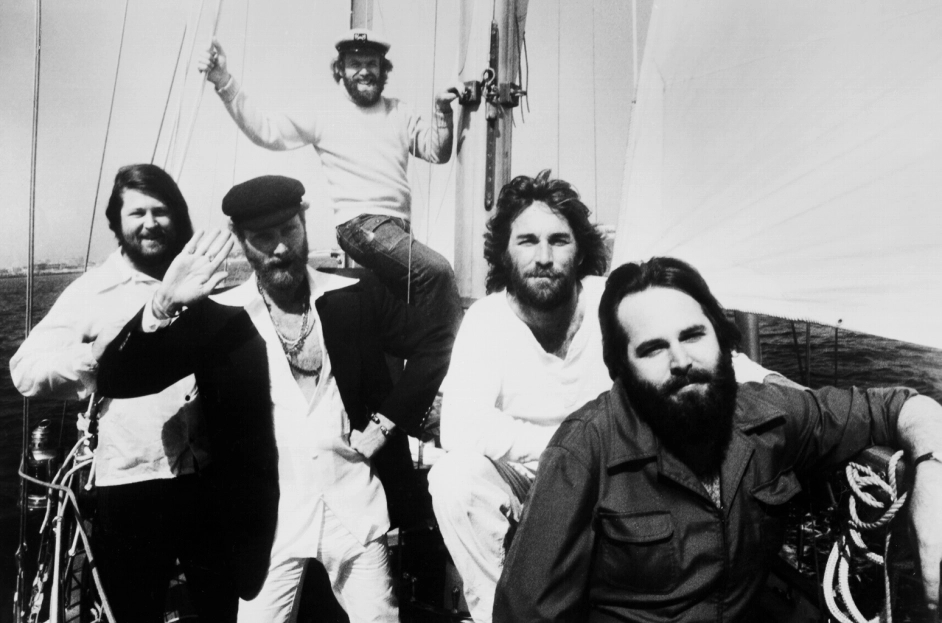
The Beach Boys sailing in Dennis' boat, mid-1976; from left: Brian, Love, Jardine, Dennis, Carl

Released on July 5, 1976, 15 Big Ones was generally disliked by fans and critics, as well as Carl and Dennis, who disparaged the album to the press. The album peaked at number 8 in the US, becoming their first top-ten album of new material since Pet Sounds, and their highest-charting studio album since Summer Days (And Summer Nights!!). Lead single "Rock and Roll Music" peaked at number 5 – their highest chart ranking since "Good Vibrations".

From late-1976 to early-1977, Brian made sporadic public appearances and produced the band's next album, The Beach Boys Love You. He regarded it as a spiritual successor to Pet Sounds, namely because of the autobiographical lyrics. Released on April 11, 1977, Love You peaked at number 53 in the US and number 28 in the UK. Critically, it was widely praised, though it initially met with polarized reactions from the public. Adult/Child, the intended follow-up to Love You, was completed, but withheld from release. Following this period, his concert appearances with the band gradually diminished and their performances were occasionally erratic.

At the beginning of 1977, the Beach Boys had enjoyed their most lucrative concert tours ever, with the band playing in packed stadiums and earning up to $150,000 per show. Concurrently, the band was the subject of a record company bidding war, as their contract with Warner Bros. had been set to expire soon. Stephen Love arranged for the Beach Boys to sign an $8 million deal with CBS Records on March 1. Numerous stipulations were given in the CBS contract, including that Brian was required to write at least four songs per album, co-write at least 70% of all the tracks, and produce or co-produce alongside his brothers. Another part of the deal required the group to play thirty concerts a year in the U.S., in addition to one tour in Australia and Japan, and two tours in Europe. The first Beach Boys-related release on CBS was Dennis' solo album Pacific Ocean Blue, issued in 1977.

Within weeks of the CBS contract, the band dismissed Stephen as their manager, replaced by Carl's associate Henry Lazarus, an entertainment business owner that had no prior experience in the music industry. Lazarus arranged a major European tour for the Beach Boys, starting in late July, with stops in Germany, Switzerland, and France. Due to poor planning, the tour was cancelled shortly before it began. The band dismissed Lazarus and were sued by many of the concert promoters, with losses of $200,000 in preliminary expenses and $550,000 in potential revenue.

In July, the Beach Boys played a concert at Wembley Stadium before Mike attacked Brian with a piano bench onstage in front of over 15,000 attendees. (Note: Love later explained that he had been "in a state of extreme sensitivity" after learning that his girlfriend was in a vegetative state following "a horrific car accident".) In August, Mike and Jardine persuaded Stephen to return as the group's manager, a decision that Carl and Dennis had strongly opposed. By this point, the band had effectively split into two camps; Dennis and Carl on one side, and Mike and Jardine on the other, with Brian remaining neutral. The internal wrangling came to a head in September, with Dennis declaring to a Rolling Stone journalist that he had left the band. The group was broken up until a meeting at Brian's house on September 17. In light of the lucrative CBS contract, the parties negotiated a settlement resulting in Love gaining control of Brian's vote in the group, allowing Love and Jardine to outvote Carl and Dennis on any matter.

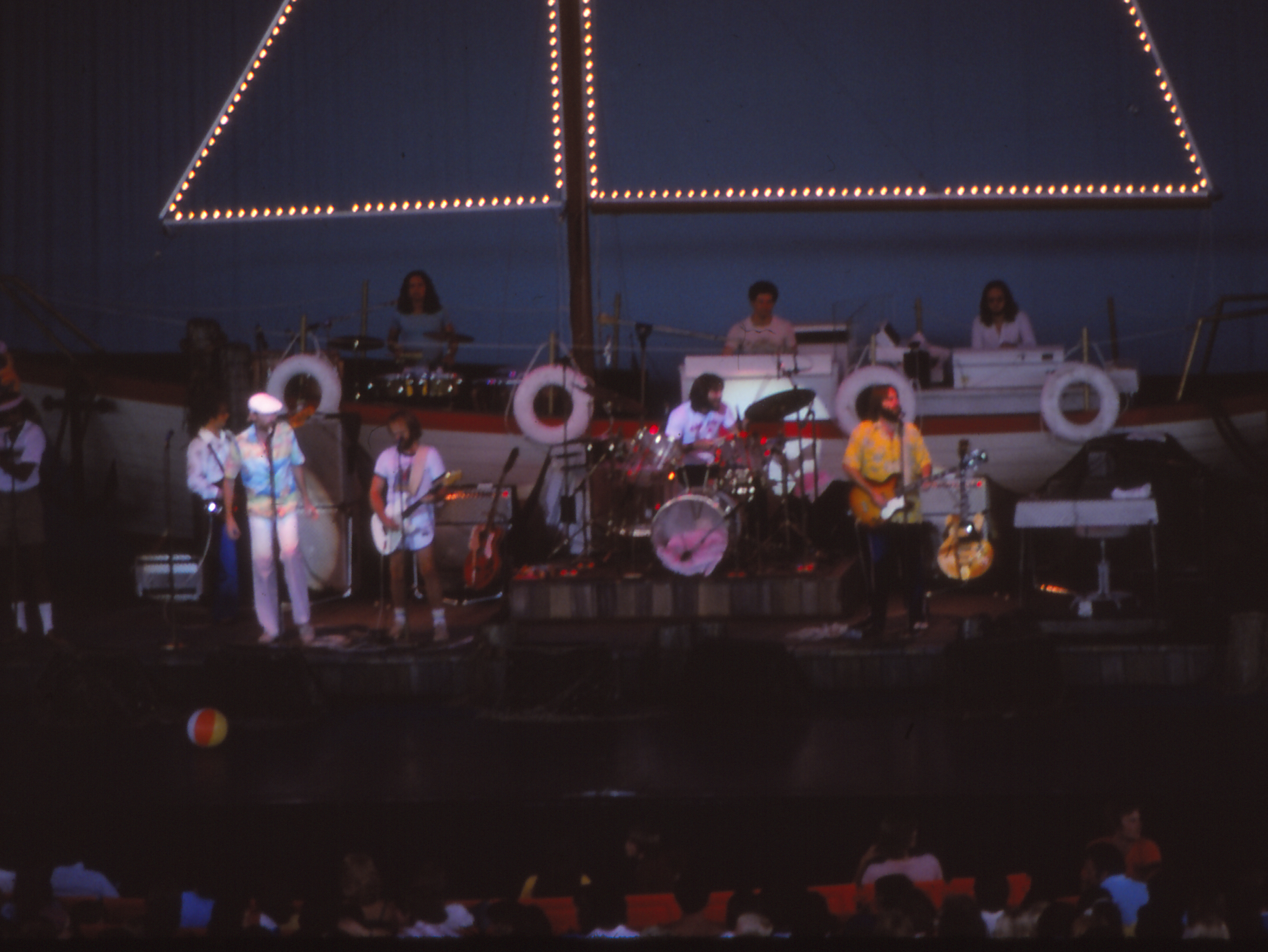
The Beach Boys performing a concert in Michigan, August 1978

The group had still owed one more album for Reprise. Released in September 1978, M.I.U. Album was recorded at Maharishi International University in Iowa at the suggestion of Love. The band originally attempted to record a Christmas album, to be titled Merry Christmas from the Beach Boys, but this idea was rejected by Reprise. Dennis and Carl made limited contributions to M.I.U. Album; the album was produced by Jardine and Ron Altbach, with Brian credited as "executive producer". Dennis retreated from the group to focus on his second solo album, Bambu, which was shelved just as alcoholism and marital problems overcame all three Wilson brothers.

=== 1978–1996: Continued recording, death of Dennis, and Brian's estrangement ===
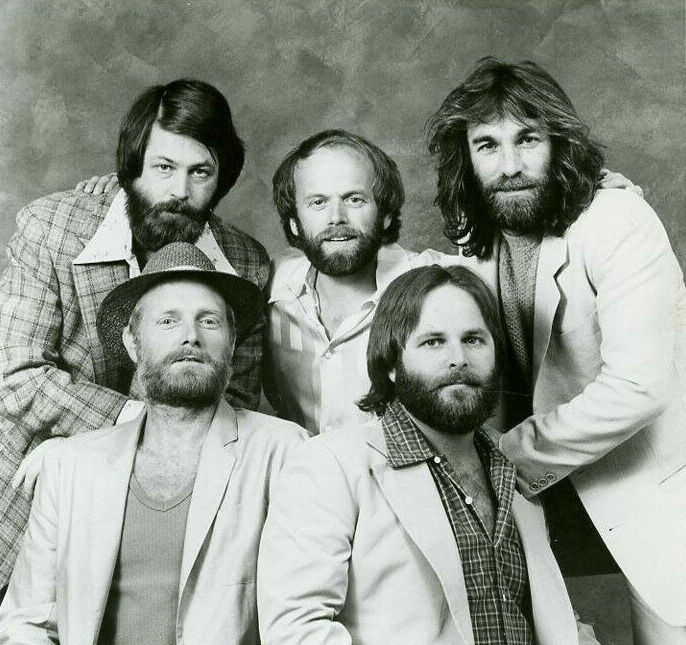
The Beach Boys in 1979

The group's first two albums for CBS, 1979's L.A. (Light Album) and 1980's Keepin' the Summer Alive, struggled in the US, charting at 100 and 75 respectively, though the band did manage a top-forty single from L.A. (Light Album) with "Good Timin'". The recording of these albums saw Bruce Johnston return to the band, initially solely as a producer and eventually as a full-time band member. In-between the two albums, the group contributed the song "It's a Beautiful Day" to the soundtrack of the film Americathon.

[T]he last two years have been the most important and difficult time of our career. We were at the ultimate crossroads. We had to decide whether what we had been involved in since we were teenagers had lost its meaning. We asked ourselves and each other the difficult questions we'd often avoided in the past.

— Carl Wilson, April 1980

In the 1980s, the Beach Boys transitioned into an oldies act and spent the next several years touring, often playing in front of large audiences, and recording songs for film soundtracks and various artists compilations. On June 21, 1980, they performed a concert at Knebworth, England, later released in 2002 as a live album titled Good Timin': Live at Knebworth England 1980. In 1981, the band scored a surprise US top-twenty hit when their cover of the Del-Vikings' "Come Go with Me", from the three year old M.I.U. Album, was released as a single from Ten Years of Harmony, a double compilation album focusing on the Reprise and CBS years.

Carl temporarily left the touring group in 1981 due to unhappiness with the band's nostalgia format and lackluster live performances. He recorded and released his first solo album Carl Wilson that year. (Note: Carl stated: "I haven't quit the Beach Boys but I do not plan on touring with them until they decide that 1981 means as much to them as 1961.") He returned in May 1982, after approximately 14 months of being away, on the condition that the group reconsider their rehearsal and touring policies and refrain from "Las Vegas-type" engagements.

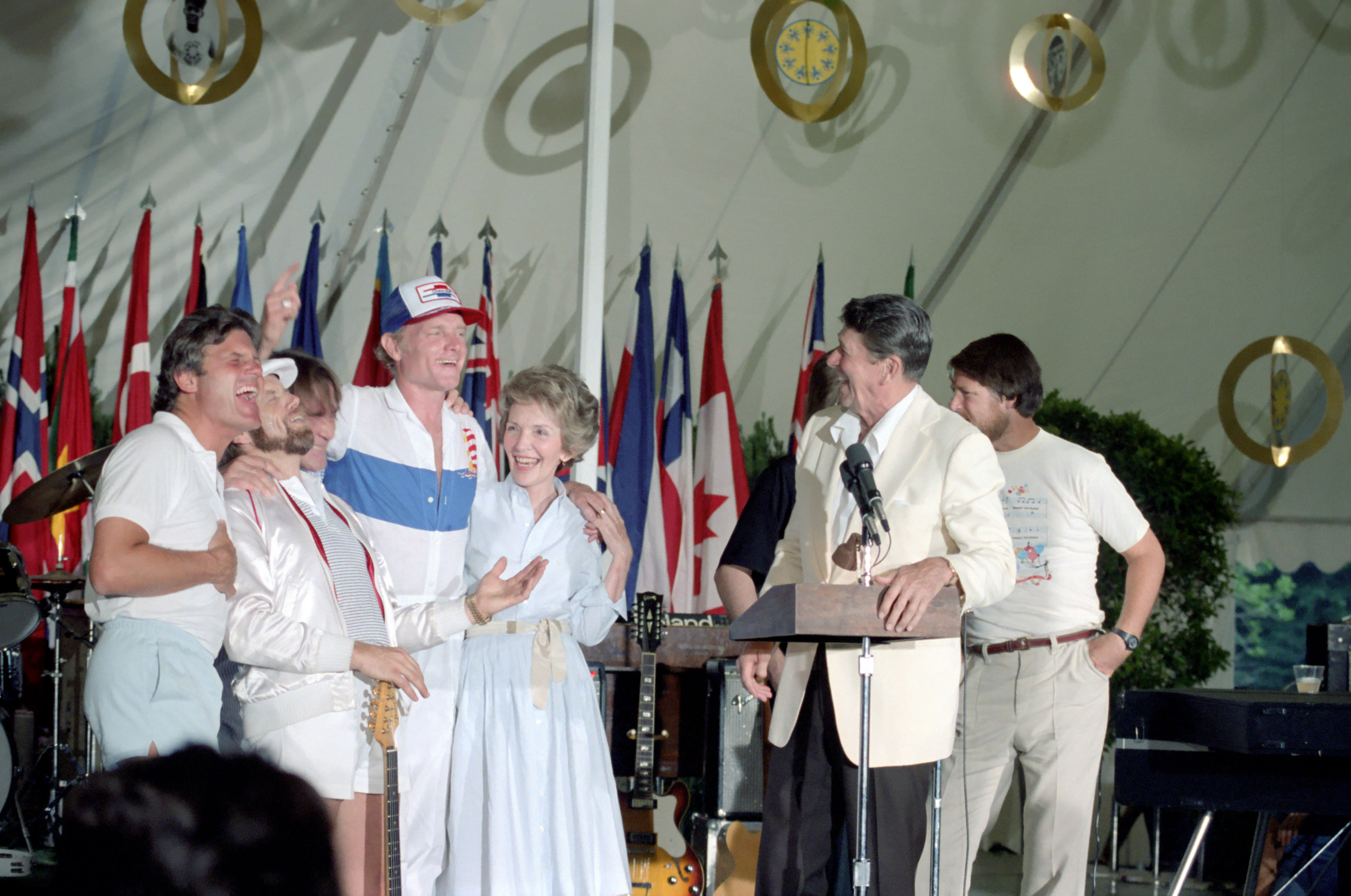
The Beach Boys with President Ronald Reagan and First Lady Nancy Reagan at the White House, June 1983

In late 1982, Eugene Landy was hired once more as Brian's therapist and subsequently restored his physical health, slimming down from 311 pounds (141 kg) to 185 pounds (84 kg). By 1983, tensions between Dennis and Love escalated to the point that each filed a restraining order against the other. On December 28, Dennis drowned at the age of 39 in Marina del Rey while diving from a friend's boat trying to recover items that he had previously thrown overboard in a fit of rage.

Produced by Steve Levine, their 1985 self-titled album proved a modest success, becoming their highest-charting album in the U.S. since 15 Big Ones. It was the band's last album for CBS, as they returned to Capitol in 1986 with a 25th anniversary greatest hits album, Made in U.S.A, which went double platinum. In 1988, the Beach Boys claimed their first US number 1 single in 22 years with "Kokomo", which topped the chart for one week. The track was included on the band's next studio album, 1989's Still Cruisin', which went platinum in the US. During that period, Brian was largely absent during the recording sessions and tour dates due to the recording of his debut solo album Brian Wilson and conflicts between the band and Landy.

Love filed a defamation lawsuit against Brian due to how he was presented in Brian's 1992 memoir Wouldn't It Be Nice: My Own Story. Its publisher HarperCollins settled the suit for $1.5 million. He later wrote that the suit allowed his lawyer "to gain access to the transcripts of Brian's interviews with his [book] collaborator, Todd Gold. Those interviews affirmed—according to Brian—that I had been the inspiration of the group and that I had written many of the songs that [would soon be] in dispute." Other defamation lawsuits were filed by Carl, Brother Records, and the Wilsons' mother Audree. With Love and Brian unable to determine exactly what Love was properly owed in royalties and songwriting credits, Love sued Brian in 1992, awarding him $5 million and a share of future royalties from Wilson. Thirty-five of the group's songs were then amended to credit Love.

After dissolving his relationship with Landy, Brian phoned Sire Records staff producer Andy Paley to collaborate on new material tentatively for the Beach Boys. After losing the songwriting credits lawsuit with Love, Brian told MOJO in February 1995: "Mike and I are just cool. There's a lot of shit Andy and I got written for him. I just had to get through that goddamn trial!" In April, it was unclear whether the project would turn into a Wilson solo album, a Beach Boys album, or a combination of the two. The project ultimately disintegrated. Instead, Brian and his bandmates recorded Stars and Stripes Vol. 1, an album of country music stars covering Beach Boys songs, with co-production helmed by River North Records owner Joe Thomas. After the release, Brian became completely estranged from the band and would not work with them again until 2011.

=== 1997–present: Love-led tours and occasional reunions ===
==== Carl's death and name litigation ====
In 1997, Carl was diagnosed with lung and brain cancer. Despite his terminal condition, he performed with the band on its summer tour (a double-bill with Chicago) while undergoing chemotherapy. During performances, he sat on a stool and needed oxygen after each song. When Carl became too unwell to perform in late 1997, David Marks returned as lead guitarist. Carl died on February 6, 1998, aged 51, two months after the death of the Wilsons' mother, Audree.

After Carl's death, Jardine quit the band. His final appearance with the band for more than a decade occurred on May 9, 1998, which was the final official Beach Boys show performed before the license dispute. During the dispute, Love, Johnston, and Marks toured as "The California Beach Band". (Note: It was previously believed they did so as "America's Band", but this was disproven) After Love secured a license from BRI, he, Johnston and Marks continued touring as the Beach Boys from July 4, 1998. At the time, Brian was also offered the license, but declined. Jardine began to perform regularly with his band "Beach Boys: Family & Friends" until he ran into legal issues for using the name without license. Jardine sued Love, claiming he had been excluded from their concerts. Brother Records, Inc. (BRI), through its attorney, Ed McPherson, sued Jardine. Jardine counter-claimed against BRI for wrongful termination. Courts ruled in Love's favor, denying Jardine use of the Beach Boys name. Jardine appealed, and sought $4 million in damages. The California Court of Appeal ruled that "Love acted wrongfully in freezing Jardine out of touring under the Beach Boys name", allowing Jardine to continue with his lawsuit. The case was settled outside of court with the terms undisclosed. Marks quit the band again in 1999, due to a diagnosis of hepatitis C; after which Love and Johnston continued touring without him.

In 2000, ABC premiered a miniseries, The Beach Boys: An American Family, that dramatized the Beach Boys' story. It was criticized by numerous parties, including Brian, for inaccuracies.

The late 1990s had brought Beach Boys archival albums including Ultimate Christmas and the Grammy-nominated 4-CD box set The Pet Sounds Sessions, while the 2003 greatest hits album Sounds of Summer: The Very Best of the Beach Boys made the U.S. top 20 and achieved multi-platinum sales. In 2004, Wilson recorded and released his solo album Brian Wilson Presents Smile, a reinterpretation of the unfinished Smile project. That September, Wilson issued a free CD through the Mail On Sunday that included Beach Boys songs he had rerecorded, five of which he co-authored with Love. The 10-track compilation had 2.6 million copies distributed and prompted Love to file a lawsuit in 2005; he claimed the promotion hurt sales of the original recordings and his image was used for the CD. Wilson's wife Melinda alleged that, during the deposition, Love turned to Wilson and remarked: "you better start writing a real big hit because you're going to have to write me a real big check". Love's suit was dismissed in 2007 when a judge determined there were no triable issues and the case was without merit.

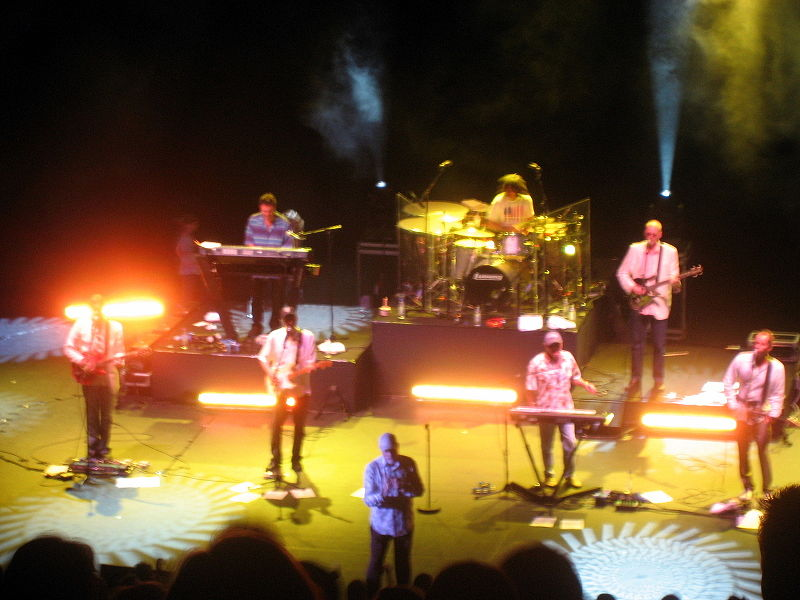
The touring lineup of Mike Love and Bruce Johnston's "The Beach Boys Band", with David Marks, in 2008

On June 13, 2006, Brian Wilson, Love, Jardine, Marks, and Johnston participated in a non-performing reunion atop the Capitol Records Building to celebrate that Sounds of Summer had been certified double-platinum. Later that year, Jardine joined Wilson and his band for a tour celebrating the 40th anniversary of Pet Sounds. In 2008, Marks briefly reunited with Love and Johnston's touring band for a tour of Europe.

In 2010, Jardine released A Postcard from California, his debut solo album. The album features contributions from Brian, Johnston, Marks, and Love, as well as a posthumous feature from Carl and other guest appearances. Also in 2010, Brian and Jardine sang on "We Are the World 25 for Haiti", a new recording of "We Are the World", to benefit the population of Haiti.

==== 2011–2012 reunion and aftermath ====
Jardine made his first appearance with the Beach Boys touring band in more than 10 years in 2011 at a tribute concert for Ronald Reagan's 100th birthday. On October 31 that year, The Smile Sessions box set was released, featuring comprehensive session highlights and outtakes from the original 1966-1967 Smile recordings. It received virtually unanimous critical acclaim upon release. It was ranked number 381 in Rolling Stone's 2012 list of the greatest albums of all time and won the Grammy Award for Best Historical Album at the 2013 Grammy Awards.

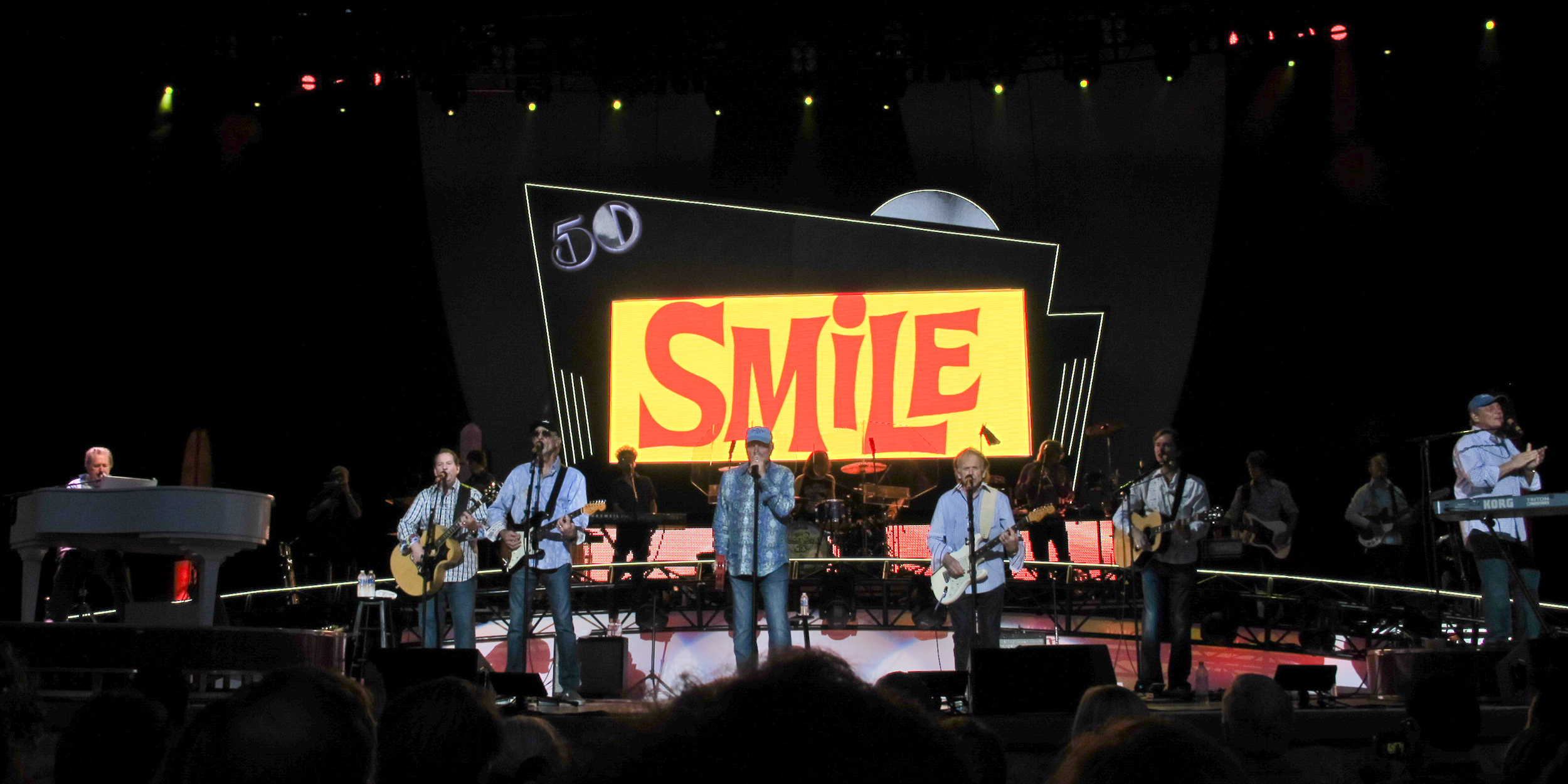
The reunited Beach Boys performing "Heroes and Villains" in May 2012

On December 16, 2011, it was announced that Wilson, Love, Jardine, Johnston, and Marks would reunite for a new album and 50th anniversary tour. On February 12, 2012, the Beach Boys performed at the 2012 Grammy Awards. It marked the group's first live performance to include Wilson since 1996, Jardine since 1998, and Marks since 1999. A new studio album, That's Why God Made the Radio, was released on July 5; it debuted at number 3 on the Billboard 200, expanding the group's span of top-ten albums there across 49 years and one week, passing the Beatles with 47 years of top-ten albums. Critics generally regarded the album as an "uneven" collection, with most of the praise centered on its closing musical suite.

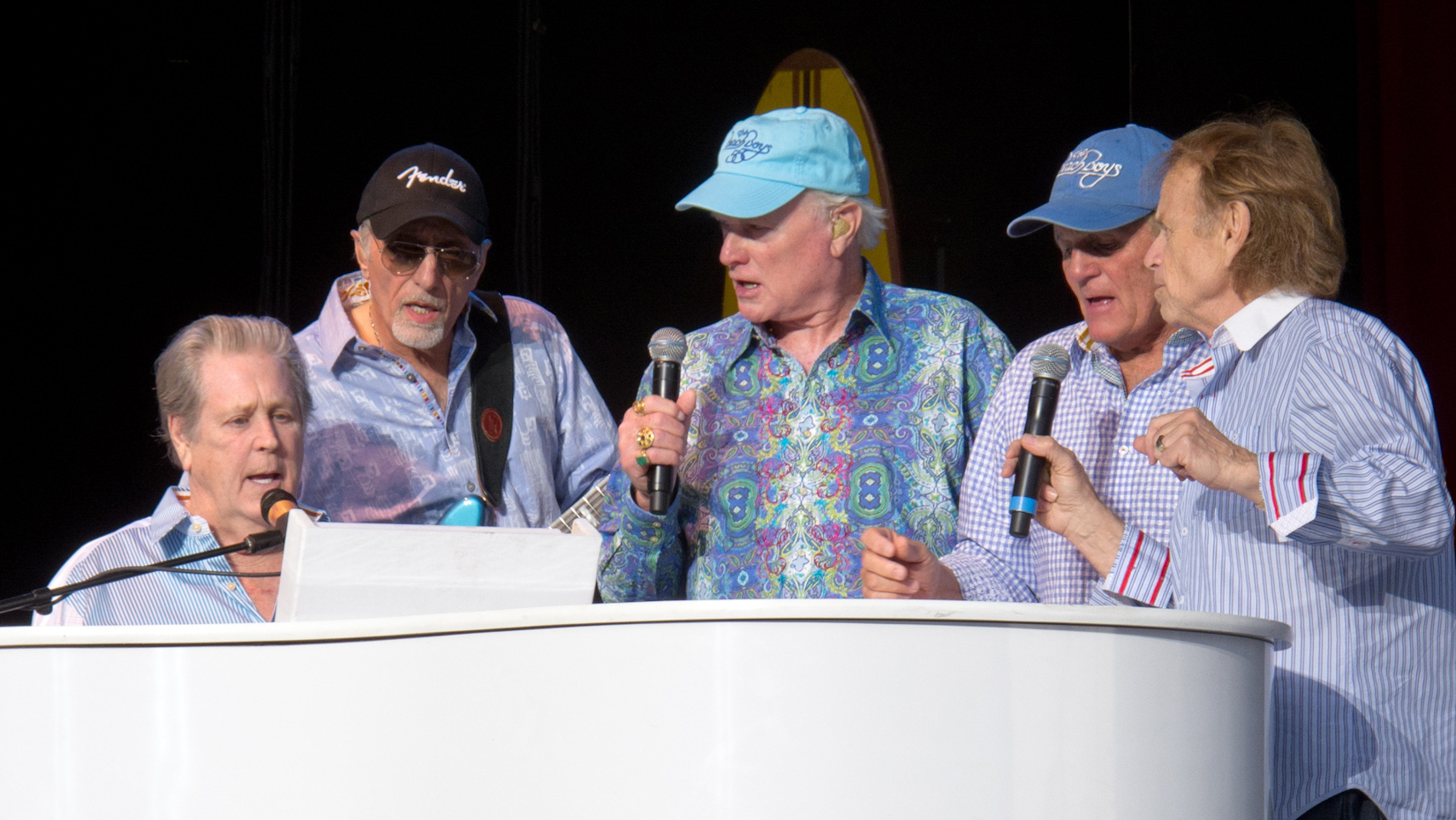
Brian, Marks, Love, Johnston and Jardine performing together in May 2012.

Ultimately, the reunion tour ended in September 2012 as planned, after a final show on September 28, but amid rumors that Love had dismissed Wilson from the Beach Boys. Love and Johnston continued to perform under the Beach Boys name, while Wilson, Jardine, and Marks toured as a trio in 2013, and a subsequent tour with guitarist Jeff Beck also included Blondie Chaplin at select dates. Wilson and Jardine continued to tour together in 2014 and following years, often joined by Chaplin; Marks declined to join them after 2013 and would occasionally perform with Love and Johnston as a guest from 2014 until 2016.

No Pier Pressure, Brian's solo album for April 2015, marked another collaboration between him and Joe Thomas, featuring guest appearances from Jardine, Marks and Chaplin. In February 2014, Love, Jardine, Marks and Johnston appeared together at the 2014 Ella Awards Ceremony, where Love was honored for his work as a singer. In April, when asked if he was interested in making music with Love again, Wilson said he was not, adding in July that he "doesn't talk to the Beach Boys [or] Mike Love". In December, Soundstage aired an episode featuring Wilson performing with Jardine, Chaplin and Ricky Fataar at The Venetian in Las Vegas.

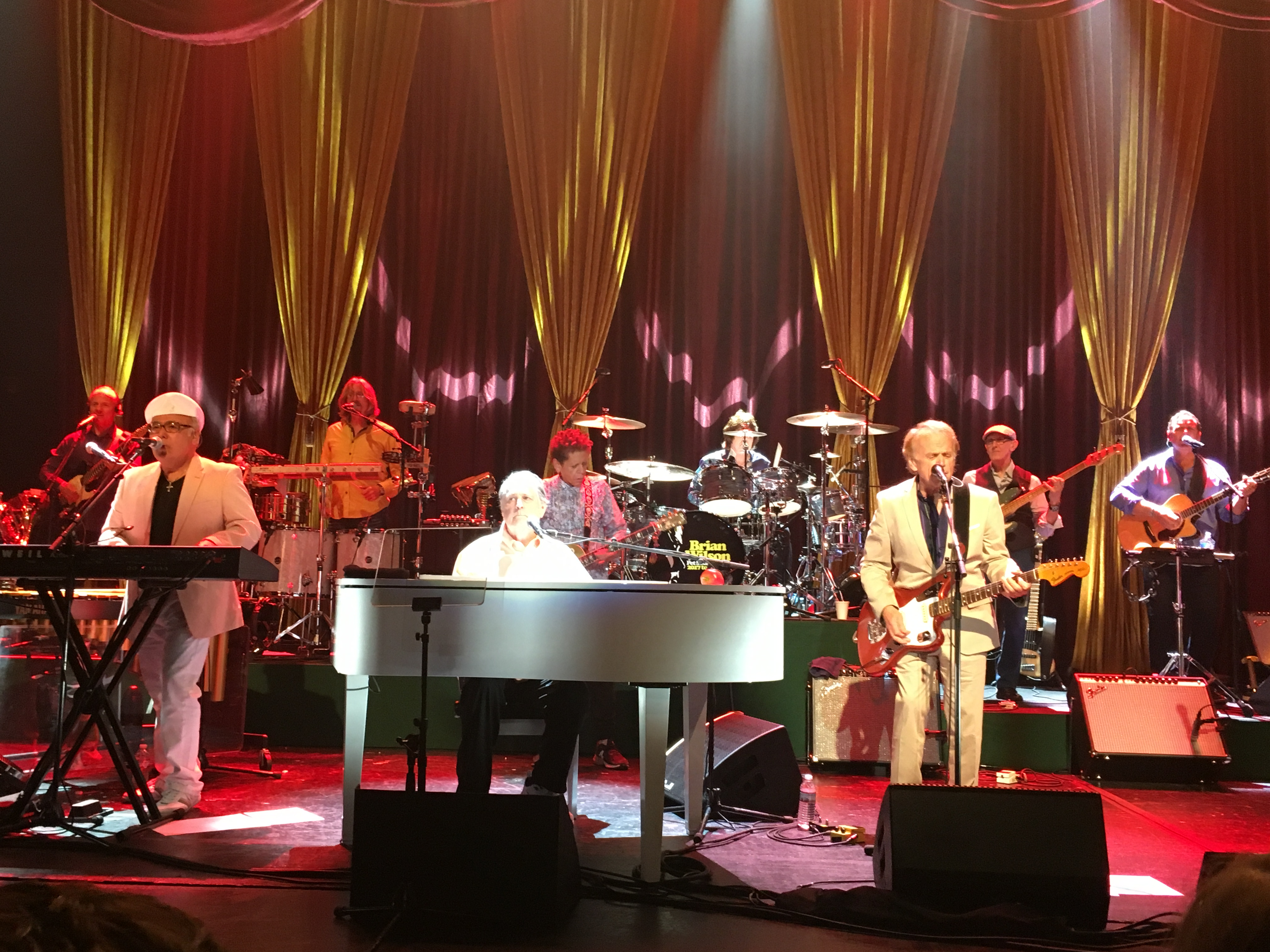
Wilson, Jardine and Blondie Chaplin performing with the Brian Wilson Band in 2017

In 2016, Wilson and Jardine embarked on the Pet Sounds 50th Anniversary World Tour, promoted as Wilson's final performances of the album, with Chaplin appearing as a special guest at all dates on select songs. Chaplin would become an official part of the band later that year. That same year, Love and Wilson each published memoirs, Good Vibrations: My Life as a Beach Boy and I Am Brian Wilson, respectively. Asked about negative comments that Wilson made about him in the book, Love challenged the legitimacy of statements attributed to Wilson in the book and in the press. In an interview with Rolling Stone conducted in June 2016, Wilson said he would like to try to repair his relationship with Love and collaborate with him again. In January 2017, Love said: "If it were possible to make it just Brian and I, and have it under control and done better than what happened in 2012, then yeah, I'd be open to something."

In July 2018, Wilson, Jardine, Love, Johnston, and Marks reunited for a one-off Q&A session moderated by director Rob Reiner at the Capitol Records Building in Los Angeles. It was the first time the band had appeared together in public since their 2012 tour. That December, Love described his new holiday album, Reason for the Season, as a "message to Brian" and said that he "would love nothing more than to get together with Brian and do some music". In 2019, Wilson, Jardine and Chaplin embarked on a co-headlining tour with the Zombies, performing selections from Friends and Surf's Up.

In February 2020, Wilson and Jardine's official social media pages encouraged fans to boycott the band's music after it was announced that Love's Beach Boys would perform at the Safari Club International Convention in Reno, Nevada on animal rights grounds. The concert proceeded despite online protests, as Love issued a statement that said his group has always supported "freedom of thought and expression as a fundamental tenet of our rights as Americans". In October, Love and Johnston's Beach Boys performed at a fundraiser for Donald Trump's 2020 presidential campaign; Wilson and Jardine again issued a statement that they had not been informed about this performance and did not support it.

==== Intellectual property sale, further box set releases, Brian's death and Love's health struggles ====
In February 2021, it was announced that Brian Wilson, Love, Jardine, and the estate of Carl Wilson had sold a majority stake in the band's intellectual property to Irving Azoff and his new company, Iconic Artists Group. In April, Omnivore Recordings released the album California Music Presents Add Some Music, featuring Love, Jardine, Marks, Johnston, and several of their children. That August, Capitol released the Feel Flows box set, comprising sessions from Sunflower and Surf's Up. Capitol succeeded this in December 2022 with the Sail On Sailor box set, this time focusing on Carl and the Passions and Holland.

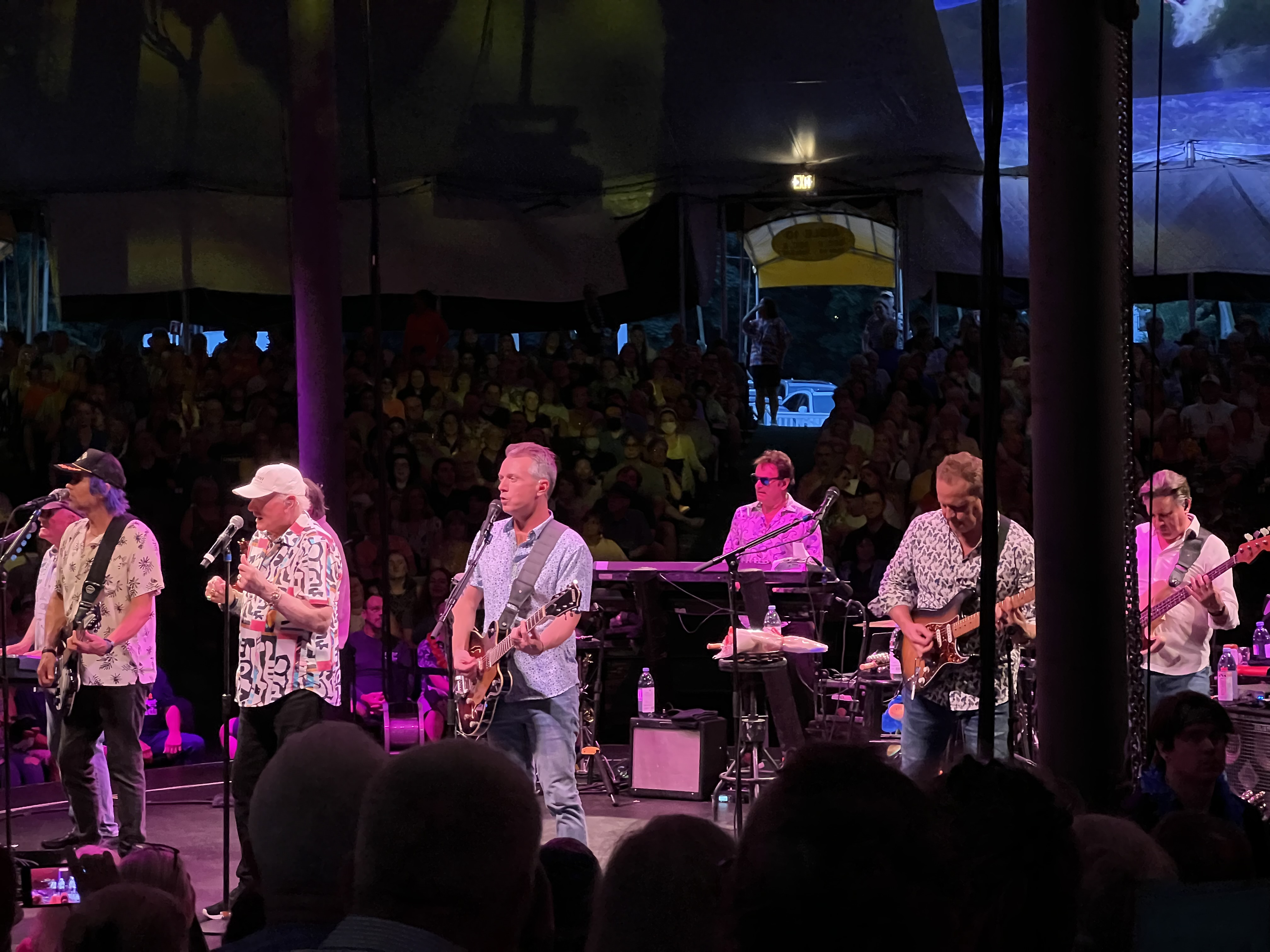
The Beach Boys touring band in 2024

On February 8, 2023, A Grammy Salute to the Beach Boys was recorded at the Dolby Theatre in Hollywood, California and subsequently aired as a two-hour special on CBS on April 9. Wilson, Jardine, Marks, Johnston, and Love attended the concert as non-performers. According to Billboard, the program had 5.18 million viewers. Directed by Frank Marshall and Thom Zimny, a new self-titled band documentary was released by Disney+ in 2024 and included new interviews from members of the band and footage from a private reunion of Wilson, Love, Jardine, Marks, and Johnston at Paradise Cove. They and Chaplin also participated in a non-performing reunion at the documentary's premiere on May 24, 2024.

After Wilson retired from touring in 2022, Jardine reformed Wilson's supporting band as the Pet Sounds Band for a series of concert tours starting in 2025. Wilson died of respiratory arrest on June 11, 2025, at the age of 82. On February 13, 2026, Capitol issued the We Gotta Groove box set, focusing on 15 Big Ones, The Beach Boys Love You, and the aborted Adult/Child album. On March 4, Johnston announced that he was quitting the Beach Boys again in order to focus on his solo career, though said that he would appear with the band on special occasions, making Love the only official member to tour with the band. On May 11, Love, Jardine, and Johnston participated in a non-performing reunion in the Capitol Records Building to celebrate the 60th anniversary of Pet Sounds.

Love began experiencing health issues in mid-2026, which led to the Beach Boys canceling or rescheduling concerts. Variety noted that Love was a "less robust presence on stage" when the band performed a series of concerts at the Hollywood Bowl in early July. On July 23, Love's Instagram account posted a message stating the Beach Boys would be taking time off from the road until September to "recharge". In September, the band's scheduled tour dates for that month were canceled, raising further concerns about Love's health. On October 10, the band performed their first public concert since July. Love, who was walked onstage and sat for the duration of the show, was described as "alarmingly frail" by Rolling Stone and sang only occasional backing vocals.

On October 11, 2026, Love's Beach Boys played a concert in Nashville, Tennessee, while Jardine and the Pet Sounds Band performed in Cerritos, California. Jardine was joined onstage by guests Johnston, Marks, Dean Torrence, Marilyn Wilson, and Carnie Wilson. This was Jardine's first performance with Johnston since 2014, and with Torrence since 2010.

In a statement released through New York Times on October 22, Love confirmed that he was currently attending a rehab facility, and added that he hoped to "get back to the music and the best fans in the world." On the same day, Jardine played a concert in the Northridge neighborhood of Los Angeles, and was joined again by special guest Marks as well as Stephen Kalinich and Wendy Wilson.

On October 28, the Beach Boys pulled out of their planned November 11 and 12 performances at the Epcot International Food & Wine Festival, and were replaced by John Stamos and the California Sound, a band featuring the same musicians from Love's band. On November 9, the band canceled their last scheduled concert for 2026, set for Bristol, Virginia on November 13; with only one concert, described as a "makeup date" in Alberta, Canada, scheduled for 2027.

== Musical style and development ==
In Understanding Rock: Essays in Musical Analysis, musicologist Daniel Harrison writes:

Even from their inception, the Beach Boys were an experimental group. They combined, as Jim Miller has put it, "the instrumental sleekness of the Ventures, the lyric sophistication of Chuck Berry, and the vocal expertise of some weird cross between the Lettermen and Frankie Lymon and the Teenagers" with lyrics whose images, idioms, and concerns were drawn from the rarefied world of the middle-class white male southern California teenager. ... [But] it was the profound vocal virtuosity of the group, coupled with the obsessional drive and compositional ambitions of their leader, Brian Wilson, that promised their survival after the eventual breaking of fad fever. ... Comparison to other vocally oriented rock groups, such as the Association, shows the Beach Boys' technique to be far superior, almost embarrassingly so. They were so confident of their ability, and of Brian's skill as a producer to enhance it, that they were unafraid of doing sophisticated, a cappella glee-club arrangements containing multiple suspensions, passing formations, complex chords, and both chromatic and enharmonic modulations.

The Beach Boys began as a garage band playing 1950s style rock and roll, reassembling styles of music such as surf to include vocal jazz harmony, which created their unique sound. In addition, they introduced their signature approach to common genres such as the pop ballad by applying harmonic or formal twists. Among the distinct elements of the Beach Boys' style were the nasal quality of their singing voices, their use of a falsetto harmony over a driving, locomotive-like melody, and the sudden chiming in of the whole group on a key line. Brian Wilson handled most stages of the group's recording process from the beginning, even though he was not properly credited on earlier recordings.

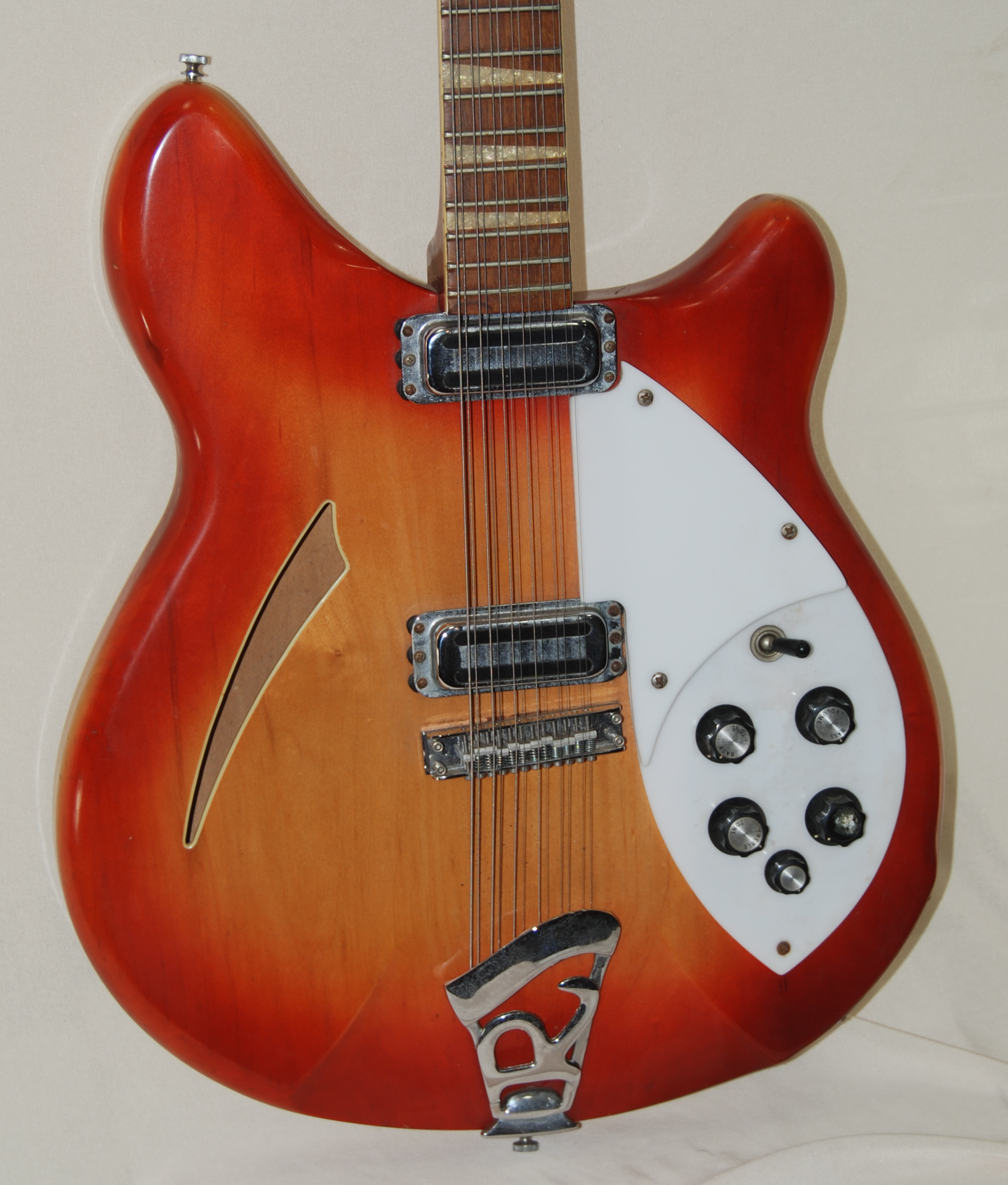
A Rickenbacker 360/12 identical to the 12-string guitar used by Carl Wilson in the early to mid-1960s

Early on, Mike Love sang lead vocals in the rock-oriented songs, while Carl contributed guitar lines on the group's ballads. Jim Miller commented: "On straight rockers they sang tight harmonies behind Love's lead ... on ballads, Brian played his falsetto off against lush, jazz-tinged voicings, often using (for rock) unorthodox harmonic structures." Harrison adds that "even the least distinguished of the Beach Boys' early uptempo rock 'n' roll songs show traces of structural complexity at some level; Brian was simply too curious and experimental to leave convention alone". Although Brian was often dubbed a perfectionist, he was an inexperienced musician, and his understanding of music was mostly self-taught. At the lyric stage, he usually worked with Love, whose assertive persona provided youthful swagger that contrasted Brian's explorations in romanticism and sensitivity. Luis Sanchez noted a pattern where Brian would spare surfing imagery when working with collaborators outside of his band's circle, in the examples "Lonely Sea" and "In My Room".

Brian's bandmates resented the notion that he was the sole creative force in the group. In a 1966 article that asked if "the Beach Boys rely too much on sound genius Brian", Carl said that although Brian was the most responsible for their music, every member of the group contributed ideas. Mike Love wrote: "As far as I was concerned, Brian was a genius, deserving of that recognition. But the rest of us were seen as nameless components in Brian's music machine ... It didn't feel to us as if we were just riding on Brian's coattails." Conversely, Dennis defended Brian's stature in the band, stating: "Brian Wilson is the Beach Boys. He is the band. We're his fucking messengers. He is all of it. Period. We're nothing. He's everything."

=== Influences ===
The band's earliest influences came primarily from the work of Chuck Berry and the Four Freshmen. Performed by the Four Freshmen, "Their Hearts Were Full of Spring" (1961) was a particular favorite of the group. By analyzing their arrangements of pop standards, Brian educated himself on jazz harmony. Philip Lambert noted: "If Bob Flanigan helped teach Brian how to sing, then Gershwin, Kern, Porter, and the other members of this pantheon helped him learn how to craft a song." Other general influences on the group included the Hi-Lo's, the Penguins, the Robins, Bill Haley & His Comets, Otis Williams, the Cadets, the Everly Brothers, the Shirelles, the Regents, and the Crystals.

Though the Beach Boys are often caricatured as the ultimate white, suburban act, black R&B was crucial to their sound.

— Geoffrey Himes

The eclectic mix of white and black vocal group influences – ranging from the rock and roll of Berry, the jazz harmonies of the Four Freshmen, the pop of the Four Preps, the folk of the Kingston Trio, the R&B of groups like the Coasters and the Five Satins, and the doo wop of Dion and the Belmonts – helped contribute to the Beach Boys' uniqueness in American popular music. Carl remembered that Love was "really immersed in doo-wop" and likely "influenced Brian to listen to it", adding that the "black artists were so much better in terms of rock records in those days that the white records almost sounded like put-ons".

Another significant influence on Brian's work was Burt Bacharach. He said in the 1960s: "Burt Bacharach and Hal David are more like me. They're also the best pop team – per se – today. As a producer, Bacharach has a very fresh, new approach." Regarding surf rock pioneer Dick Dale, Brian said that his influence on the group was limited to Carl and his style of guitar playing. Carl credited Chuck Berry, the Ventures, and John Walker with shaping his guitar style, and that the Beach Boys had learned to play all of the Ventures' songs by ear early in their career.

In 1967, Lou Reed wrote in Aspen that the Beach Boys created a "hybrid sound" out of rock and roll and the Four Freshmen, explaining that such songs as "Let Him Run Wild", "Don't Worry Baby", "I Get Around", and "Fun, Fun, Fun" were not unlike "Peppermint Stick" by the Elchords. Similarly, John Sebastian of the Lovin' Spoonful noted: "Brian had control of this vocal palette of which we had no idea. We had never paid attention to the Four Freshmen or doo-wop combos like the Crew Cuts. Look what gold he mined out of that."

=== Vocals ===
Brian identified each member individually for their vocal range, once detailing the ranges for Carl, Dennis, Jardine ("[they] progress upwards through G, A, and B"), Love ("can go from bass to the E above middle C"), and himself ("I can take the second D in the treble clef"). (Note: Starting with the 1970 sessions for the Surf's Up album, Stephen Desper remembers the emerging corrosive effects of Brian's incessant chain smoking and cocaine use: "He could still do falsettos and stuff, but he'd need Carl to help him. Either that or I'd modify the tape speed-wise to make it artificially higher, so it sounded like the old days.") He declared in 1966 that his greatest interest was to expand modern vocal harmony, owing to his fascination with a voice to the Four Freshmen, which he considered a "groovy sectional sound". He added: "The harmonies that we are able to produce give us a uniqueness which is really the only important thing you can put into records – some quality that no one else has got." For a period, Brian avoided singing falsetto for the group, saying: "I thought people thought I was a fairy ... the band told me, 'If that's the way you sing, don't worry about it.'"

In the group's early recordings, from lowest intervals to highest, the group's vocal harmony stack usually began with Love or Dennis, followed by Jardine or Carl, and finally Brian on top, according to Jardine, while Carl said that the blend was Love on bottom, Carl above, followed by Dennis or Jardine, and then Brian on top. Jardine explains:

We always sang the same vocal intervals. ... As soon as we heard the chords on the piano we'd figure it out pretty easily. If there was a vocal move [Brian] envisioned, he'd show that particular singer that move. We had somewhat photographic memory as far as the vocal parts were concerned so that [was] never a problem for us.

Brian ensured that his vocal arrangements exercised the group's blend of intonation, attack, phrasing, and expression. Sometimes, he would sing each vocal harmony part alone through multi-track tape.

[Love] had a hand in a lot of the arrangements. He would bring out the funkier approaches, whether to go shoo-boo-bop or bom-bom-did-di-did-did. It makes a big difference, because it can change the whole rhythm, the whole color and tone of it.

— Carl Wilson

On the group's blend, Carl said: "[Love] has a beautifully rich, very full-sounding bass voice. Yet his lead singing is real nasal, real punk. [Jardine]'s voice has a bright timbre to it; it really cuts. My voice has a kind of calm sound. We're big oooh-ers; we love to oooh. It's a big, full sound, that's very pleasing to us; it opens up the heart." Rock critic Erik Davis wrote: "The 'purity' of tone and genetic proximity that smoothed their voices was almost creepy, pseudo-castrato, [and] a 'barbershop' sound." Jimmy Webb said: "They used very little vibrato and sing in very straight tones. The voices all lie down beside each other very easily – there's no bumping between them because the pitch is very precise." Writer Richard Goldstein reported that, according to a fellow journalist who asked Brian about the black roots of his music, Brian's response was: "We're white and we sing white." Goldstein added that when he asked where his approach to vocal harmonies had derived from, Wilson answered: 'Barbershop'."

=== Use of studio musicians ===
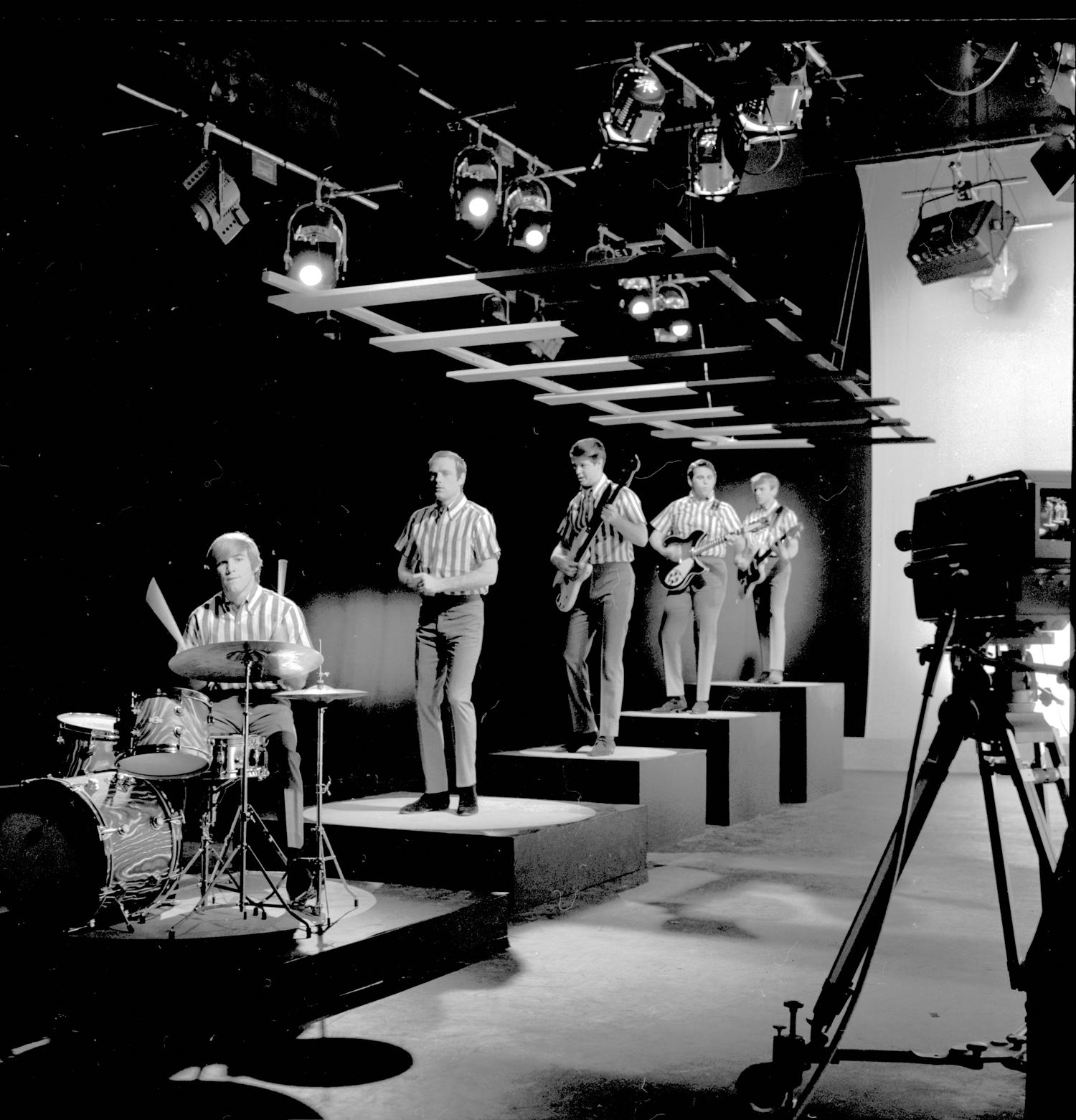
The Beach Boys performing in 1964

Biographer James Murphy said: "By most contemporary accounts, they were not a very good live band when they started. ... The Beach Boys learned to play as a band in front of live audiences", eventually to become "one of the best and enduring live bands". With only a few exceptions, the Beach Boys played every instrument heard on their first four albums and first five singles. Music critic Richie Unterberger believed that "Before session musicians took over most of the parts, the Beach Boys could play respectably gutsy surf rock as a self-contained unit."

As Wilson's arrangements increased in complexity, he began employing a group of professional studio musicians, later known as "the Wrecking Crew", to assist with recording the instrumentation on select tracks. According to some reports, these musicians then completely replaced the Beach Boys on the backing tracks to their records. Much of the relevant documentation, while accounting for the attendance of unionized session players, had failed to record the presence of the Beach Boys themselves. These documents, along with the full unedited studio session tapes, were not available for public scrutiny until the 1990s.

Wilson started occasionally employing members of the Wrecking Crew for certain Beach Boys tracks during the 1963 Surfer Girl sessions – specifically, on two songs, "Hawaii" and "Our Car Club". The 1964 albums Shut Down Volume 2 and All Summer Long featured the Beach Boys themselves playing the vast majority of the instruments while occasionally being augmented by outside musicians. It is commonly misreported that Dennis in particular was replaced by Hal Blaine on drums. Dennis's drumming is documented on a number of the group's singles, including 1964's "I Get Around", "Fun, Fun, Fun", and "Don't Worry Baby". Starting with the 1965 albums Today! and Summer Days, Brian used the Wrecking Crew with greater frequency, "but still", Stebbins writes, "the Beach Boys continued to play the instruments on many of the key tracks and single releases".

Overall, the Beach Boys played the instruments on the majority of their recordings from the decade, with 1966 and 1967 being the only years when Wilson used the Wrecking Crew almost exclusively. Pet Sounds and Smile are their only albums in which the backing tracks were largely played by studio musicians. After 1967, the band's use of studio musicians was considerably reduced. Wrecking Crew biographer Kent Hartman supported in his 2012 book about the musicians: "Though [Brian Wilson] had for several months brought in various session players on a sporadic, potluck basis to supplement things, the other Beach Boys generally played on the earliest songs, too."

The source of the longstanding controversy regarding the Beach Boys' use of studio musicians largely derives from a misinterpreted statement in Leaf's 1978 biography The Beach Boys and the California Myth, later bolstered by erroneous recollections from participants of the recording sessions. (Note: The statement in question was: "from 1963 through 1966 Brian used studio musicians on the instrumental tracks".) Starting in the 1990s, unedited studio session tapes, along with American Federation of Musicians (AFM) sheets and tape logs, were leaked. Music historian Craig Slowinski, who contributes musician credits to the liner notes of the band's reissues and compilations, wrote in 2006: "[O]nce the vaults were opened up and the tapes were studied, the true situation became clear: the Boys themselves played most of the instruments on their records until the Beach Boys Today! album in early 1965." Slowinski goes on to note: "when painting a picture of a Beach Boys recording session, it's important to examine both the AFM contracts and the session tapes, either of which may be incomplete on their own".

During the period when Brian relied heavily on studio musicians, Carl was an exception among the Beach Boys in that he played alongside the studio musicians whenever he was available to attend sessions. In Slowinski's view, "One should not sell short Carl's own contributions; the youngest Wilson had developed as a musician sufficiently to play alongside the horde of high-dollar session pros that big brother was now bringing into the studio. Carl's guitar playing [was] a key ingredient." (Note: Carl's lead and rhythm guitar playing is featured on several of the band's singles, including "I Get Around", "Fun, Fun, Fun", "Don't Worry Baby", "When I Grow Up (To Be A Man)", "Do You Wanna Dance?", and "Dance, Dance, Dance".)

=== Spirituality ===
The band members often reflected on the spiritual nature of their music (and music in general), particularly for the recording of Pet Sounds and Smile. Even though the Wilsons did not grow up in a particularly religious household, Carl was described as "the most truly religious person I know" by Brian, and Carl was forthcoming about the group's spiritual beliefs stating: "We believe in God as a kind of universal consciousness. God is love. God is you. God is me. God is everything right here in this room. It's a spiritual concept which inspires a great deal of our music." Carl told Rave magazine in 1967 that the group's influences are of a "religious nature", but not any religion in specific, only "an idea based upon that of Universal Consciousness. ... The spiritual concept of happiness and doing good to others is extremely important to the lyric of our songs, and the religious element of some of the better church music is also contained within some of our new work."

During the recording of Pet Sounds, Brian held prayer meetings, later reflecting that "God was with us the whole time we were doing this record ... I could feel that feeling in my brain." In 1966, he explained that he wanted to move into a white spiritual sound, and predicted that the rest of the music industry would follow suit. In 2011, Brian maintained the spirituality was important to his music, and that he did not follow any particular religion.

Carl said that Smile was chosen as an album title because of its connection to the group's spiritual beliefs. Brian referred to Smile as his "teenage symphony to God", composing a hymn, "Our Prayer", as the album's opening spiritual invocation. Experimentation with psychotropic substances also proved pivotal to the group's development as artists. He spoke of his LSD trips as a "religious experience", and during a session for "Our Prayer", Brian can be heard asking the other Beach Boys: "Do you guys feel any acid yet?". In 1968, the group's interest in transcendental meditation led them to record the original song, "Transcendental Meditation".

== Legacy ==
=== Achievements ===
The Beach Boys are one of the most critically acclaimed, commercially successful, and influential bands of all time. A central figure in the history of rock music, the group's early songs made them major pop stars in the U.S., the UK, Australia and other countries, having seven U.S. top 10 singles between April 1963 and November 1964. They were one of the first American groups to exhibit the definitive traits of a self-contained rock band, playing their own instruments and writing their own songs, one of the first rock groups to exert autonomy over their recording sessions, and one of the few American bands formed prior to the 1964 British Invasion to continue their success.

By the end of their original tenure with Capitol in 1969, they had sold 65 million records worldwide, closing the 1960s as the most commercially successful American group in popular music. Between the 1960s and 2020s, they had 37 songs reach the US Top 40 (the most by an American group) with four topping the Billboard Hot 100; they also hold Nielsen SoundScan's record as the top-selling American band for albums and singles. As of 2016, they had sold over 100 million records worldwide.

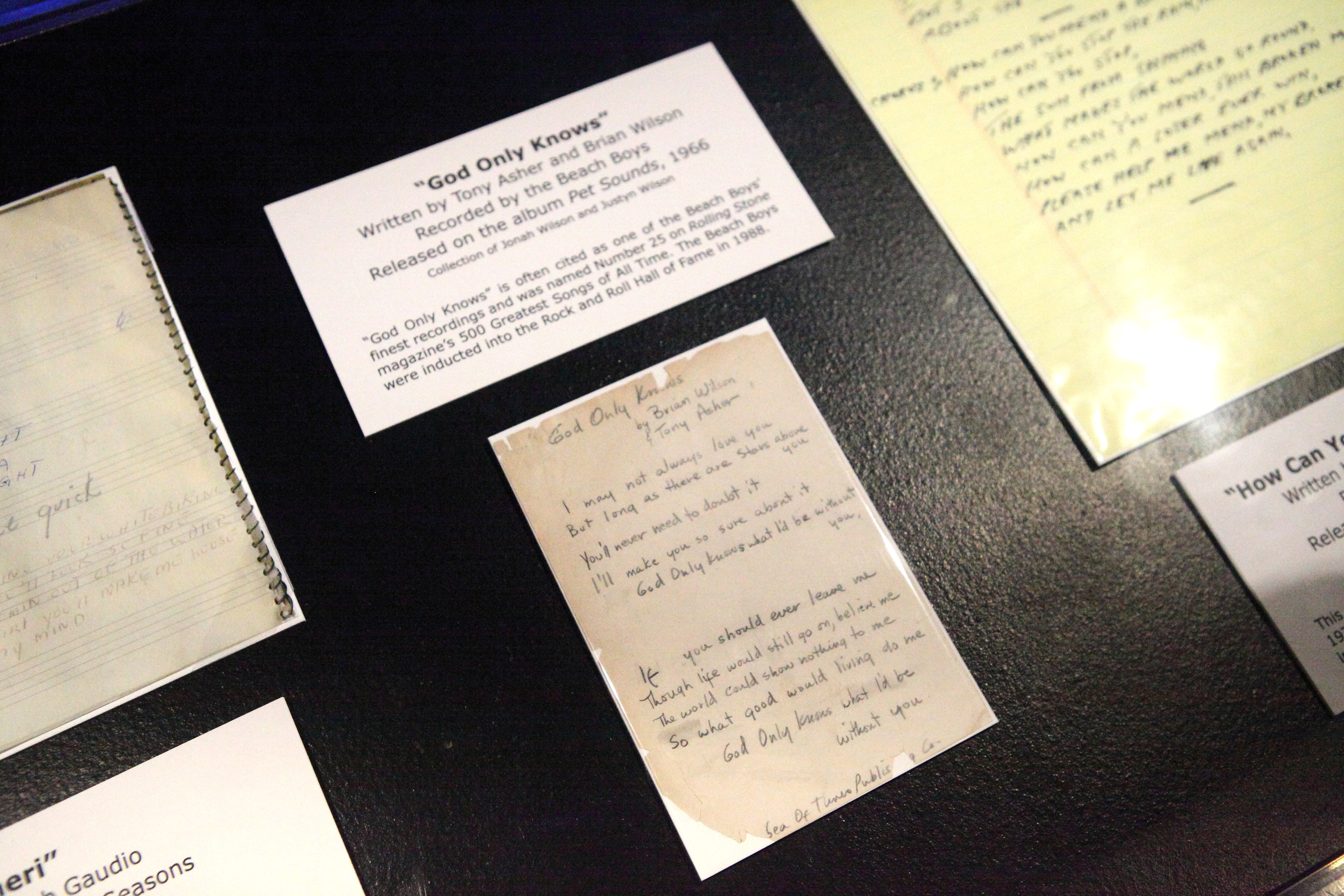
A manuscript of "God Only Knows" displayed in the Rock and Roll Hall of Fame in Cleveland

In 1988, the original five members (the Wilson brothers, Love, and Jardine) were inducted into the Rock and Roll Hall of Fame. Ten years later, they were selected for the Vocal Group Hall of Fame. In 2004, Pet Sounds was preserved in the National Recording Registry by the Library of Congress for being "culturally, historically, or aesthetically significant". Their recordings of "In My Room", "Good Vibrations", "California Girls" and the entire Pet Sounds album have been inducted into the Grammy Hall of Fame.

The Beach Boys are one of the most influential acts of the rock era. In 2003, Rolling Stone ranked Pet Sounds at number two on the magazine's list of the greatest albums of all time, a position it retained on the list's later remakes and revisions in 2012, 2020, and 2023. (Note: Other Beach Boys albums ranked in these lists included The Beach Boys Today!, Wild Honey, and The Smile Sessions.) In 2017, a study of AllMusic's catalog indicated the Beach Boys as the sixth most frequently cited artist influence in its database. In 2021, the staff of Ultimate Classic Rock ranked the Beach Boys as the top American band of all time; the publication's editor wrote in the group's entry that "few bands ... have had a greater impact on popular music".

=== California sound ===
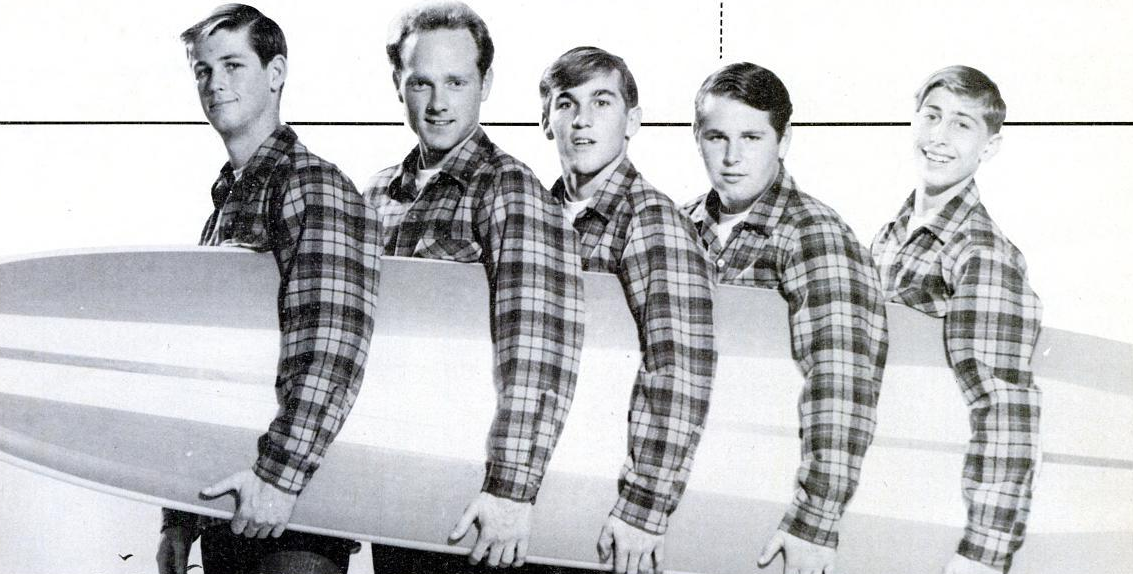
The Beach Boys appearing in a 1963 Billboard advertisement

Professor of cultural studies James M. Curtis wrote in 1987:

We can say that the Beach Boys represent the outlook and values of white Protestant Anglo-Saxon teenagers in the early sixties. Having said that, we immediately realize that they must mean much more than this. Their stability, their staying power, and their ability to attract new fans prove as much.

Historian Kevin Starr explains that the group first connected with young Americans specifically for their lyrical interpretation of a mythologized landscape: "Cars and the beach, surfing, the California Girl, all this fused in the alembic of youth: Here was a way of life, an iconography, already half-released into the chords and multiple tracks of a new sound." In critic Robert Christgau's opinion, "the Beach Boys were a touchstone for real rock and rollers, all of whom understood that the music had its most essential roots in an innocently hedonistic materialism".

The group's "California sound" grew to prominence through the success of their 1963 album Surfin' U.S.A., which helped turn the surfing subculture into a mainstream youth-targeted advertising image exploited by the film, television, and food industry. The group's surf music was not entirely their invention, being preceded by artists such as Dick Dale. However, previous surf musicians did not project a world view as the Beach Boys did. The band's earlier surf music helped raise the profile of California, creating its first major regional style with national significance, and establishing a musical identity for Southern California, as opposed to Hollywood. California supplanted New York as the center of popular music thanks to the success of Brian's productions.

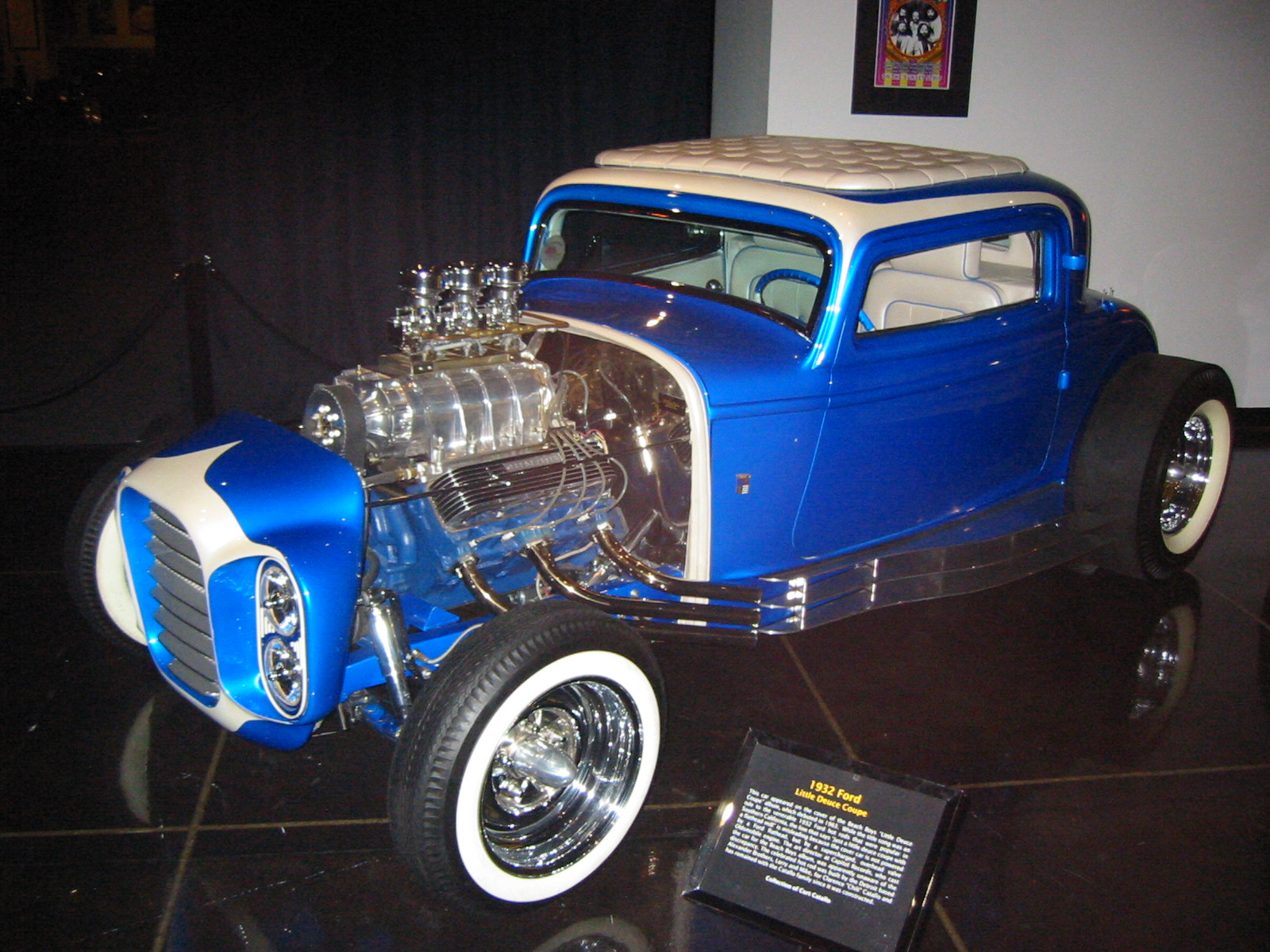
The titular 1932 Ford that appeared on the cover to the platinum certified album Little Deuce Coupe

A 1966 article discussing trends in rock music writes that the Beach Boys popularized a type of drum beat heard in Jan and Dean's "Surf City", which sounds like "a locomotive getting up speed", in addition to the method of "suddenly stopping in between the chorus and verse". Pete Townshend of the Who coined the term "power pop", which he defined as "what we play—what the Small Faces used to play, and the kind of pop the Beach Boys played in the days of 'Fun, Fun, Fun' which I preferred".

The California sound evolved to reflect a more musically ambitious and mature worldview, becoming less to do with surfing and cars and more about social consciousness and political awareness. Throughout the 1960s, it fueled innovation and transition, inspiring artists to tackle largely unmentioned themes such as sexual freedom, black pride, drugs, oppositional politics, other countercultural motifs, and war. Soft pop, later known as "sunshine pop", derived in part from this movement. Sunshine pop producers imitated the orchestral style of Pet Sounds; however, the Beach Boys were rarely representative of the genre, which was rooted in easy listening and advertising jingles.

By the end of the 1960s, the California sound declined due to a combination of the West Coast's cultural shifts, Wilson's psychological downturn, and the Manson murders, with David Howard calling it the "sunset of the original California Sunshine Sound ... [the] sweetness advocated by the California Myth had led to chilling darkness and unsightly rot". Drawing from the Beach Boys' associations with Manson and former California governor Ronald Reagan, Erik Davis remarked: "The Beach Boys may be the only bridge between those deranged poles. There is a wider range of political and aesthetic sentiments in their records than in any other band in those heady times—like the state [of California], they expand and bloat and contradict themselves."

During the 1970s, advertising jingles and imagery were predominately based on the Beach Boys' early music and image. The group inspired the development of the West Coast style later dubbed "yacht rock". According to Jacobin's Dan O'Sullivan, the band's aesthetic was the first to be "scavenged" by yacht rock acts like Rupert Holmes. O'Sullivan cites the Beach Boys' recording of "Sloop John B" as the origin of yacht rock's preoccupation with the "sailors and beachgoers" aesthetic that was "lifted by everyone, from Christopher Cross to Eric Carmen, from 'Buffalo Springfield' folksters like Jim Messina to 'Philly Sound' rockers like Hall & Oates".

=== Innovations ===
Pet Sounds informed the development of pop, rock, jazz, electronic, experimental, punk, and hip-hop. Similar to subsequent experimental rock LPs by Frank Zappa, the Beatles, and the Who, Pet Sounds featured countertextural aspects that called attention to the very recordedness of the album. Professor John Robert Greene stated that the album broke new ground and took rock music away from its casual lyrics and melodic structures into then uncharted territory. He called it one factor which spawned the majority of trends in post-1965 rock music, the only others being Rubber Soul, the Beatles' Revolver, and the contemporary folk movement. The album was the first in popular music to incorporate the Electro-Theremin, an easier-to-play version of the theremin, as well as the first in rock music to feature a theremin-like instrument. With Pet Sounds, they were the first group to make an entire album that departed from the usual small-ensemble electric rock band format.

According to David Leaf in 1978, Pet Sounds and Good Vibrations "established the group as the leaders of a new type of pop music, Art Rock". Academic Bill Martin states that the band opened a path in rock music "that went from Sgt. Pepper's to Close to the Edge and beyond". He argues that the advancing technology of multitrack recording and mixing boards were more influential to experimental rock than electronic instruments such as the synthesizer, allowing the Beatles and Beach Boys to become the first crop of non-classically trained musicians to create extended and complex compositions. In Strange Sounds: Offbeat Instruments and Sonic Experiments in Pop, Mark Brend writes:

Other artists and producers, notably the Beatles and Phil Spector, had used varied instrumentation and multi-tracking to create complex studio productions before. And others, like Roy Orbison, had written complicated pop songs before. But "Good Vibrations" eclipsed all that came before it, in both its complexity as a production and the liberties it took with conventional notions of how to structure a pop song.

The production of "Good Vibrations" was unprecedented in any prior genre or recording; Carlin wrote that it "sounded like nothing that had ever been played on the radio before". It contained previously untried mixes of instruments, and was the first successful pop song to have cellos in a juddering rhythm. Charlie Gillett called it "one of the first records to flaunt studio production as a quality in its own right, rather than as a means of presenting a performance". Brian used Electro-Theremin for the track. Upon release, the single prompted an unexpected revival in theremins while increasing awareness of analog synthesizers, leading Moog Music to produce their own brand of ribbon-controlled instruments. (Note: Even though the Electro-Theremin was not technically a theremin, the song became the most frequently cited example of the theremin in pop music.) In a 1968 editorial for Jazz & Pop, Gene Sculatti predicted that the song "may yet prove to be the most significantly revolutionary piece of the current rock renaissance ... In no minor way, 'Good Vibrations' is a primary influential piece for all producing rock artists; everyone has felt its import to some degree".

Discussing Smiley Smile, Daniel Harrison argues that the album could "almost" be considered art music in the Western classical tradition, and that the group's innovations in the language of rock can be compared to those that introduced atonal and other nontraditional techniques into that classical tradition. However, such notions were not widely acknowledged by rock audiences nor by the classically minded at the time. Harrison concludes: "What influences could these innovations then have? The short answer is, not much. Smiley Smile, Wild Honey, Friends, and 20/20 sound like few other rock albums; they are sui generis. ... It must be remembered that the commercial failure of the Beach Boys' experiments was hardly motivation for imitation." Musicologist David Toop placed the Beach Boys' innovations alongside Les Baxter, Aphex Twin, Herbie Hancock, King Tubby, and My Bloody Valentine.

Sunflower marked an end to the experimental songwriting and production phase initiated by Smiley Smile. After Surf's Up, Harrison wrote, their albums "contain a mixture of middle-of-the-road music entirely consonant with pop style during the early 1970s with a few oddities that proved that the desire to push beyond conventional boundaries was not dead", until 1974, "the year in which the Beach Boys ceased to be a rock 'n' roll act and became an oldies act".

=== Punk, alternative, and indie ===
For the artier branches of post-punk, Wilson's pained vulnerability, his uses of offbeat instruments and his intricate harmonies, not to mention the Smile saga itself, became a touchstone, from Pere Ubu and XTC to REM [sic] and the Pixies to U2 and My Bloody Valentine.

— Music critic Carl Wilson (no relation to Beach Boys member Carl Wilson)

In the 1970s, the Beach Boys served a "totemic influence" on punk rock that later gave way to indie rock. Brad Shoup of Stereogum surmised that, thanks to the Ramones' praise for the group, many punk, pop punk, or "punk-adjacent" artists showed influence from the Beach Boys, noting cover versions of the band's songs recorded by Slickee Boys, Agent Orange, Bad Religion, Shonen Knife, the Queers, Hi-Standard, the Descendents, the Donnas, M.O.D., and the Vandals. The Beach Boys Love You is sometimes considered the group's "punk album", (Note: In 2015, Wilson was asked about punk rock and responded: "I don't know what that is. Punk rock? Punk? What is that? ... Oh yeah. I never went for that. I never went for the fast kind of music. I go for the more medium tempo. Spencer Davis, I liked that.") and Pet Sounds is sometimes advanced as the first emo album.

In the 1990s, the Beach Boys experienced a resurgence of popularity with the alternative rock generation. According to Sean O'Hagan, leader of the High Llamas and former member of Stereolab, a younger generation of record-buyers "stopped listening to indie records" in favor of the Beach Boys. (Note: When asked how he felt about "reintroducing Brian Wilson as an alternative music hero and getting people back into Pet Sounds and SMiLE", O'Hagan mentioned that a "few of the touring American bands have told me that we did have such an impact, especially in LA".) Bands who advocated for the Beach Boys included founding members of the Elephant 6 Collective (Neutral Milk Hotel, the Olivia Tremor Control, the Apples in Stereo, and of Montreal). United by a shared love of the group's music, they named Pet Sounds Studio in honor of the band. Rolling Stone writer Barry Walters wrote in 2000 that albums such as Surf's Up and Love You "are becoming sonic blueprints, akin to what early Velvet Underground LPs meant to the previous indie peer group". The High Llamas, Eric Matthews and Saint Etienne are among the "alt heroes" who contributed cover versions of "unreleased, overlooked or underappreciated Wilson/Beach Boys obscurities" on the tribute album Caroline Now! (2000).

The Beach Boys remained among the most significant influences on indie rock into the late 2000s. Smile became a touchstone for many bands who were labelled "chamber pop", a term used for artists influenced by the lush orchestrations of Brian Wilson, Lee Hazlewood, and Burt Bacharach. Pitchfork writer Mark Richardson cited Smiley Smile as the origin point of "the kind of lo-fi bedroom pop that would later propel Sebadoh, Animal Collective, and other characters". The Sunflower track "All I Wanna Do" is also cited as one of the earliest precursors to chillwave, a microgenre that emerged in 2009.

== Landmarks ==
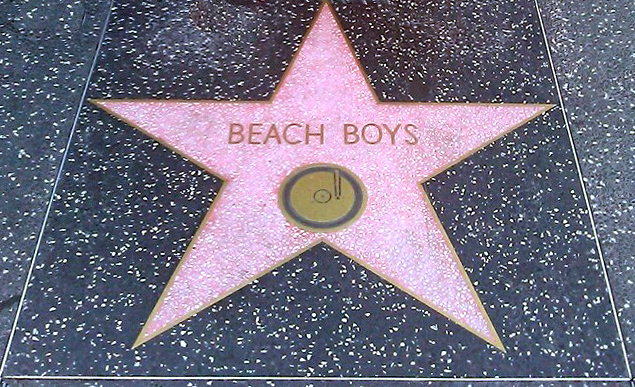
The Beach Boys' star on the Hollywood Walk of Fame, located at 1500 Vine Street

- The Wilsons' California house, where the Wilson brothers grew up and the group began, was demolished in 1986 to make way for Interstate 105, the Century Freeway. A Beach Boys Historic Landmark (California Landmark No. 1041 at 3701 West 119th Street), dedicated on May 20, 2005, marks the location.
- On December 30, 1980, the Beach Boys were awarded a star on the Hollywood Walk of Fame, located at 1500 Vine Street.
- On September 2, 1977, the Beach Boys performed before an audience of 40,000 at Narragansett Park in Pawtucket, Rhode Island, which remains the largest concert audience in Rhode Island history. On August 9, 2017, a commemoration ceremony produced by Al Gomes and Connie Watrous of Big Noise took place in Rhode Island with the Beach Boys, and the street where the concert stage formerly stood (at 510 Narragansett Park Drive) was officially renamed to "Beach Boys Way".
- On September 21, 2017, the Beach Boys were honored by Roger Williams University, along with Al Gomes and Connie Watrous of Big Noise, and plaques were unveiled to commemorate the band's concert on September 22, 1971, at the Baypoint Inn & Conference Center in Portsmouth, Rhode Island. The concert was the first-ever appearance of South African Ricky Fataar as an official member of the band and Filipino Billy Hinsche as a touring member, essentially changing the Beach Boys' live and recording act's line-up into a multi-cultural group. Diversity is a credo of Roger Williams University, which is why they chose to celebrate this moment in the band's history.

== Band members ==
=== Current ===
- Mike Love – vocals, saxophone, percussion, electro-Theremin (1961–present)

=== Former ===
- Brian Wilson – vocals, keyboards, bass (1961–1996, 2011–2012; died 2025; not touring during 1964–1976, 1982–1983, 1990–1996)
- Carl Wilson – vocals, lead and rhythm guitars, bass, keyboards, drums (1961–1998; his death; not touring during 1981–1982, 1997–1998)
- Dennis Wilson – vocals, drums, percussion, keyboards (1961–1983; his death; not touring during 1979–1980, 1983)
- Al Jardine – vocals, rhythm guitar, bass (1961–1962, 1963–1998, 2011–2012; guest 2014)
- David Marks – vocals, lead and rhythm guitars (1962–1963, 1997–1999, 2011–2012; guest 1971, 1995, 2008, 2014–2016)
- Bruce Johnston – vocals, keyboards, bass (1965–1972, 1978–2026)
- Ricky Fataar – vocals, drums, percussion, rhythm guitar, pedal steel guitar, keyboards (1972–1974; touring musician 1971–1972)
- Blondie Chaplin – vocals, lead and rhythm guitars, slide guitar, bass (1972–1973; guest 1995)

== Discography ==
Studio albums

- Surfin' Safari (1962)
- Surfin' U.S.A. (1963)
- Surfer Girl (1963)
- Little Deuce Coupe (1963)
- Shut Down Volume 2 (1964)
- All Summer Long (1964)
- The Beach Boys' Christmas Album (1964)
- The Beach Boys Today! (1965)
- Summer Days (And Summer Nights!!) (1965)
- Beach Boys' Party! (1965)
- Pet Sounds (1966)
- Smiley Smile (1967)
- Wild Honey (1967)
- Friends (1968)
- 20/20 (1969)
- Sunflower (1970)
- Surf's Up (1971)
- Carl and the Passions – "So Tough" (1972)
- Holland (1973)
- 15 Big Ones (1976)
- The Beach Boys Love You (1977)
- M.I.U. Album (1978)
- L.A. (Light Album) (1979)
- Keepin' the Summer Alive (1980)
- The Beach Boys (1985)
- Still Cruisin' (1989)
- Summer in Paradise (1992)
- Stars and Stripes Vol. 1 (1996)
- That's Why God Made the Radio (2012)

== Filmography ==
Fictionalized

- The Girls on the Beach (1965)
- The Monkey's Uncle (1965)
- 1986: You Again? (one episode: "The Audition")
- 1988: Full House (one episode: "Beach Boy Bingo")
- 1992: Full House (one episode: "Captain Video [Part 1]")
- 1997: Home Improvement (one episode: "The Karate Kid Returns")

Documentaries and filmed performances

- One Man's Challenge (1962)
- T.A.M.I. Show (1964)
- Good Vibrations from Central Park (1971)
- The Beach Boys: Good Vibrations Tour (1976)
- Going Platinum Presents The Beach Boys (1980)
- The Beach Boys: A Celebration Concert (1980)
- The Beach Boys: 20th Anniversary Special (1981)
- Beach Boys 4th of July Celebration: Live from Queen Mary (1981)
- The Beach Boys: An American Band (1985)
- The Beach Boys: 25 Years Together (1987)
- The Beach Boys Live in Japan '91 (1991)
- The Beach Boys Today (1993)
- The Beach Boys: Nashville Sounds (1996)
- Endless Harmony: The Beach Boys Story (1998)
- The Beach Boys: The Lost Concert (1998)
- Good Timin': Live at Knebworth England 1980 (2002)
- Sights + Sounds of Summer: The Very Best of The Beach Boys (2004)
- The Beach Boys: In London 1966 (2006)
- The Beach Boys 50: Doin' It Again (2012)
- The Beach Boys 50: Live in Concert (2012)
- The Beach Boys: Live at the Hollywood Bowl (2014)
- Classic Albums: Pet Sounds (2016)
- A Grammy Salute to The Beach Boys (2023)
- The Beach Boys (2024) (Documentary on Disney+)
