= The Beach Boys live performances =

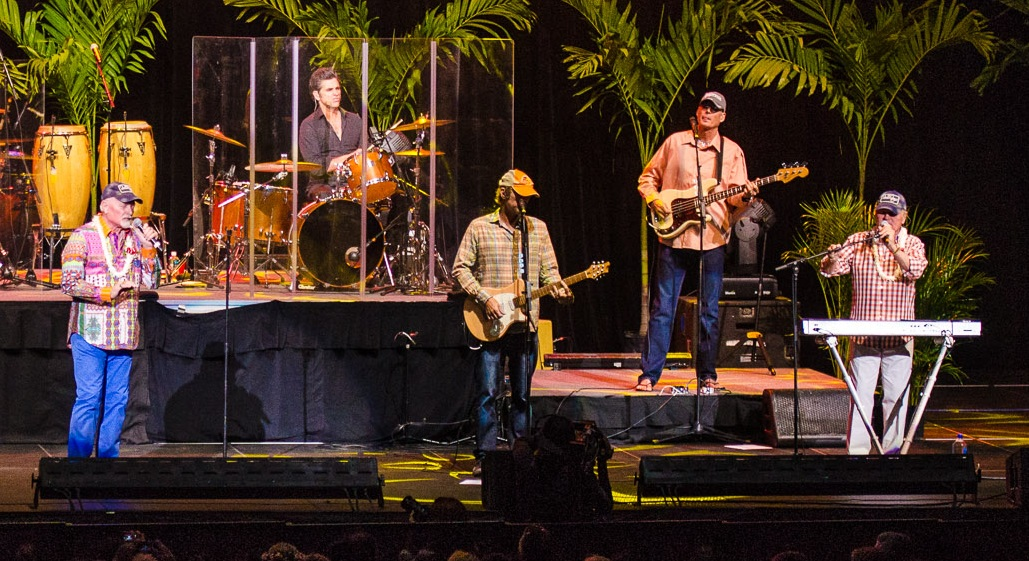
Mike Love (far left) and Bruce Johnston (far right) performing as the Beach Boys in 2014, with occasional guest performer John Stamos on drums (back)

The Beach Boys are an American rock band formed in Hawthorne, California, in 1961. Since then, the band has undergone many variations in composition, with representation by fill-ins onstage. As of 2026, the only principal member included in the Beach Boys' touring band is co-founder Mike Love.

In 1998, Love sought authorization through the Beach Boys' corporation, Brother Records Inc. (BRI) to tour as "The Beach Boys" and secured the necessary license, after which he continued touring with 1965 addition Bruce Johnston. Even though Brian Wilson and Al Jardine did not tour with Love and Johnston's band since their one-off 2012 reunion tour, they remained a part of BRI and toured separately from Love and Johnston. Brian died in 2025, with control of his share of BRI passing to his estate. Johnston quit the band in 2026 in order to focus on his solo career. Jardine remains active as a solo artist with the Pet Sounds Band.

== 1961–1964: Early years ==
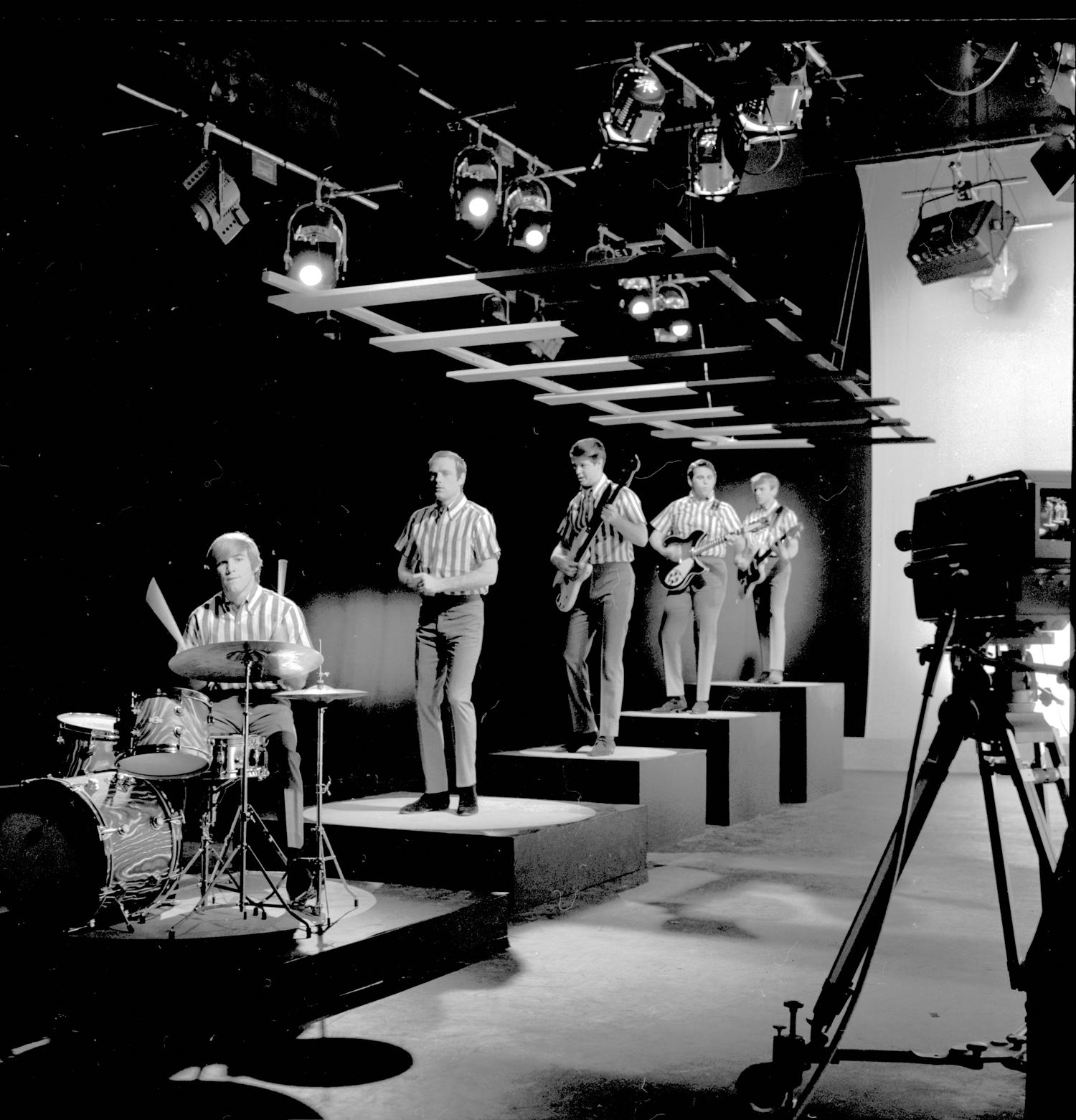
The Beach Boys' original lineup performing in 1964

The group's instrumental combo initially involved Brian Wilson on bass guitar and keyboards, Carl Wilson on guitar, and Dennis Wilson on drums. Nine months after forming a proper group with their cousin Mike Love and friend Al Jardine, the Beach Boys acquired national success, and demand for their personal appearance skyrocketed. Biographer James Murphy said, "By most contemporary accounts, they were not a very good live band when they started. ... The Beach Boys learned to play as a band in front of live audiences", but noted that they eventually became "one of the best and enduring live bands".

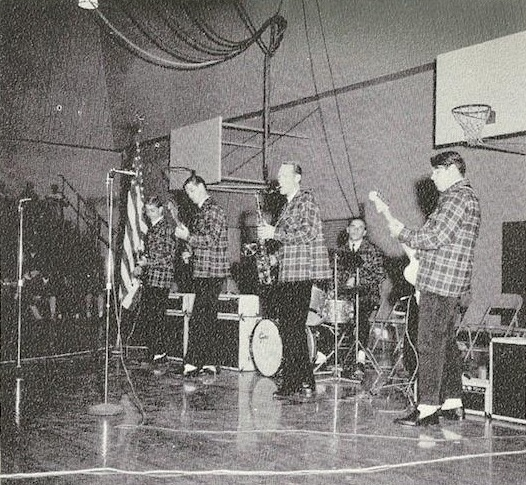
The Beach Boys, in Pendleton outfits, performing at a local high school, late 1962

By late 1961, the Wilsons' father Murry had become the de facto manager of the Beach Boys, and he landed the group's first paying gig (for which they earned $300) on New Year's Eve, 1961, at the Ritchie Valens Memorial Dance in Long Beach. In their early public appearances, the band wore heavy wool jacket-like shirts that local surfers favored before switching to their trademark striped shirts and white pants (a look that was taken directly from the Kingston Trio). All five members sang, with Brian playing bass, Dennis playing drums, Carl playing lead guitar and Al Jardine playing rhythm guitar, while Mike Love was the main singer and occasionally played saxophone. In February, Jardine left the Beach Boys and was replaced by David Marks on rhythm guitar. A common misconception is that Jardine left to focus on dental school. In reality, Jardine did not even apply to dental school until 1964, and the reason he left in February 1962 was due to creative differences and his belief that the newly-formed group would not be a commercial success.

The Beach Boys' first album, Surfin' Safari, was released in October 1962. It was different from other rock albums of the time in that it consisted almost entirely of original songs, primarily written by Brian with Mike Love and friend Gary Usher. Another unusual feature of the Beach Boys was that, although they were marketed as "surf music", their repertoire bore little resemblance to the music of other surf bands, which was mainly instrumental and incorporated heavy use of spring reverb. For this reason, some of the Beach Boys' early local performances had young audience members throwing vegetables at the band, believing that the group were poseurs.

In 1963, the band recorded three studio albums, Surfin' U.S.A., Surfer Girl, and Little Deuce Coupe, while still maintaining an intense touring schedule. Jardine returned in spring 1963 so Brian could make fewer touring appearances. Issues between Marks, his parents, and manager/the Wilsons' father Murry led Marks to quit in October 1963, shortly after re-recording "Be True to Your School" from the Little Deuce Coupe album for single release (backed with "In My Room" from Surfer Girl) and the standalone Christmas-themed single, "Little Saint Nick" (backed with an a cappella rendition of the scriptural song "The Lord's Prayer"), forcing Brian to appear full-time on the road again and Jardine to switch to rhythm guitar.

1964's Beach Boys Concert was their first live album featuring all 5 original members, their only number one album in the US, and the first live album that ever topped pop music record charts, maintaining its position for four weeks during a sixty-two-week chart stay, and becoming a gold seller.

== 1965–1998: Carl Wilson era ==
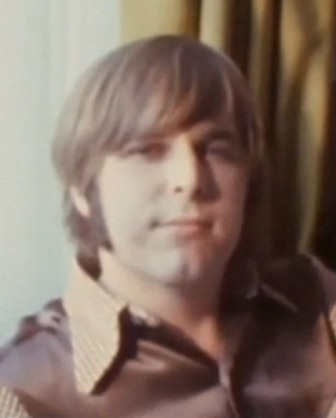
From 1965 to 1998, Carl Wilson was the live band's musical director.

=== 1965–1969 ===
By the end of 1964, the stress of road travel, composing, producing, and maintaining a high level of creativity became too much for Brian. On December 23, while on a flight from Los Angeles to Houston, he suffered a panic attack only hours after performing with the Beach Boys. In January 1965, he announced his withdrawal from touring to concentrate entirely on songwriting and record production. For the rest of 1964 and into 1965, session musician and up-and-coming solo artist Glen Campbell served as Wilson's temporary replacement in concert, until his own career success pulled him from the group in April 1965. Carl took over as the band's musical director onstage. (Note: Contracts at that time stipulated that promoters hire "Carl Wilson plus four other musicians". Additionally, in February, July, and October, Brian rejoined the live group for one-off occasions, such as television appearances and concerts in Chicago recorded for another live album (which remained unreleased until 2015).) In April 1965, the band asked musician and Columbia Records staff producer Bruce Johnston to locate a replacement for Campbell; having failed to find one, Johnston himself became a full-time member of the band on May 19, 1965, first replacing Brian on the road and later contributing in the studio, beginning with the vocal sessions for "California Girls" on June 4, 1965.

To appease Capitol's demands for a Beach Boys LP for the 1965 Christmas season, Brian conceived Beach Boys' Party!, a live-in-the-studio album consisting mostly of acoustic covers of 1950s rock and R&B songs, in addition to covers of three Beatles songs, Bob Dylan's "The Times They Are a-Changin'", and idiosyncratic re-recordings of the group's earlier songs. The album was an early precursor of the "unplugged" trend. It also included a cover of the Regents' song "Barbara Ann", which unexpectedly reached number 2 when released as a single several weeks later.

In October 1966, Brian flew out from Los Angeles to Michigan to assist the band in rehearsing their new single "Good Vibrations", which hadn't been played live before the three shows in Michigan. The album marks the second and third time the song was ever played live by the Beach Boys. As a result, the band taunts him out onto the stage for the second set's encore to play bass and provide vocals for Chuck Berry's "Johnny B. Goode"; two of these three concerts were recorded but not released until 2016. This was Brian's only guest appearance with the touring band in 1966.

On January 3, 1967, Carl Wilson refused to be drafted for military service, leading to indictment and criminal prosecution, which he challenged as a conscientious objector. The FBI arrested him in April, and it took several years for courts to resolve the matter.

From 1965 to 1967, the Beach Boys had developed a musical and lyrical sophistication that contrasted their work from before and after. This divide was further solidified by the difference in sound between their albums and their stage performances. In May 1967, the Beach Boys attempted to tour Europe with four extra musicians brought from the US, but were stopped by the British musicians' union. The tour went on without the extra support, and critics described their performances as "amateurish" and "floundering". At the last minute, the Beach Boys declined to headline the Monterey Pop Festival, an event held in June. According to David Leaf, "Monterey was a gathering place for the 'far out' sounds of the 'new' rock ... and it is thought that [their] non-appearance was what really turned the 'underground' tide against them." Fan magazines speculated that the group was on the verge of breaking up. Detractors called the band the "Bleach Boys" and "the California Hypes" as media focus shifted from Los Angeles to the happenings in San Francisco. As authenticity became a higher concern among critics, the group's legitimacy in rock music became an oft-repeated criticism, especially since their early songs appeared to celebrate a politically unconscious youth culture. (Note: Music critic Kenneth Partridge blamed the lack of "edginess" on the group's early records for why they are "rarely talked about in the same breath as the Beatles and the Rolling Stones, and when they are, it's really only because of two albums".)

In 1967, the Beach Boys were still under pressure and a contractual obligation to record and present an album to Capitol as a replacement for the cancelled album Smile." Sessions for the new album lasted from June to July 1967 at Brian's new makeshift home studio. Most of the album featured the Beach Boys playing their own instruments, rather than the session musicians employed in much of their previous work. It was the first album for which production was credited to the entire group instead of Brian alone. Shortly after completing the recording of the imminent Smiley Smile (1967), the band scheduled two performances in Hawaii for a prospective live album, Lei'd in Hawaii, that would be released on their new record label, Brother Records. Difficulties arose around this time. Johnston took a temporary break from the group and refused to travel for the reason that "it had all got too weird." To alleviate this, Brian was persuaded into making the trip. Ultimately, the band performed too poorly for the material to be released, and the recording allegedly suffered technical problems that could not be fixed in the studio; these performances (and an unfinished attempt to re-record the album in the studio) were ultimately released in 2017. The general record-buying public came to view the music made after this time as the point marking the band's artistic decline. Brian would not go on another tour with the group until 1976, as part of the "Brian's Back!" campaign.

The group was virtually blacklisted by the music press, to the extent that reviews of the group's records were either withheld from publication or published long after the release dates. The Beach Boys immediately recorded a new album, Wild Honey, an excursion into soul music, and a self-conscious attempt to "regroup" themselves as a rock band in opposition to their more orchestral affairs of the past. Its music differs in many ways from previous Beach Boys records: it contains very little group singing compared to previous albums, and mainly features Brian singing at his piano. Again, the Beach Boys recorded mostly at his home studio. Love reflected that Wild Honey was "completely out of the mainstream for what was going on at that time ... and that was the idea." Wild Honey was released on December 18, 1967; that month, Mike Love told a British journalist: "Brian has been rethinking our recording program and in any case we all have a much greater say nowadays in what we turn out in the studio."

In late 1967, the group successfully toured for the first time with outside musicians adding to the lineup of two guitars, bass, drums, and the occasional organ accompaniment: keyboardist Daryl Dragon and bassist Ron Brown. They eventually replaced Ron Brown with bassist/guitarist Ed Carter, also adding a percussionist. For a tour of Europe in late 1968, the band used a horn section. Live in London, a live album recorded in December 1968, was released in several countries in 1970 to fulfill the band's contract with Capitol Records, although it would not see US release until 1976. After the contract was completed, Capitol deleted the Beach Boys' catalog from print, effectively cutting off their royalty flow. On June 17, 1969, the Beach Boys became the first Western rock group to play in Czechoslovakia, then a Communist Bloc country, following the Soviet invasion of 1968. Carl remembered: "The audience was incredible. It was a real joy for them to be able to see someone from the West. It was a kind of symbol of freedom for them." In August 1969, Carl, Dennis, Love, and Jardine sought a permanent replacement for Johnston, with Johnston unaware of this search. They approached Carl's brother-in-law Billy Hinsche, who declined the offer to focus on his college studies.

The touring band expanded during the late 1960s and early 1970s, with multiple percussionists, including Mike Kowalski, and keyboardists, including Hinsche (who eventually agreed to join as a touring member) and Carli Muñoz, rotated through the touring band at this time.

=== 1970–1975 ===
The group was signed to Reprise Records in 1970. Scott Schinder described the label as "probably the hippest and most artist-friendly major label of the time." The deal was brokered by Van Dyke Parks, who was then employed as a multimedia executive at Warner Music Group. Reprise's contract stipulated Brian's proactive involvement with the band in all albums. By the time the Beach Boys' tenure ended with Capitol in 1969, they had sold 65 million records worldwide, closing the decade as the most commercially successful American group in popular music.

After recording over 30 different songs and going through several album titles, their first LP for Reprise, Sunflower, was released on August 31, 1970. Sunflower featured a strong group presence with significant writing contributions from all six band members. Brian was active during this period, writing or co-writing seven of Sunflower's 12 songs and performing at half of the band's domestic concerts in 1970. The album received critical acclaim in both the US and the UK. This was offset by the album reaching only number 151 on US record charts during a four-week stay, becoming one of the worst-selling of the Beach Boys' albums at that point. Fans generally regard the LP as the Beach Boys' finest post-Pet Sounds album.

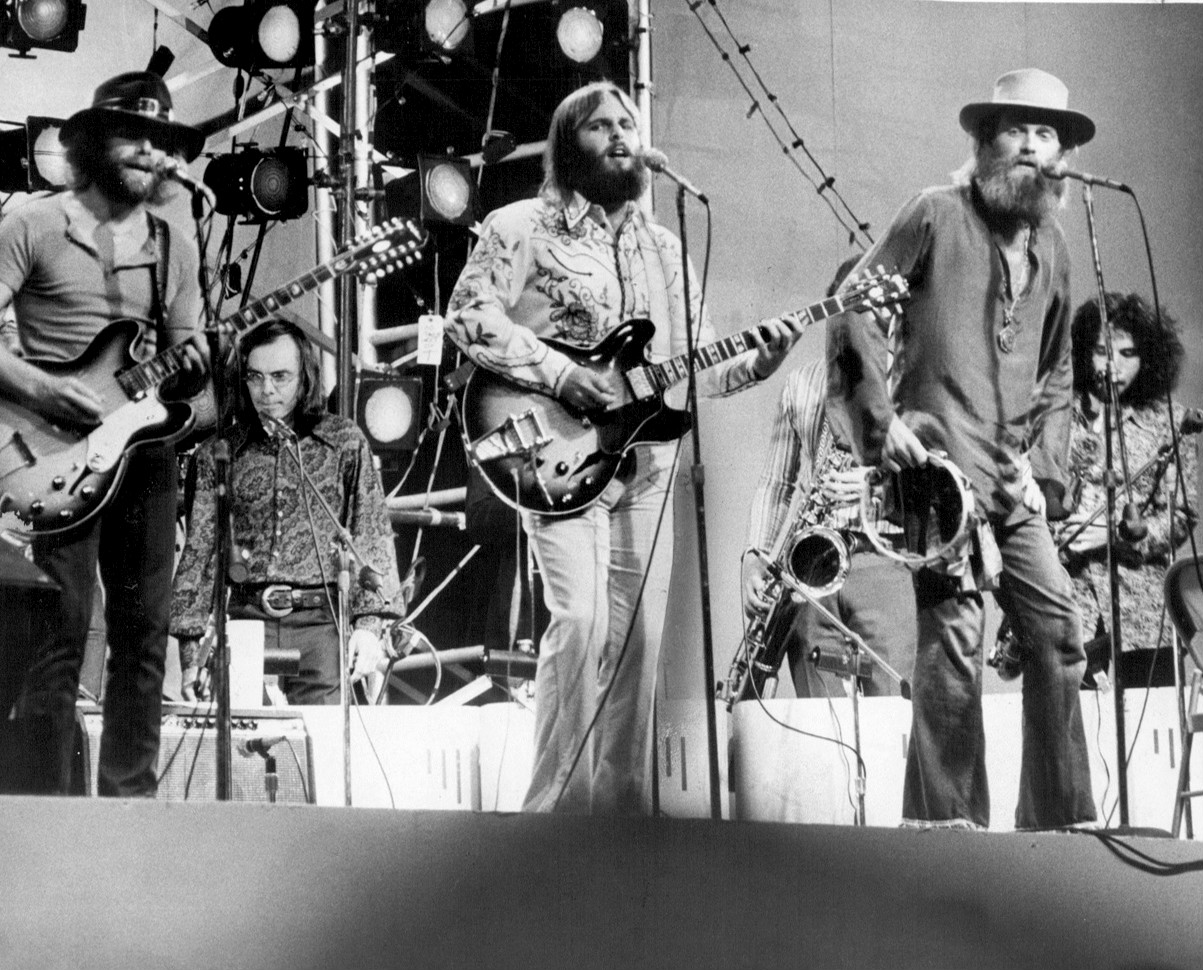
The Beach Boys performing in Central Park, July 1971

In mid-1970, the Beach Boys hired radio presenter Jack Rieley as their manager. One of his initiatives was to encourage the band to record songs featuring more socially conscious lyrics. He also requested the completion of Smile track "Surf's Up" and arranged a guest appearance at a Grateful Dead concert at Bill Graham's Fillmore East in April 1971 to foreground the Beach Boys' transition into the counterculture. In early 1971, after reuniting onstage in Boston with the Beach Boys, despite a chilly reception from both the public and Bruce Johnston, Marks received an offer from Mike Love to rejoin the band but he declined. During this time, the group ceased wearing matching uniforms on stage, Later in 1971, Dennis injured his hand, leaving him temporarily unable to play the drums. He continued in the band, singing and occasionally playing keyboards, while Ricky Fataar, formerly of the Flames, took over on drums. In July, the American music press rated the Beach Boys "the hottest grossing act" in the country, alongside Grand Funk Railroad. The band filmed a concert for ABC-TV in Central Park, which aired as Good Vibrations from Central Park on August 19.

On August 30, the band released Surf's Up, which was moderately successful, reaching the US top-thirty, a marked improvement over their recent releases. While the record charted, the Beach Boys added to their renewed fame by performing a near-sellout set at Carnegie Hall; their live shows during this era included reworked arrangements of many of their previous songs, with their set lists culling from Pet Sounds and Smile. On October 28, the Beach Boys were the featured cover story on that date's issue of Rolling Stone. It included the first part of a lengthy two-part interview, titled "The Beach Boys: A California Saga", conducted by Tom Nolan and David Felton.

In early 1972, the group added two official members for the first time since Johnston's arrival in 1965: Fataar was promoted from touring member to official band member, and his ex-Flames bandmate, singer/guitarist/bassist Blondie Chaplin also joined the band as an official member. In mid-1972, Bruce Johnston left the Beach Boys. The new line-up released the comparatively unsuccessful Carl and the Passions – "So Tough" in May 1972, followed by Holland in January 1973. Reprise felt Holland needed a strong single. Following the intervention of Van Dyke Parks, this resulted in the inclusion of "Sail On, Sailor". Reprise approved, and the resulting album peaked at number 37. From March 7 to May 17, the Beach Boys embarked on a ten-week U.S. tour with a supporting band that included guitarist Billy Hinsche, keyboardist Carlos Munoz, drummer Joe Pollard, bassist Ed Carter, and percussionist Richard "Didymus" Washington. Chaplin departed in December 1973, with his role as bassist on the road taken by James Guercio, who was also the manager for the band Chicago. In 1974, they added a new percussionist, Bobby Figueroa, who replaced Mike Kowalski.

After Holland, the group maintained a touring regimen, captured on the double live album The Beach Boys in Concert released in November 1973, but recorded very little in the studio through 1975. Several months earlier, they had announced that they would complete Smile, but this never came to fruition, and plans for its release were once again abandoned. (Note: Pursuant to the terms of their record contract, when the group missed their May 1973 deadline to deliver the Smile album, Warner Bros. deducted $50,000 from the band's next advance.) In October, the band fired Rieley. Rieley's position was succeeded by Mike Love's brother, Stephen, and Chicago manager James William Guercio. Fataar left the band in November 1974, with Dennis returning to drums following Fataar's departure.

The Beach Boys' greatest hits compilation album Endless Summer was released in June 1974 to unexpected success, becoming the band's second number 1 US album in October. The LP had a 155-week chart run, selling over 3 million copies. The Beach Boys became the number-one act in the US, propelling themselves from opening for Crosby, Stills, Nash and Young in the summer of 1974 to headliners selling out basketball arenas in a matter of weeks. Guercio prevailed upon the group to swap out newer songs with older material in their concert setlists, partly to accommodate their growing audience and the demand for their early hits. Later in the year, members of the band (Carl, Dennis, and Al Jardine) appeared as guests on Chicago's hit "Wishing You Were Here". At the end of 1974, Rolling Stone proclaimed the Beach Boys "Band of the Year" based on the strength of their live performances.

To capitalize on their sudden resurgence in popularity, the Beach Boys accepted Guercio's invitation to record their next Reprise album at his Caribou Ranch studio, located around the mountains of Nederland, Colorado. These October 1974 sessions marked the group's return to the studio after a 21-month period of virtual inactivity, but the proceedings were cut short after Brian had insisted on returning to his home in Los Angeles. With the project put on hold, the Beach Boys spent most of the next year on the road playing college football stadiums and basketball arenas. The only Beach Boys recording of 1974 to see release at the time was the Christmas single "Child of Winter", recorded upon the group's return to Los Angeles in November and released the following month.

Over the summer of 1975, the touring group played a co-headlining series of concert dates with Chicago, a pairing that was nicknamed "Beachago". The tour was massively successful and restored the Beach Boys' profitability to what it had been in the mid-1960s. Although another joint tour with Chicago had been planned for the summer of 1976, the Beach Boys' association with Guercio and his Caribou Management company ended in early 1976. (Note: According to Gaines, Guercio may have been fired because members of the group "felt Caribou was being overpaid", although "many observers suggest the Beach Boys followed an old pattern of jettisoning personnel when their financial situation improved." Biographer Mark Dillon states that the tour evaporated due to Dennis' budding romance with Karen Lamm, the ex-wife of Chicago keyboardist Robert Lamm.) Stephen Love subsequently took over as the band's de facto business manager.

=== 1976–1979 ===
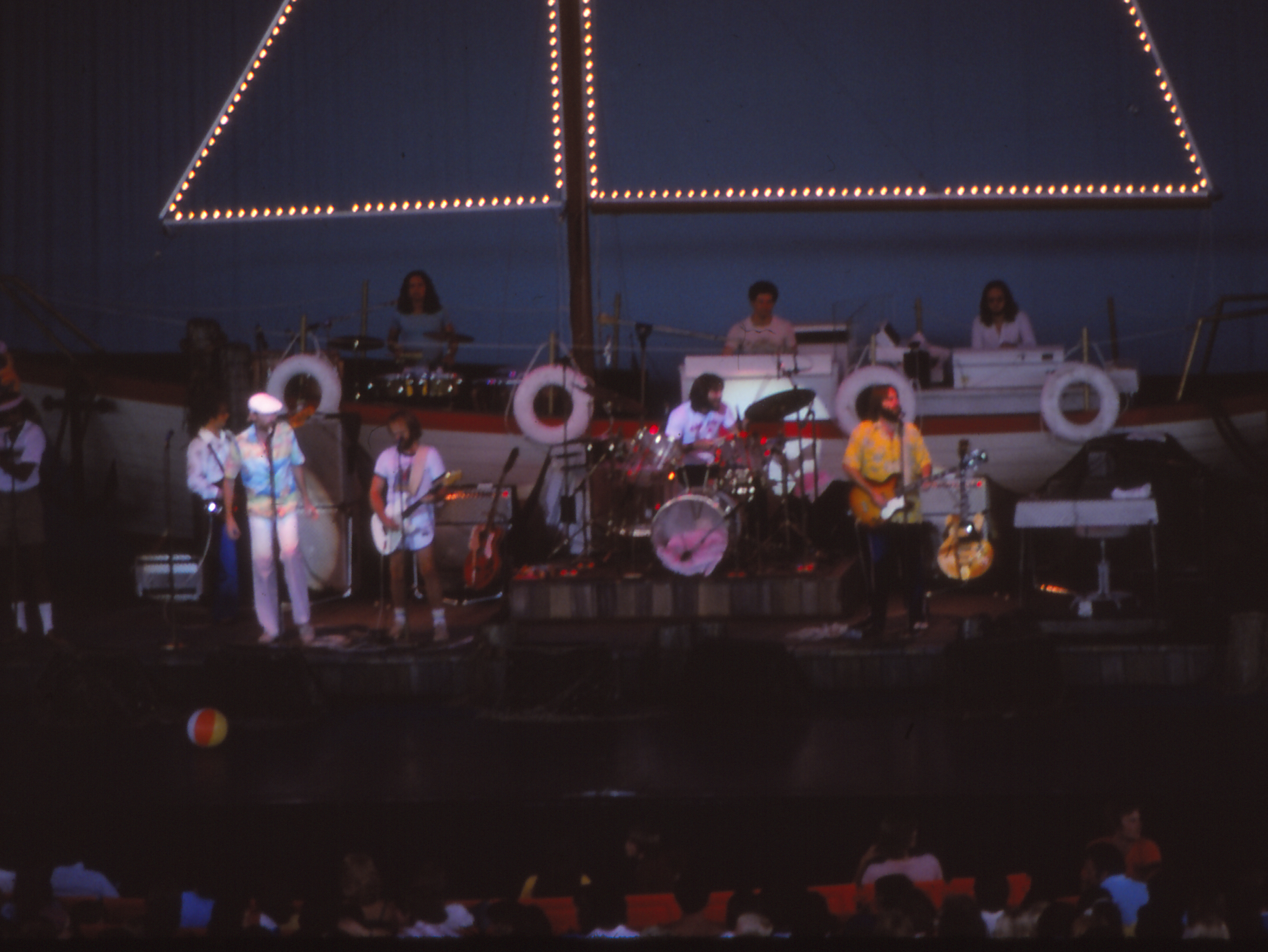
Performing in Michigan, 1978

In October 1975, Marilyn persuaded Brian to admit himself to the care of psychologist Eugene Landy, who kept him from indulging in substance abuse with constant supervision. Brian was kept in the program until December 1976. At the end of January 1976, the Beach Boys returned to the studio with Brian producing once again. Brian decided the band should do an album of rock and roll and doo wop standards. Carl and Dennis disagreed, feeling that an album of originals was far more ideal, while Love and Jardine wanted the album out as quickly as possible. To highlight Brian's recovery and his return to writing and producing, Stephen devised a promotional campaign with the tagline "Brian Is Back!", and paid the Rogers & Cowan publicity agency $3,500 per month to implement it. The band also commissioned an NBC-TV special, later known as The Beach Boys: It's OK!, that was produced by Saturday Night Live creator Lorne Michaels.

Released on July 5, 1976, 15 Big Ones was generally disliked by fans and critics, as well as Carl and Dennis, who disparaged the album to the press. The album peaked at number 8 in the US, becoming their first top-ten album of new material since Pet Sounds, and their highest-charting studio album since Summer Days (And Summer Nights!!). Lead single "Rock and Roll Music" peaked at number 5 – their highest chart ranking since "Good Vibrations". Also in early July, Brian returned to the touring group as a keyboardist and bassist to promote the Brian's Back 'campaign'. This also allowed him to promote the treatment that he was under for part of his first term of service under Eugene Landy. For the first time in nearly 6 years, the Beach Boys performed their first show with all five original members at Anaheim Stadium on July 3, 1976. Between 1976 and 1978, the band used a horn section originally known as the Hornettes, which later changed its name to Tornado.

From late 1976 to early 1977, Brian made sporadic public appearances and produced the band's next album, The Beach Boys Love You. He regarded it as a spiritual successor to Pet Sounds, namely because of the autobiographical lyrics. Released on April 11, 1977, Love You peaked at number 53 in the US and number 28 in the UK. Adult/Child, the intended follow-up to Love You, was completed, but the release was vetoed by Love and Jardine. At the beginning of 1977, the Beach Boys had enjoyed their most lucrative concert tours ever, with the band playing in packed stadiums and earning up to $150,000 per show. Concurrently, the band was the subject of a record company bidding war, as their contract with Warner Bros. had been set to expire soon. Stephen Love arranged for the Beach Boys to sign an $8 million deal with CBS Records on March 1. Numerous stipulations were given in the CBS contract, including that the deal required the group to play thirty concerts a year in the U.S., in addition to one tour in Australia and Japan, and two tours in Europe.

Within weeks of the CBS contract, Stephen was effectively fired by the band, with one of the alleged reasons being that Mike had not permitted Stephen to sign on his behalf while at a TM retreat in Switzerland. For Stephen's replacement, the group hired Carl's friend Henry Lazarus, an entertainment business owner that had no prior experience in the music industry. Lazarus arranged a major European tour for the Beach Boys, starting in late July, with stops in Germany, Switzerland, and France. Due to poor planning, the tour was cancelled shortly before it began, as Lazarus had failed to complete the necessary paperwork. The group subsequently fired Lazarus and were sued by many of the concert promoters, with losses of $200,000 in preliminary expenses and $550,000 in potential revenue.

In July, the Beach Boys played a concert at Wembley Stadium that was notable for the fact that, during the show, Mike attacked Brian with a piano bench onstage in front of over 15,000 attendees. (Note: Love later explained that he had been "in a state of extreme sensitivity" after learning that his girlfriend was in a vegetative state following "a horrific car accident".) In August, Mike and Jardine persuaded Stephen to return as the group's manager, a decision that Carl and Dennis had strongly opposed. By this point, the band had effectively split into two camps; Dennis and Carl on one side, Mike and Jardine on the other, with Brian remaining neutral. These two opposing contingents within the group – known among their associates as the "free-livers" and the "meditators" – were traveling in different planes, using different hotels, and rarely speaking to each other. According to Love, "[T]he terms 'smokers' and 'nonsmokers' were also used."

On September 3, after completing the final date of a northeastern US tour, the internal wrangling came to a head. Following a confrontation on an airport apron – a spectacle that a bystanding Rolling Stone journalist compared to the ending of Casablanca – Dennis declared that he had left the band. The group was broken up until a meeting at Brian's house on September 17. In light of the lucrative CBS contract, the parties negotiated a settlement resulting in Love gaining control of Brian's vote in the group, allowing Love and Jardine to outvote Carl and Dennis on any matter.

For much of 1978, Brian served mostly as the band's bassist on the road, with then-bassist Ed Carter shifting to guitar. Following this period, Brian's concert appearances with the band gradually diminished, and their performances were occasionally erratic. The group had still owed one more album for Reprise. Released in September 1978, M.I.U. Album was recorded at Maharishi International University in Iowa at the suggestion of Love. Dennis and Carl made limited contributions to M.I.U. Album; the album was produced by Jardine and Ron Altbach, with Brian credited as "executive producer". Dennis started to withdraw from the group to focus on his second solo album, Bambu, which was shelved just as alcoholism and marital problems overcame all three Wilson brothers. Carl appeared intoxicated during concerts (especially at appearances for their 1978 Australia tour) and Brian gradually slid back into addiction and an unhealthy lifestyle. (Note: At a concert in Perth, Carl was so inebriated that he fell over mid-performance. The next day, he apologized for his poor performance on national television.) Stephen was fired shortly after the Australia tour partly due to an incident in which Brian's bodyguard Rocky Pamplin physically assaulted Carl.

=== 1980s–1990s ===
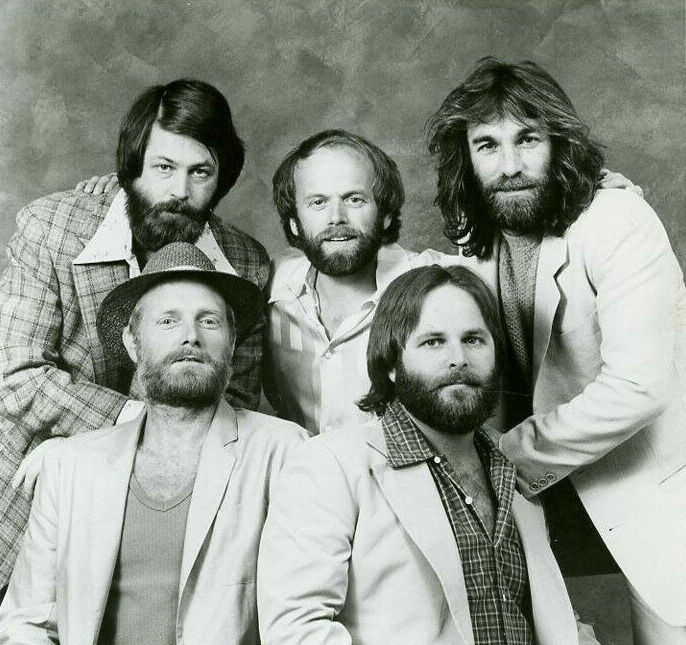
The Beach Boys in 1979

The group's first two albums for CBS, 1979's L.A. (Light Album) and 1980's Keepin' the Summer Alive, struggled in the US, charting at 100 and 75 respectively, though the band did manage a top-forty single from L.A. with "Good Timin'". The recording of these albums saw Bruce Johnston return to the band, initially solely as a producer and eventually as a full-time band member. In May 1979, Dennis was suspended from the touring band. He was absent from many concerts, with percussionist Bobby Figueroa moving to drums in his absence, but he returned in June 1980 for a European tour. On June 21, 1980, the Beach Boys performed a concert at Knebworth, England, which featured a slightly intoxicated Dennis. The concert would later be released as a live album titled Good Timin': Live at Knebworth England 1980 in 2002; this was the first live album featuring all six band members to be released. During this period, the band members themselves provided the majority of the instrumentation in their concerts, augmented by supporting musicians Ed Carter (backing vocals, rhythm and lead guitars), Joe Chemay (bass, backing vocals), Figueroa (vocals, percussion, drums), and Mike Meros (organ, keyboards, synthesizer, piano). Shortly after this tour, Chemay departed, with Carter moving back to bass. On July 4, 1980, they played at the Washington Mall, notably featuring all six band members playing together. (Bobby Figueroa left in 1981 and returned in July 1983.)

In an April 1980 interview, Carl reflected that "the last two years have been the most important and difficult time of our career. We were at the ultimate crossroads. We had to decide whether what we had been involved in since we were teenagers had lost its meaning. We asked ourselves and each other the difficult questions we'd often avoided in the past." In 1981, Carl quit the live group because of unhappiness with the band's nostalgic format and lackluster live performances, subsequently pursuing a solo career. He stated: "I haven't quit the Beach Boys but I do not plan on touring with them until they decide that 1981 means as much to them as 1961." Carl returned in May 1982, after approximately 14 months of being away, on the condition that the group reconsider their rehearsal and touring policies and refrain from "Las Vegas-type" engagements. During 1981 and early 1982, Carl's place on lead guitar on the road was taken by longtime touring bassist/guitarist Ed Carter. Simultaneously, Adrian Baker joined as a touring vocalist and rhythm guitarist, to handle many of Brian's former vocals, especially his famous falsetto vocals. Carter's role as a bassist was taken by Ernie Knapp. Carter left the touring band in late 1981 after suffering a hernia, with his place on lead guitar being taken by Jeff Foskett. When Carl returned in May 1982, he overhauled the touring band, firing Knapp and rehiring Hinsche and Carter, among other personnel moves. Baker departed later that year, with Foskett taking his falsetto vocals.

In late 1982, Eugene Landy was once more employed as Brian's therapist, and a more radical program was undertaken to try to restore Brian to health. This involved removing him from the group on November 5, 1982, at the behest of Carl, Love, and Jardine, in addition to putting him on a rigorous diet and health regimen. Coupled with long, extreme counseling sessions, this therapy was successful in bringing Brian back to physical health, slimming down from 311 pounds (141 kg) to 185 pounds (84 kg). Brian returned in May 1983 making semi-regular appearances through mid-1990. For the rest of 1983, By 1983, supporting musicians included Ed Carter (bass, backing vocals), Billy Hinsche on (vocals, keyboards, rhythm guitar), Mike Kowalski (drums), Jeff Foskett (vocals, rhythm and lead guitars), and Bobby Figueroa (percussion). The band featured a percussion lineup including Dennis and Kowalski each on a drum kit and Figueroa on auxiliary percussion.

By the late 1970s and early 1980s, Dennis had been embroiled in successive failed romantic relationships, including a tense and short-lived relationship with Fleetwood Mac's Christine McVie, and found himself in severe economic trouble resulting in the sale of Brother Studios, established by the Wilson brothers in 1974 and where Pacific Ocean Blue was produced, and the forfeiture of his beloved yacht. To cope with the combination of devastating losses, Dennis heavily abused alcohol, cocaine, and heroin and was, by 1983, homeless and lived a nomadic lifestyle. He was often seen spending much of his time wandering the Los Angeles coast and often missed Beach Boys performances. By this point, he had lost his voice and much of his ability to play drums. In 1983, tensions between Dennis and Love escalated to the point that each obtained a restraining order against the other. Following Brian's readmission for Landy's treatment, Dennis was given an ultimatum after his last performance in November 1983 to check into rehab for his alcohol problems or be banned from performing live with the band again. Dennis checked into rehab for his chance to get sober, but on December 28, he drowned at the age of 39 in Marina del Rey while diving from a friend's boat trying to recover items that he had previously thrown overboard in a fit of rage. His role as road drummer was shared between touring members Kowalski and Figueroa.

The Beach Boys spent the next several years touring, often playing in front of large audiences, and recording songs for film soundtracks and various artists compilations. One new studio album, the self-titled The Beach Boys, appeared in 1985 and proved a modest success, becoming their highest-charting album in the US since 15 Big Ones. The band introduced electronic drums to their touring group at this time, with Kowalski and Figueroa rotating between a regular (acoustic) drum kit and electronic drum kit during shows.

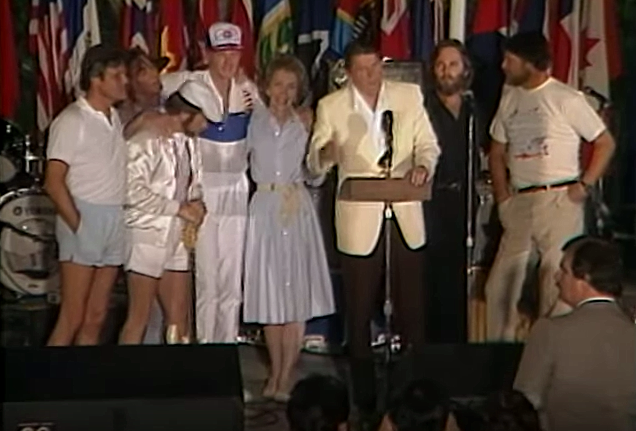
The Beach Boys with President Ronald Reagan and First Lady Nancy Reagan at the White House, June 12, 1983

Since 1980, the Beach Boys and the Grass Roots had performed Independence Day concerts at the National Mall in Washington, D.C., attracting large crowds. However, in April 1983, James G. Watt, President Ronald Reagan's Secretary of the Interior, banned Independence Day concerts on the Mall by such groups. Watt said that "rock bands" that had performed on the Mall on Independence Day in 1981 and 1982 had encouraged drug use and alcoholism and had attracted "the wrong element", who would steal from attendees. During the ensuing uproar, which included over 40,000 complaints to the Department of the Interior, the Beach Boys stated that the Soviet Union, which had invited them to perform in Leningrad in 1978, "...obviously ... did not feel that the group attracted the wrong element." Vice President George H. W. Bush said of the Beach Boys, "They're my friends and I like their music". Watt later apologized to the band after learning that President Reagan and First Lady Nancy Reagan were fans. White House staff presented Watt with a plaster foot with a hole in it, showing that he had "shot himself in the foot".

They returned to Washington, D.C. for Independence Day in 1984 and performed to a crowd of 750,000 people. On July 4, 1985, the group played to an afternoon crowd of over one million in Philadelphia, and the same evening they performed for over 750,000 people on the Mall in Washington. They also appeared nine days later at the Live Aid concert and performed at the "opening campfire" of the 1985 National Scout Jamboree for a crowd of over 32,000 members and guests of the Boy Scouts of America.

The band's performances on July 4, 1985, marked the first time that actor John Stamos would sit in with The Beach Boys. Stamos would also collaborate with the band on You Again? and Full House and promote the band's later releases on the show. Stamos' occasional guest appearances have continued since 1985. Jardine's son Matt joined the touring band in 1988 as a percussionist, with Figueroa leaving by that summer.

Commenting on his relationship to the band in 1988, Brian said that he avoided his family at Landy's suggestion, adding that "Although we stay together as a group, as people we're a far cry from friends." Mike denied the accusation that he and the band were keeping Brian from participating with the group.

In 1990, Foskett was let go from the band, with Baker returning. By 1992, Matt Jardine replaced Baker as the falsetto vocalist. By 1996, Carter and Hinsche were replaced by bassist Chris Farmer and keyboardist Tim Bonhomme.

In 1992, critic Jim Miller wrote, "They have become a figment of their own past, prisoners of their unflagging popularity—incongruous emblems of a sunny myth of eternal youth belied by much of their own best music. … The group is still largely identified with its hits from the early Sixties." That year, Love filed a defamation lawsuit against Brian due to how he was presented in Brian's 1992 memoir Wouldn't It Be Nice: My Own Story. Its publisher HarperCollins settled the suit for $1.5 million. Other defamation lawsuits were filed by Carl, Brother Records, and the Wilsons' mother Audree. With Love and Brian unable to determine exactly what Love was properly owed in royalties, Love sued Brian in 1992, winning $13 million in 1994 for lost royalties. 35 of the group's songs were then amended to credit Love. He later called it "almost certainly the largest case of fraud in music history". The day after California courts issued a restraining order between Brian and Landy, Brian phoned Sire Records staff producer Andy Paley to collaborate on new material tentatively for the Beach Boys. After losing the songwriting credits lawsuit with Love, Brian told MOJO in February 1995: "Mike and I are just cool. There's a lot of shit Andy and I got written for him. I just had to get through that goddamn trial!" In April, it was unclear whether the project would turn into a Wilson solo album, a Beach Boys album, or a combination of the two. The project ultimately disintegrated. Instead, Brian and his bandmates recorded Stars and Stripes Vol. 1, an album of country music stars covering Beach Boys songs, with co-production helmed by River North Records owner Joe Thomas. Afterward, the group discussed finishing the album Smile, but Carl rejected the idea, fearing that it would cause Brian another nervous breakdown.

Early in 1997, Carl was diagnosed with lung and brain cancer after years of heavy smoking. Despite his terminal condition, Carl continued to perform with the band on its 1997 summer tour (a double-bill with the band Chicago) while undergoing chemotherapy. During performances, he sat on a stool and needed oxygen after every song; he performed for several months while his condition started to deteriorate. At this time, Phil Bardowell joined as a rhythm guitarist. Later in 1997, Carl left the touring band because of his health. Bardowell briefly moved to lead guitar before former guitarist David Marks rejoined the band and took Carl's spot on the road; Marks and Bardowell split lead guitar duties, while Farmer took Carl's role as musical director.

Love, Johnston, Marks, Glen Campbell, Dean Torrence of Jan and Dean, and John Stamos (who had been a semi-regular guest in the touring band since the 1980s and continues to do so) performed at a pre-show for the 1998 Super Bowl, as "A Tribute to The Beach Boys" featuring the aforementioned members.

Carl died on February 6, 1998, at the age of 51, two months after the death of the Wilsons' mother, Audree.

== 1998–present: Post-band split ==
=== 1998–2009 ===
After Carl died in 1998, the remaining members splintered. Following one final performance on May 9 as a benefit concert for the American Cancer Society in Detroit, Jardine quit the band, while Love, Johnston and Marks continued to tour together, initially as "The California Beach Band" (not as "America's Band", contrary to previous reports). Following several cancelled bookings under that name, Love sought authorization through Brother Records Inc. (BRI) to tour as "The Beach Boys" and secured the necessary license. Love, Johnston and Marks continued touring as the Beach Boys from July 4, 1998. At the time, Brian Wilson was also offered the license, but declined and began touring as a solo artist.

After Carl's death, Jardine began to perform regularly with his band "Beach Boys: Family & Friends" until he ran into legal issues for using the name without license. During this time, Jardine's group included his sons Matt and Adam, Brian Wilson's daughters Carnie and Wendy Wilson, Cass Elliot's daughter Owen, former touring bassist Ed Carter, former touring percussionist/drummer Bobby Figueroa. Jardine's group briefly included Daryl Dragon, who had formerly toured and recorded with The Beach Boys. Meanwhile, Jardine sued Love, claiming that he had been excluded from their concerts, BRI, through its longtime attorney, Ed McPherson, sued Jardine in Federal Court. Jardine, in turn, counter-claimed against BRI for wrongful termination. Courts ruled in Love's favor, denying Jardine the use of the Beach Boys name in any fashion. However, Jardine proceeded to appeal this decision in addition to seeking $4 million in damages. The California Court of Appeal proceeded to rule that, "Love acted wrongfully in freezing Jardine out of touring under the Beach Boys name", allowing Jardine to continue with his lawsuit. The case ended up being settled outside of court with the terms not disclosed. Jardine formed a later group, also featuring former Beach Boys touring members, called the Endless Summer Band.

During the legal struggle, Matt Jardine left Love and Johnston's Beach Boys touring band and was replaced by a returning Adrian Baker. Marks quit the band again in 1999, due to health issues when he was diagnosed with hepatitis C with Bardowell moving back to lead guitar in Marks' absence. In July 2001, longtime keyboardist Mike Meros was fired and replaced by John Cowsill, drummer for the 1960s family band The Cowsills. At the same time, Bardowell left the touring band and was replaced by Scott Totten.

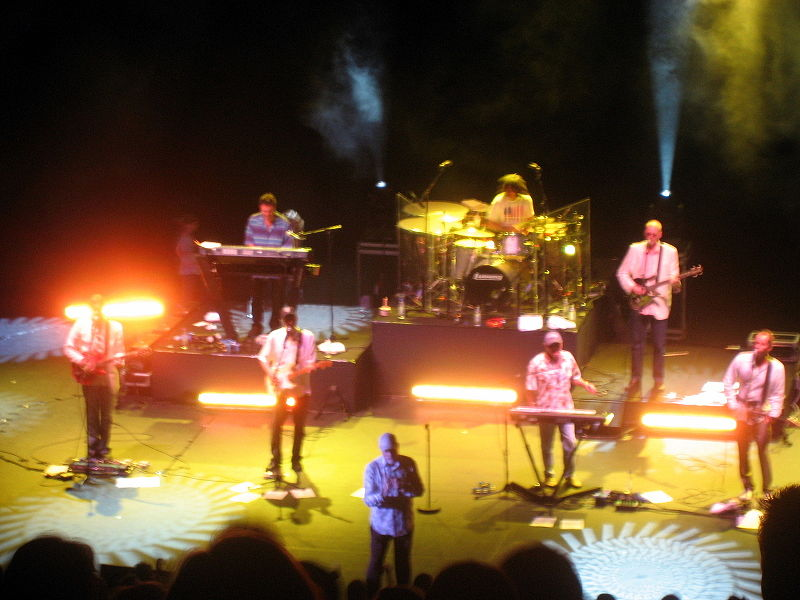
The touring lineup of Mike Love and Bruce Johnston's "The Beach Boys Band", with David Marks, in 2008

In 2004, Baker was replaced by former Papa Doo Run Run member Randell Kirsch. Love's son Christian joined as a second rhythm guitarist in 2006. Longtime drummer Mike Kowalski left in 2007, with Cowsill moving to drums in his absence. Chris Farmer also left in 2007 (currently performs with Timothy B. Schmit and pursues solo projects), with Kirsch moving to bass and Totten taking Farmer's role as musical director.

In 2006, Brian Wilson, Love, Jardine, Marks, and Johnston participated in a non-performing reunion on the rooftop of the Capitol Records building in Los Angeles to celebrate that the compilation album Sounds of Summer: The Very Best of The Beach Boys had been certified double-platinum. Later that year, Jardine joined Brian Wilson and his band for a short tour celebrating the 40th anniversary of Pet Sounds.

In 2008, Marks toured with Love and Johnston's touring band briefly for a tour of Europe. Otherwise, the lineup remained until 2012.

=== 2010s–2020s ===
==== 50th Anniversary Reunion Tour (2011–2012) ====
Jardine made his first appearance with the Beach Boys touring band in more than 10 years in 2011 at a tribute concert for Ronald Reagan's 100th birthday; at this concert, he sang lead on "Help Me, Rhonda" and "Sloop John B". He made a handful of other appearances with Love and Johnston's touring band as a test and preparation for a possible future reunion.

On December 16, 2011, it was announced that Wilson, Love, Jardine, Johnston, and David Marks would reunite for a new album and 50th anniversary tour. On February 12, 2012, the Beach Boys performed at the 2012 Grammy Awards, in what was billed as a "special performance" by organizers. It marked the group's first live performance to include Wilson since 1996 and first tour to include Jardine since 1998 and Marks since 1999 (other than Marks' guest appearances with the touring band in Europe in mid-2008). The touring band included two members of the Love/Johnston touring band, guitarist/vocalist Scott Totten and drummer/vocalist John Cowsill, plus most of Wilson's band, including former Beach Boys touring vocalist/guitarist Jeff Foskett, alongside former Wondermints Darian Sahanaja, Probyn Gregory, Nick Walusko ("Nicky Wonder"), and Mike d'Amico. The touring band also included Paul von Mertens, who was the first woodwind player in the band since 1998.

During the tour, in May 2012, when asked about the future held for the band and its reunion after the scheduled end of the tour in September, Love stated that "We're looking at our present and future. I think we're going to be doing this again with Brian for a long time." Wilson said that he had begun planning for another Beach Boys album for the band would record after the tour. Love claims to have received an email from Melinda Ledbetter, Brian Wilson's wife and longtime manager, on June 1, 2012, stating "no more shows for Wilson". Love then began accepting invitations for when the reunion was over. Johnston told reporter Mark Dillon in mid-June that the current tour was "a one-time event. You’re not going to see this next year. I'm busy next year doing my thing with Mike.” On June 25, Ledbetter sent another e-mail asking to disregard her last message, but by then, Love claimed that "it was too late. We had booked other concerts, and promoters had begun selling tickets." Despite this, in July, Love stated, "There's talk of us going and doing a return to the Grammys next year, and there's talk about doing another album together. There's nothing in stone, but there's a lot of ideas being floated around. So after this year, after completing the 50th anniversary reunion, we'll entertain doing some more studio work and see what we can come up with and can do in the future."

Ultimately, the reunion tour ended in September 2012 as planned, after a final show on September 28, but amid erroneous rumors that Love had dismissed Wilson from the Beach Boys. At this time, Love and Johnston had announced via a press release that following the end of the reunion tour the Beach Boys would revert to the pre-reunion tour Love/Johnston lineup, without Brian, Jardine, or Marks, all of whom expressed surprise. Although such dates were noted in a late June issue of Rolling Stone, it was widely reported that the three had been "fired". Love later wrote that the end of the reunion came partly as a result of 'interference' from Brian's wife and manager Melinda Ledbetter-Wilson and that he (Love) "had wanted to send out a joint press release, between Brian and me, formally announcing the end of the reunion tour on September 28. But I couldn't get Brian's management team on board..."

On October 5, Love responded in a self-written press release to the Los Angeles Times stating he "did not fire Brian Wilson from the Beach Boys. I cannot fire Brian Wilson from the Beach Boys ... I do not have such authority. And even if I did, I would never fire Brian Wilson from the Beach Boys." He claimed that nobody in the band "wanted to do a 50th anniversary tour that lasted 10 years" and that its limited run "was long agreed upon". On October 9, Wilson and Jardine submitted a written response to the rumors stating: "I was completely blindsided by his press release ... We hadn't even discussed as a band what we were going to do with all the offers that were coming in for more 50th shows."

==== Continued touring (2012–present) ====
From late September, Love and Johnston continued to perform under the Beach Boys name, while Wilson, Jardine, and Marks toured as a trio in 2013, and a subsequent tour with guitarist Jeff Beck also included Blondie Chaplin at select dates. Wilson and Jardine continued to tour together in 2014 and following years, often joined by Chaplin; Marks declined to join them after 2013.

Despite the acrimonious end of the 2011-2012 reunion, Jardine and Marks appeared at a one-off show with the Love/Johnston touring band in 2014, the Ella Awards where Love was honored as a singer. Love and Johnston's touring band was joined by Marks for several dates in 2014 and 2015, including a show in Jones Beach, California on July 5, 2014, where promoters had asked Jardine to appear. Ultimately, this plan fell through, with Jardine continuing to join Wilson, with whom he had toured since 2013. Foskett rejoined the touring band in 2014, with Love's son departing at the same time. Shortly afterward, Kirsch was replaced by former Four Freshmen vocalist Brian Eichenberger. In 2016, saxophonist/flautist Randy Leago was added, marking the first time since 1998 (with the exception of Paul von Mertens during the 2012 reunion tour) that the touring band included a woodwind player. Eichenberger left the touring band in 2018; Kirsch was a substitute before Eichenberger was replaced by Frankie Valli and The Four Seasons bassist Keith Hubacher. Christian Love rejoined the touring band in 2018 as a second rhythm guitarist. Jeff Foskett would leave the band in 2019 due to undergoing throat surgery and would be replaced by Brian Eichenberger. Foskett made occasional appearances with the band between 2019 and his death from thyroid cancer in 2023.

Besides Johnston and longtime Canadian keyboardist Tim Bonhomme, both Cowsill and Totten were two of the longest-tenured touring musicians in the band's 60-year history until they were both dismissed in early 2023. They were replaced by Jon Bolton and John Wedemeyer, the latter formerly from the Righteous Brothers' band. In July, the touring band performed three consecutive dates at the Hollywood Bowl in Los Angeles on July 2–4, 2024; they were joined at all three shows by regular guest performer John Stamos.

After Wilson retired from touring in 2022, Jardine reformed Wilson's supporting band as the Pet Sounds Band for a series of concert tours starting in 2025. Wilson died of respiratory arrest on June 11, 2025, at the age of 82. On March 4, 2026, Johnston announced he was quitting the Beach Boys again in order to focus on his solo career, though said that he would appear with the band on special occasions.

Love began experiencing health issues in mid-2026, which led to the Beach Boys canceling or rescheduling concerts. Variety noted that Love was a "less robust presence on stage" when the band performed a series of concerts at the Hollywood Bowl in early July. On July 23, Love's Instagram account posted a message stating the Beach Boys would be taking time off from the road until September to "recharge". In September, the band's scheduled tour dates for that month were canceled, raising further concerns about Love's health. On October 10, the band performed their first public concert since July. Love, who was walked onstage and sat for the duration of the show, was described as "alarmingly frail" by Rolling Stone and sang only occasional backing vocals.

On October 11, 2026, as Love's Beach Boys played a concert in Nashville, Tennessee, Jardine and the Pet Sounds Band performed in Cerritos, California. Jardine was joined onstage by guests Johnston, Marks, Dean Torrence, Marilyn Wilson, and Carnie Wilson. This was Jardine's first performance with Johnston since 2014, and with Torrence since 2010.

In a statement released through New York Times on October 22, 2026, Love confirmed that he was currently attending a rehab facility, and added that he hoped to "get back to the music and the best fans in the world."

On October 28, the Beach Boys pulled out of their planned November 11 and 12 performances at the Epcot International Food & Wine Festival. The band were replaced at these shows by "John Stamos and the California Sound", a group consisting of the touring members of The Beach Boys alongside actor John Stamos. On November 9, the group canceled their final scheduled concert of the year at the Hard Rock Hotel & Casino Bristol in Virginia on November 13. The group currently has one concert, described as a "makeup date" in Alberta, Canada, scheduled for 2027.

== Touring members ==
The following only pertains to the Beach Boys' touring band. Official members are in bold.

=== Current ===
Image	Name	Years active	Instruments	Release contributions
	**Mike Love**	1961–present	vocals; tambourine; percussion; saxophone; electro-theremin (1966-1974)	all releases
	Tim Bonhomme	1995–present (hiatus in 2012)	keyboards	none to date
	Christian Love	2006–2014; 2018–present (hiatus in 2012)	vocals; rhythm guitar	Songs from Here & Back (2006); That's Why God Made the Radio (2012)
	Brian Eichenberger	2015–2017; 2019–present	vocals; rhythm guitar (2019-present); bass (2015-2017)	none to date
	Randy Leago	2016–present	saxophone; flute; harmonica; percussion	none to date
	Keith Hubacher	2018–present	bass; occasional backing vocals	none to date
	John Wedemeyer	2023–present	lead guitar; vocals	none to date
	Jon Bolton	2023–present	drums; vocals	none to date
	Chris Cron	2026–present	keyboards; percussion; vocals	none to date

Note

- Since 1985, actor John Stamos has appeared at select concerts and other live performances, contributing vocals, guitar, drums, percussion, and electronic drums.

=== Past ===
==== Founders ====
Image	Name	Years active	Instruments	Release contributions
	**Carl Wilson**	1961–1981; 1982–1997 (died 1998)	vocals; guitar; keyboards; bass; drums; percussion; ukulele	all releases, except That's Why God Made the Radio (2012)
	**Dennis Wilson**	1961–1979; 1980–1983 (died 1983)	vocals; drums; keyboards; percussion; harmonica	all releases, except "California Dreamin'" (1982, 1986), "Chasin' the Sky" (1984), "East Meets West" (1984), The Beach Boys (1985), "Rock 'n' Roll to the Rescue" (1986), "Happy Endings" (1987), Still Cruisin' (1989), "Problem Child" (1990), "Crocodile Rock" (1991), Summer in Paradise (1992), Stars and Stripes Vol. 1 (1996), "Don't Fight the Sea" (2011), and That's Why God Made the Radio (2012)
	**Brian Wilson**	1961–1964; 1976–1983; 2012 (occasional special guest 1965-1967, 1970, 1984–1990, 1995, 1996; died 2025)	vocals; bass; piano; organ; keyboards; drums; percussion; accordion; harmonica; guitar; timpani	all releases, except Live in London (1970), The Beach Boys in Concert (1973), "Happy Endings" (1987), “Kokomo” (1988), "Problem Child" (1990), "Crocodile Rock" (1991), Summer in Paradise (1992), and The Beach Boys On Tour 1968 (2018)
	**Al Jardine**	1961–1962; 1963–1998; 2012 (guest 2011, 2014)	vocals; guitar; bass; banjo; piano; electronic drums; percussion	all releases, except Surfin' U.S.A. (1963)

==== 1960s additions ====
Image	Name	Years active	Instruments	Release contributions
	**David Marks**	1962–1963; 1997–1999; 2012 (guest 1971, 1995, 2008, occasional guest 2014–2016)	vocals; guitar; drums (1963)	Surfin' Safari (1962); Surfin' U.S.A. (1963); Surfer Girl (1963); Little Deuce Coupe (1963); The Beach Boys' Christmas Album (1964) disputed; That's Why God Made the Radio (2012); Live – The 50th Anniversary Tour (2013)
	Glen Campbell	1964–1965 (died 2017)	vocals; guitar; bass	All Summer Long (1964); The Beach Boys Today! (1965); Summer Days (And Summer Nights!!) (1965); Pet Sounds (1966)
	**Bruce Johnston**	1965–1972; 1978–2026; (occasional guest 1973–1977)	vocals; piano; keyboards; bass; percussion; guitar (1978); mandolin (1971)	all releases from Summer Days (And Summer Nights!!) (1965) onwards, except "Child of Winter" (1974), M.I.U. Album (1978), Ultimate Christmas (1998), Live in Chicago 1965 (2015), and Becoming the Beach Boys: The Complete Hite and Dorinda Morgan Sessions (2016)
	Ron Brown	1967–1968	bass; percussion	Wild Honey (1967)
	Daryl Dragon	1967–1972 (died 2019)	keyboards; vibraphone; bass (1968-1970)	20/20 (1969); Live in London (1970); Sunflower (1970); Surf's Up (1971); Carl and the Passions – "So Tough" (1972); 15 Big Ones (1976); Keepin' the Summer Alive (1980); The Beach Boys On Tour: 1968 (2018)
	Doug Dragon	1968	piano; organ	none
	Dennis Dragon	1968–1972 (died 2017)	percussion	Sunflower (1970); Surf's Up (1971); 15 Big Ones (1976); The Beach Boys On Tour: 1968 (2018)
	Joel Peskin	1968–1972; 2000–2001	woodwinds	Surf's Up (1971); L.A. (Light Album) (1979); Still Cruisin' (1989); Songs from Here & Back (2006)
	Ed Carter	1968–1981; 1982–1995	bass; guitar; percussion (1968-1972); harmony and backing vocals (1980-1981, 1982-1995); synth bass	20/20 (1969); Live in London (1970); Sunflower (1970); Surf's Up (1971); The Beach Boys in Concert (1973); 15 Big Ones (1976); M.I.U. Album (1978); L.A. (Light Album) (1979); Good Timin': Live at Knebworth England 1980 (2002); Songs from Here & Back (2006); The Beach Boys On Tour: 1968 (2018)
	Mike Kowalski	1968; 1970–1973; 1977–1978; 1981–2007	percussion; drums; synthesizer; electronic drums (1984-1988)	20/20 (1969); Live in London (1970); Surf's Up (1971); The Beach Boys in Concert (1973); M.I.U. Album (1978); Still Cruisin' (1989); Songs from Here & Back (2006); The Beach Boys On Tour: 1968 (2018)

==== 1970s additions ====
Image	Name	Years active	Instruments	Release contributions
	Luther Coffee	1970	bass	none
	Bobby Torres	1971–1972	percussion	none
	Billy Hinsche	1971–1977; 1982–1996 (one-off guest/substitute in 1969) (died 2021)	vocals; keyboards; piano; organ; synthesizer; percussion; guitar; bass; harmonica	Beach Boys' Party! (1965); Smiley Smile (1967); Carl and the Passions – "So Tough" (1972); Holland (1973); The Beach Boys in Concert (1973); 15 Big Ones (1976); Love You (1977); M.I.U. Album (1978); L.A. (Light Album) (1979); Songs from Here & Back (2006)
	**Ricky Fataar**	1971–1974	vocals; drums; percussion; rhythm guitar; pedal steel guitar; keyboards; flute	Carl and the Passions – "So Tough" (1972); Holland (1973); The Beach Boys in Concert (1973); 15 Big Ones (1976); M.I.U. Album (1978); Keepin' the Summer Alive (1980); Songs from Here & Back (2006); Feel Flows (2021); Sail On Sailor: 1972 (2022)
	Sal Marquez	1971	Trumpet	Surf's Up (1971)
	Carli Muñoz	1971; 1973–1977; 1978–1979	keyboards; percussion	The Beach Boys in Concert (1973); L.A. (Light Album) (1979); Keepin' the Summer Alive (1980); Songs from Here & Back (2006)
	Toni Tennille	1972	keyboards; backing vocals	Carl and the Passions – "So Tough" (1972); 15 Big Ones (1976)
	Charles Lloyd	1972; 1976–1978	woodwinds; percussion	Holland (1973); 15 Big Ones (1976); M.I.U. Album (1978)
	**Blondie Chaplin**	1972–1973 (guest 1995)	vocals; guitar; slide guitar; bass; tambourine	Surf's Up (1971); Carl and the Passions – "So Tough" (1972); Holland (1973); The Beach Boys in Concert (1973); Feel Flows (2021); Sail On Sailor: 1972 (2022)
	Joe Pollard	1973	drums; percussion	The Beach Boys in Concert (1973)
	Richard "Didymus" Washington	1973	percussion	The Beach Boys in Concert (1973)
	Robert Kenyatta	1973; 1974	percussion	The Beach Boys in Concert (1973)
	Putter Smith	1973	bass	none
	James Guercio	1974–1975	bass	L.A. (Light Album) (1979)
	Bobby Figueroa	1974–1981; 1984–1988 (guest 2012)	vocals; percussion; drums; electric piano; electronic drums (1984-1988)	L.A. (Light Album) (1979); Good Timin': Live at Knebworth England 1980 (2002); Songs from Here & Back (2006)
	Don Lewis	1974 (died 2022)	keyboards	none
	Ron Altbach	1976–1978	keyboards; trombone	M.I.U. Album (1978); L.A. (Light Album) (1979)
	John Foss	1976–1978	trumpet	M.I.U. Album (1978)
	Michael Andreas	1976–1978	woodwinds	M.I.U. Album (1978); L.A. (Light Album) (1979)
	Rod Novak	1976–1978	saxophone	M.I.U. Album (1978); L.A. (Light Album) (1979)
	Charlie McCarthy	1976–1978	saxophone	none
	Lance Buller	1976–1978	trumpet; trombone	M.I.U. Album (1978)
	Gary Griffin	1977–1978; 2002	keyboards	M.I.U. Album (1978); Summer in Paradise (1992); That's Why God Made the Radio (2012)
	Sterling Smith	1978–1979 (died 2023)	piano; keyboards	L.A. (Light Album) (1979)
	Mike Meros	1979–2001 (died 2007)	keyboards; organ; synthesizer; piano	Keepin' the Summer Alive (1980); Good Timin': Live at Knebworth England 1980 (2002); Songs from Here & Back (2006)

==== 1980s additions ====
Image	Name	Years active	Instruments	Release contributions
	Joe Chemay	1980	bass; harmony and backing vocals; percussion	L.A. (Light Album) (1979); Good Timin': Live at Knebworth England 1980 (2002)
	Adrian Baker	1981–1982; 1990–1992; 1998–2004	vocals; guitar; electric piano (1981-1982, 1990-1992, 1998-1999)	Summer in Paradise (1992); Songs from Here & Back (2006); That's Why God Made the Radio (2012)
	Ernie Knapp	1981–1982; 1986	bass; rhythm guitar	none
	Jeff Foskett	1981–1990; 2012; 2014–2019 (died 2023)	vocals; rhythm guitar; lead guitar (1981-1990); percussion; mandolin (2012)	The Beach Boys (1985); Still Cruisin' (1989); Songs from Here & Back (2006); That's Why God Made the Radio (2012); Live – The 50th Anniversary Tour (2013)
	Matt Jardine	1988–1998 (guest 2011)	vocals; percussion; assistant stage manager (1986–1988)	Still Cruisin' (1989); Stars and Stripes Vol. 1 (1996); Songs from Here & Back (2006)

==== 1990s additions ====
Image	Name	Years active	Instruments	Release contributions
	John Renner	1991 (died 2017)	saxophone	none
	Richie Cannata	1991–1998	woodwinds; keyboard; percussion	Stars and Stripes Vol. 1 (1996); Songs from Here & Back (2006)
	Chris Farmer	1995–2007	vocals; bass; musical director (1998-2007)	none
	Phil Bardowell	1997–2001	vocals; lead guitar (1998-2001); rhythm guitar (1997-1999)	none

==== 2000s additions ====
Image	Name	Years active	Instruments	Release contributions
	John Cowsill	2001–2023 (occasional substitute 1999–2000)	vocals; drums; percussion; keyboards (2001-2007); rhythm guitar (1999–2000, 2002)	That's Why God Made the Radio (2012); Live – The 50th Anniversary Tour (2013)
	Scott Totten	2001–2023 (occasional substitute 1999–2000)	vocals; lead guitar; percussion; ukulele; rhythm guitar (2012); bass (2012); musical director (2007-2023)	Songs from Here & Back (2006); That's Why God Made the Radio (2012); Live – The 50th Anniversary Tour (2013)
	Paul Fauerso	2003	vocals; keyboards	none
	Randell Kirsch	2004–2015 (hiatus in 2012; guest 2018 & 2021)	vocals; rhythm guitar (2004-2007); bass (2007-2015, 2018); lead guitar (2021)	none

==== 2010s additions ====
Image	Name	Years active	Instruments	Release contributions
	Nicky "Wonder" Walusko	2012 (died 2019)	guitar	That's Why God Made the Radio (2012); Live – The 50th Anniversary Tour (2013)
	Probyn Gregory	2012	guitar; tannerin; backing vocals; bass; trombone; trumpet	That's Why God Made the Radio (2012); Live – The 50th Anniversary Tour (2013)
	Darian Sahanaja	2012	vocals; keyboards; vibraphone; percussion	That's Why God Made the Radio (2012); Live – The 50th Anniversary Tour (2013)
	Paul von Mertens	2012	saxophones; flutes; harmonicas	That's Why God Made the Radio (2012); Live – The 50th Anniversary Tour (2013)
	Scott Bennett	2012	keyboards; vibraphone; percussion; backing vocals	Songs from Here & Back (2006); That's Why God Made the Radio (2012); Live – The 50th Anniversary Tour (2013)
	Nelson Bragg	2012	percussion; backing vocals	Songs from Here & Back (2006); That's Why God Made the Radio (2012); Live – The 50th Anniversary Tour (2013)
	Mike D'Amico	2012	bass; backing vocals; drums	Live – The 50th Anniversary Tour (2013)
	Rob Bonfiglio	2019	vocals; rhythm guitar	none
	Matthew Jordan	2019	vocals; keyboards	none

== Discography ==
Live albums

- Beach Boys Concert (1964)
- Live in London (1970)
- The Beach Boys in Concert (1973)
- Good Timin': Live at Knebworth England 1980 (2002)
- Songs from Here & Back (2006)
- Live – The 50th Anniversary Tour (2013)
- Live in Sacramento 1964 (2014)
- Live in Chicago 1965 (2015)
- Graduation Day 1966: Live At The University Of Michigan (2016)
- 1967 – Live Sunshine (2017)
- The Beach Boys On Tour: 1968 (2018)
- 1973 Release (2023)

See also

- Lei'd in Hawaii (1967; unreleased until 2017, when it was included as part of 1967 - Sunshine Tomorrow and 1967 - Live Sunshine)

== Bibliography ==
- Badman, Keith (2004). The Beach Boys: The Definitive Diary of America's Greatest Band, on Stage and in the Studio. Backbeat Books. ISBN 978-0-87930-818-6.
- Bogdanov, Vladimir; Woodstra, Chris; Erlewine, Stephen Thomas, eds. (2002). All Music Guide to Rock: The Definitive Guide to Rock, Pop, and Soul. Backbeat Books. ISBN 978-0-87930-653-3.
- Carlin, Peter Ames (2006). Catch a Wave: The Rise, Fall, and Redemption of the Beach Boys' Brian Wilson. Rodale. ISBN 978-1-59486-320-2.
- Gaines, Steven (1986). Heroes and Villains: The True Story of The Beach Boys. New York: Da Capo Press. ISBN 0306806479.
- Harrison, Daniel (1997). "After Sundown: The Beach Boys' Experimental Music" (PDF). In Covach, John; Boone, Graeme M. (eds.). Understanding Rock: Essays in Musical Analysis. Oxford University Press. pp. 33–57. ISBN 9780199880126. Archived (PDF) from the original on May 24, 2015.
- Lambert, Philip, ed. (2016). Good Vibrations: Brian Wilson and the Beach Boys in Critical Perspective. University of Michigan Press. ISBN 978-0-472-11995-0. Archived from the original on February 16, 2017.
- Leaf, David (1978). The Beach Boys and the California Myth. New York: Grosset & Dunlap. ISBN 978-0-448-14626-3.
- Love, Mike (2016). Good Vibrations: My Life as a Beach Boy. Penguin Publishing Group. ISBN 978-0-698-40886-9.
- Miller, Jim (1992). "The Beach Boys". In DeCurtis, Anthony; Henke, James; George-Warren, Holly (eds.). The Rolling Stone Illustrated History of Rock & Roll: The Definitive History of the Most Important Artists and Their Music. New York: Random House. ISBN 9780679737285.
- Moskowitz, David V., ed. (2015). The 100 Greatest Bands of All Time: A Guide to the Legends Who Rocked the World. ABC-CLIO. ISBN 978-1-4408-0340-6.
- Murphy, James B. (2015). Becoming the Beach Boys, 1961–1963. McFarland. ISBN 978-0-7864-7365-6. Archived from the original on June 9, 2016.
- Priore, Domenic (2005). Smile: The Story of Brian Wilson's Lost Masterpiece. London: Sanctuary. ISBN 1860746276.
- Sanchez, Luis (2014). The Beach Boys' Smile. Bloomsbury Publishing. ISBN 978-1-62356-956-3.
- Schinder, Scott (2007). "The Beach Boys". In Schinder, Scott; Schwartz, Andy (eds.). Icons of Rock: An Encyclopedia of the Legends Who Changed Music Forever. Westport, Connecticut: Greenwood Press. ISBN 978-0313338458.
- Stebbins, Jon (2007). The Lost Beach Boy. Virgin Books. ISBN 978-1-85227-391-0.
- Warner, Jay (1992). American Singing Groups: A History from 1940s to Today. Hal Leonard Corporation. ISBN 978-0-634-09978-6.
- White, Timothy (1996). The Nearest Far Away Place: Brian Wilson, the Beach Boys, and the Southern California Experience. Henry Holt (P). ISBN 978-0-8050-4702-8.
- Wilson, Brian; Greenman, Ben (2016). I Am Brian Wilson: A Memoir. Da Capo Press. ISBN 978-0-306-82307-7. Archived from the original on July 26, 2020.
- Zager, Michael (2011). Music Production: For Producers, Composers, Arrangers, and Students (2nd ed.). Scarecrow Press. ISBN 978-0-8108-8201-0.
