= Pet Sounds (disambiguation) =

Pet Sounds is a 1966 album by the Beach Boys.

Pet Sounds may also refer to:

- The Pet Sounds Band, formerly Brian Wilson's band, featuring Beach Boys former members and associates.
- "Pet Sounds" (book), a 2013 book by Quinn Cummings
- "Pet Sounds" (instrumental), a track from the album Pet Sounds
- Pet Sounds: 10 Years of Rodent Rock, an album by The Hamsters
- Pet Sounds Studio, a recording studio
- Pet Sounds, a stage at the Oxegen music festival
- Animal sounds
