= A Postcard from California =

Studio album by Al Jardine
- Released: June 19, 2010
- Recorded: 1978–2010
- Genres: Pop; rock
- Length: 36:17
- Label: Fontana

Al Jardine chronology
Live in Las Vegas (2001)	A Postcard from California (2010)	Islands in the Sun (2025)

Singles from A Postcard from California
- 1. "Don't Fight the Sea" Released: April 16, 2011

A Postcard from California is the debut solo studio album by American musician Al Jardine, co-founder of the Beach Boys. It was released on June 19, 2010, through Fontana Records.

For the album, Jardine collaborated with many prominent musicians including several Beach Boys members (Brian Wilson, Mike Love, David Marks, Bruce Johnston; Carl Wilson appears posthumously, via archival recordings edited into the album). Other guest musicians include Glen Campbell, America, Steve Miller, Flea, David Crosby, Stephen Stills, and Neil Young.

A Postcard from California contains several previously unreleased songs by the Beach Boys, including "Don't Fight the Sea", "Lookin' Down the Coast", "California Feelin'", and "And I Always Will." "Don't Fight the Sea" includes parts of a Beach Boys' recording (from the L.A. (Light Album) and Still Cruisin' sessions), while "Lookin' Down the Coast", "California Feelin'", and "And I Always Will" are re-recordings (the first two of these three from the L.A. (Light Album) sessions and the latter from the sessions for the band's self-titled album). "Tidepool Interlude" features a spoken word piece written by former Beach Boys collaborator Stephen Kalinich and performed by actor Alec Baldwin.

Jardine added "Waves of Love" as one of the bonus tracks on his 2012 reissue of the album. Intentionally or not, the digital and CD versions of the 2012 reissue contained entirely different versions of the song. The CD included a more laid-back, live soundcheck-sounding version, with Carl Wilson's lead buried among other voices, while the digital version contained a much more "produced" and punchy version in a different key and with Carl's lead brought to the fore. There is a third version of "Waves of Love" on the Japanese version. As of August 2022, the album is again available on digital streaming services, after having been unavailable for some time.

== Track listing ==
No.	Title	Writer(s)	Length
1.	"A Postcard from California" (featuring Glen Campbell)	Al Jardine	4:59
2.	"California Feelin'"	Brian Wilson, Stephen Kalinich	2:03
3.	"Lookin' Down the Coast"	Jardine	3:45
4.	"Don't Fight the Sea" (featuring the Beach Boys)	Jardine, Terry Jacks	3:23
5.	"Tidepool Interlude" (featuring Alec Baldwin)	Kalinich, Scott Slaughter	1:38
6.	"Campfire Scene" (featuring Neil Young)	Jardine	0:44
7.	"A California Saga" (featuring Neil Young, David Crosby and Stephen Stills)	Jardine	2:52
8.	"Help Me, Rhonda" (featuring Steve Miller)	Wilson, Mike Love	3:47
9.	"San Simeon" (featuring America)	Jardine, Scott Slaughter	2:48
10.	"Drivin'" (featuring Brian Wilson and David Marks)	Jardine, Stevie Heger, Scott Slaughter	3:12
11.	"Honkin' Down the Highway" (featuring Brian Wilson)	Wilson	3:12
12.	"California Dreamin'" (featuring Glen Campbell)	John Phillips, Michelle Phillips	2:50
13.	"And I Always Will"	Jardine	2:23
Total length:			36:17

2012 reissue bonus tracks
No.	Title	Writer(s)	Length
14.	"Waves of Love" (featuring Carl Wilson)	Jardine, Larry Dvoskin	3:51
15.	"Sloop John B"	Traditional, arranged by Jardine	4:03
Total length:			44:11

2012 Japanese reissue bonus tracks
No.	Title	Writer(s)	Length
14.	"Waves of Love" (alternate version) (featuring Carl Wilson)	Jardine, Dvoskin	3:51
15.	"The Eternal Ballad"	Ching Hai, Jardine	2:30
Total length:			42:38

== Personnel ==
=== Musicians ===
- Al Jardine – lead vocals, guitars (tracks 1, 3, 7, 9, 12, 14), backing vocals (tracks 2, 4, 7, 9, 10), keyboards (track 4), banjo (tracks 6, 7), bass (tracks 6, 9, 15), piano (track 7), handclaps (track 8), 12-string guitar (track 15), harmonica (track 15)

Additional musicians

- Ella Bacon – viola (tracks 1, 13)
- Alec Baldwin – spoken word (track 5)
- Flea – bass (track 8)
- Peter Basil – cajon (track 12)
- Gerry Beckley – backing vocals (tracks 9, 10), lead vocals (track 10)
- Marandi Bostetter – violin (tracks 1, 13)
- Norton Buffalo – harmonica (track 8)
- Dewey Bunnell – lead vocals (tracks 9, 10), backing vocals (tracks 9, 10)
- Glen Campbell – lead vocals (tracks 1, 12)
- Richie Cannata – baritone saxophone (track 11)
- Ed Carter – guitars (track 4), bass (tracks 4, 14)
- David Crosby – lead vocals (tracks 6, 12), backing vocals (track 7)
- Larry Dvoskin – synth keys (track 14)
- Sally Dworsky – backing vocals (track 1)
- William Faulkner – Jalisco harp (tracks 3, 9)
- Bobby Figueroa – drums (track 4)
- Priscilla Fisher – violin (tracks 1, 13)
- Probyn Gregory – French horn (track 3)
- Stevie Heger – drums (tracks 1, 3, 7, 8–11, 13, 15), backing vocals (tracks 2, 10), percussion (tracks 3, 5, 10, 13, 15), cowbell (track 11), "really big 'Queen style' vocals" (track 11)
- The Hillbillies – vocals (track 6)
- Adam Jardine – backing vocals (tracks 2, 7, 9, 11)
- Drew Jardine – backing vocals (track 7), 5-string banjo (track 15)
- Mary Ann Jardine – "really big 'Queen style' vocals" (track 11)
- Matt Jardine – backing vocals (tracks 2, 4, 8, 9, 11), handclaps (track 8), lead vocals (tracks 14, 15)
- Bruce Johnston – backing vocals (track 4)
- Dan Knutson – guitars (track 14)
- Mike Kowalski – drums (track 14)
- Michael Lent – guitars (tracks 1, 3, 4, 7–9, 11, 13), acoustic guitar (track 5), banjo (track 7), mandolin (track 7), lead guitar (track 10), "really big 'Queen style' vocals" (track 11)
- Paul Logan – backing vocals (track 1), bass (tracks 1, 3, 7, 10, 11, 13), "really big 'Queen style' vocals" (track 11)
- Mike Love – backing vocals (track 4)
- Gary Mallaber – drums (tracks 1, 8)
- David Marks – lead guitar (track 10)
- Scott Mathews – guitars (track 4), backing vocals (track 4)
- Mike Meros – keyboards (track 4), Hammond B-3 organ (track 14)
- Steve Miller – guitars (track 8), backing vocals (track 8), lead vocals (track 8)
- Johnnie Mirani – harmonica (tracks 2, 6, 10)
- Luana Pedota – backing vocals (track 1), percussion (tracks 1, 9), accordion (track 9)
- Jeff Peters – handclaps (track 8)
- Barry Phillips – cello (tracks 1, 13)
- Shelley Phillips – oboe (track 1), English horn (track 13)
- Emily Poile – backing vocals (track 1)
- Steve Robertson – percussion (track 9)
- Scott Slaughter – piano (tracks 1, 2, 5, 8, 10, 11, 13), keyboards (tracks 1, 2, 7, 9), backing vocals (tracks 2, 9, 10), sound effects (track 3), percussion (track 6), Hammond B-3 organ (tracks 10, 12), "really big 'Queen style' vocals" (track 11), Mini Moog (track 11), bell tree (track 11), guitars (12)
- John Stamos – bongos (track 12)
- Stephen Stills – backing vocals (track 7)
- Brian Wilson – backing vocals (tracks 4, 10, 11), lead vocals (tracks 10, 11)
- Carl Wilson – lead vocals (tracks 4, 14), backing vocals (track 4)
- Neil Young – lead vocals (tracks 6, 7), backing vocals (tracks 6, 7)

=== Technical ===
- Scott Slaughter & Barry Phillips – string arrangements (track 13)
- Damien Rasmussen, Jeff Peters, Richard Bryant, Stevie Heger – engineers
- Jeff Peters – mixing
- Alan De Moss, Beau Floch, Chris Constable, Nels Jensen – mixing assistants
- Joe Gastwirt – mastering
- Drew Jardine, Lee Dempsey, Mary Ann Jardine, Rachael Short, Robbie Jardine, Tim Brown, Trisha Campo – photography
- Al Jardine – sleeve notes
- Kenta Hagiwara – liner notes
- Mark London – art direction, package design
- Alan Arellano – additional cover art
