= Add Some Music to Your Day =

Single by the Beach Boys

from the album Sunflower
- B-side: "Susie Cincinnati"
- Released: February 23, 1970
- Recorded: October 28, 1969 – January 1970
- Studio: Beach Boys, Bel Air
- Genre: Folk pop
- Length: 3:34
- Label: Brother/Reprise
- Songwriters: Brian Wilson, Joe Knott, Mike Love
- Producer: The Beach Boys

The Beach Boys singles chronology
"Break Away" (1969)	"Add Some Music to Your Day" (1970)	"Cottonfields" (1970)

"Add Some Music to Your Day" is a song by the American rock band the Beach Boys that was released in the US on February 23, 1970 as the lead single from their album Sunflower. It was written by Brian Wilson, Joe Knott, and Mike Love. Wilson later said that Knott "was a friend of mine who wasn't a songwriter but he contributed a couple of lines. But I can't remember which ones!"

The song features lyrics that are a celebration of music and its ubiquitous presence in daily life. In April, the single peaked at number 64 in the US during a five-week stay. Disc jockeys generally refused to play the song on the radio, with one DJ reportedly stating that the Beach Boys "aren't hip anymore". According to band promoter Fred Vail, WFIL program director Jay Cook refused to play the song even after "telling me how great the Beach Boys are and how great Brian is."

Cash Box said "the Beach Boys strike up a whole new brand of teen excitement tinged with a trace of their old 'Good Vibrations' work sparked with vitality." Record World said it has "the same magic sounds that made them famous." Billboard called it an "original, easy-beat rhythm number."

In 2021, a new recording of the song (credited as a new iteration of California Music, which had been the name of a previous project featuring Bruce Johnston, Brian Wilson, Terry Melcher, Curt Boettcher, and others) was organized and produced by David Beard, the editor and publisher of the Beach Boys fanzine Endless Summer Quarterly. The new re-recording reunited Love, Al Jardine, and Johnston from the original recording, alongside fellow Beach Boy David Marks (who was not a member when the original version was recorded). It also featured several of the band members' children: Carnie and Wendy Wilson (daughters of Brian); Justyn Wilson (son of Carl); Christian, Hayleigh, and Ambha Love; and Matt Jardine. The single was released on April 23, 2021; it and an associated album) were both released by Omnivore Recordings as a benefit project for Feeding America during the COVID-19 pandemic. This re-recording of “Add Some Music to Your Day” was the first studio recording (and only to date) to feature Mike Love, Al Jardine, Johnston, and Marks together since the end of the 2011-2012 50th anniversary reunion.

== Personnel ==
Sourced from Craig Slowinski.

The Beach Boys

- Al Jardine – lead vocals, harmony and backing vocals
- Bruce Johnston – lead vocals, harmony and backing vocals, bass
- Mike Love – lead vocals, harmony and backing vocals
- Brian Wilson – lead vocals, harmony and backing vocals, Rocksichord, production
- Carl Wilson – lead vocals, harmony and backing vocals, 12-string acoustic guitars, Chamberlin
- Dennis Wilson – harmony and backing vocals, drums, percussion (flicked car and house keys, bongos, guiro, Jaw harp)

Production staff

- Stephen Desper – engineer

== Charts ==
Chart (1970)	Peak position
US Billboard Hot 100	64
