= California Music =

1970s American rock supergroup

- Origin: Los Angeles, California, U.S.
- Years active: 1974–1976, 2021
- Labels: Equinox, Omnivore
- Spinoff of: The Beach Boys
- Past members: Bruce Johnston; Terry Melcher; Brian Wilson; Gary Usher; Dean Torrence; Curt Boettcher; Mike Love; Al Jardine; David Marks; Carnie Wilson; Wendy Wilson; Matt Jardine; Justyn Wilson; Christian Love; Hayleigh Love; Ambha Love

California Music was an American rock supergroup that formed in Los Angeles, California, in 1974. It was originally a loose collective of studio musicians, with participation from Bruce Johnston, Terry Melcher, Gary Usher, Curt Boettcher, Dean Torrence, and Brian Wilson. Equinox Records released three singles by the group from 1974 to 1976, after which the band went inactive. In 2021, the group was reformed by members of the Beach Boys and their children. Omnivore Recordings released their first album: California Music Presents Add Some Music.

== History ==
=== Original iteration ===
The group was conceived by former Beach Boy Bruce Johnston and Terry Melcher. Though still under contract to Warner Bros. Records, Brian Wilson signed a sideline production deal with Johnston and Melcher's Equinox Records in early 1975. Together, they attempted to establish the loose-knit music collective with Gary Usher and Curt Boettcher. Biographer John Tobler described the project as involving Johnston, Melcher, Wilson, Dean Torrence, "and a few others ... who had recorded previously as the Legendary Masked Surfers." Wilson was paid a bonus advance of $25,000, described by Johnston as "probably the highest production royalty any producer's ever received." Due to Wilson's irresponsible expenditures, his income had been redirected to the bank account of his wife Marilyn. According to biographer Timothy White, Wilson "begged her" to place the money in an account separate to hers.

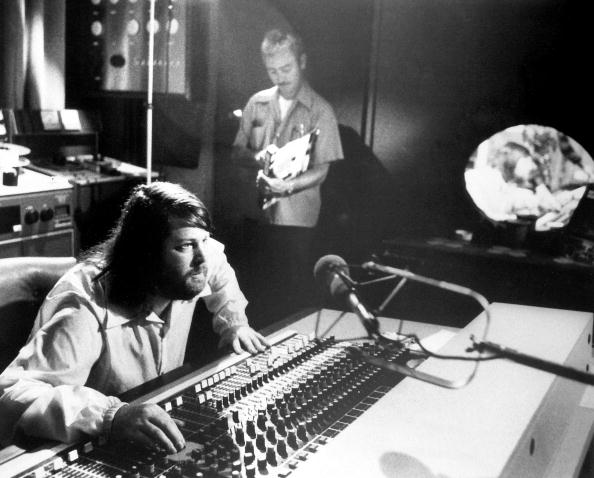
Brian Wilson in the studio, 1976

Wilson was involved with California Music's renditions of "Why Do Fools Fall in Love" and "Jamaica Farewell", acting as co-producer, instrumentalist, and backing vocalist. Melcher spoke of his contributions: "He wouldn't even touch anything in the control booth; he acted like he was afraid to. He'd offer suggestions, but he wouldn't go near the board. He knows his reputation, so he makes a lot of unfinished records; sometimes, I feel that he feels that he's peaked and does not want to put his stamp on records so that peers will have a Brian Wilson track to criticize." Melcher was reportedly "crushed" upon seeing Wilson in his poor mental and physical state, unable to recognize his former Wrecking Crew associates that Melcher had hired for the project. According to biographer Steven Gaines, Wilson refused to finish any more tracks for California Music.

Wilson remembered meeting Elvis Presley at RCA Victor Studio on the day of recording "Why Do Fools Fall in Love" and inviting the singer to listen to what they had recorded. According to Memphis Mafia member Jerry Schilling, "After a few tracks, Brian says, 'Well? Do you think they're any good?' Elvis looks up and replies, 'Nah,' before leaving. I don't think he had any idea that the guy was Brian Wilson."

Pursuant to his contract with Warner Bros., Wilson was liable to be sued by the label if he did not contribute a certain percentage to the Beach Boys' studio recordings. Johnston recalled, "Brian spent a day and night talking to us about it; he was really desperate for an outlet, because basically the deal at Warners was for the Beach Boys." At the behest of Marilyn, he was legally ousted from California Music in order to focus his undivided attention on the Beach Boys, who perceived the side project as Brian's attempt to pay for his growing drug expenses. Mike Love's brother and Beach Boys manager Stephen Love said, "He [Brian] said to me 'Don't try to reach me! Don't try to get to me!' He was so upset Marilyn didn't want [the Equinox deal] to happen." The bonus advance was soon transferred to an account belonging to Marilyn at a different bank.

In the meantime, the Beach Boys' recent Endless Summer compilation was a great commercial hit, and the band — without Brian — was touring non-stop, making them the biggest live draw in the United States. According to Love: "We were under contract with Warner Bros., and we couldn't have him going on a tangent. If he was going to be productive, it's gotta be for the Beach Boys." With Wilson gone, California Music immediately disintegrated. Afterward, Boettcher soon collaborated with Johnston and the Beach Boys on the 1979 disco version of their song "Here Comes the Night", which appeared on the album L.A. (Light Album) and marked Johnston's return to the Beach Boys.

=== Reformation ===
In 2021, a new iteration of California Music was organized and produced by David Beard, the editor and publisher of the Beach Boys fanzine Endless Summer Quarterly. The grouping consisted of Johnston and fellow Beach Boys Mike Love, Al Jardine, and David Marks, as well as children of the band members: Carnie and Wendy Wilson (daughters of Brian); Justyn Wilson (son of Carl); Christian, Hayleigh, and Ambha Love; and Matt Jardine. Their debut album, California Music Presents Add Some Music, was released via Omnivore Recordings on April 23, 2021. The re-recording of “Add Some Music To Your Day” was the first studio recording to feature Mike Love, Al Jardine, Johnston, and Marks together since the end of the 50th Reunion Tour in 2012.

== Discography ==
Album

- California Music Presents Add Some Music (2021)

Singles

- "Don't Worry Baby" (b/w "Ten Years Harmony") (1974)
- "Why Do Fools Fall in Love" (b/w "Don't Worry Baby") (1975)
- "Jamaica Farewell" (b/w "California Music") (1976)
- "Add Some Music to Your Day" (2021)

== See also ==
- California Sound
