= Songs from Here & Back =

Live album by The Beach Boys
- Released: May 15, 2006
- Recorded: 1974, 1989, 2003 and 2005
- Genre: Rock
- Length: 32:11
- Label: Hallmark Cards
- Producer: Mark Linett, Alan Boyd, Brian Wilson, Paul Fauerso, Al Jardine

The Beach Boys chronology
The Platinum Collection (Sounds of Summer Edition) (2005)	Songs from Here & Back (2006)	Good Vibrations: 40th Anniversary Edition (2006)

Professional ratings
Review scores
Source	Rating
Allmusic	3/5 stars
The Encyclopedia of Popular Music	3/5 stars

Songs from Here & Back is a 2006 live album by The Beach Boys released through Hallmark Gold Crown Stores and only available for two months. The album contains seven never-before-released live recordings, as well as three solo studio recordings, one new recording each by Brian Wilson and Mike Love, and a previously released Al Jardine song. The live tracks were recorded in 1989 except "Wouldn't It Be Nice" and "Good Vibrations" which are from 1974.

== Track listing ==
1. "Intro" – 0:27
2. "Dance, Dance, Dance" – 2:08
3. "Wouldn't It Be Nice" – 2:42
4. "Surfer Girl" – 3:01
5. "Kokomo" – 4:33
6. "Car Medley Intro" – 1:18
7. "Little Deuce Coupe" – 1:46
8. "I Get Around" – 2:26
9. "Good Vibrations" – 4:38
10. "The Spirit of Rock & Roll" (Brian Wilson solo) – 3:09
11. "PT Cruiser" (Al Jardine solo) – 2:47
12. "Cool Head, Warm Heart" (Mike Love solo) – 3:15

== Personnel ==
Personnel per 2006 liner notes.

=== 1989 live songs ===
- Brian Wilson – vocals, possible keyboards
- Mike Love – vocals
- Al Jardine – vocals, rhythm guitar
- Carl Wilson – vocals, lead guitar
- Bruce Johnston – vocals, keyboards

with

- Ed Carter – bass
- Jeff Foskett – vocals, rhythm guitar
- Billy Hinsche – vocals, keyboards
- Matt Jardine – vocals, percussion
- Mike Meros – keyboards
- Mike Kowalski – drums

=== 1974 live songs (“Wouldn’t It Be Nice” and “Good Vibrations”) ===
- Mike Love – vocals, electro-theremin on “Good Vibrations”
- Al Jardine – vocals, rhythm guitar
- Carl Wilson – vocals, lead guitar
- Dennis Wilson – vocals
- Ricky Fataar – drums

with

- Ron Altbach – keyboards
- Ed Carter – bass
- Bobby Figueroa – percussion
- Billy Hinsche – vocals, keyboards
- Carli Munoz – keyboards

=== “The Spirit of Rock and Roll” ===
- Brian Wilson – vocals, piano
- Scott Bennett – vocals, guitar, bass
- Nelson Bragg – vocals, drums, percussion
- Taylor Mills – vocals
- Joel Peskin – saxophone

=== “PT Cruiser” ===
- Al Jardine – lead vocals, 12-string guitar
- Matt Jardine – backing vocals
- Adam Jardine – backing vocals
- Billy Hinsche – piano, musical director
- Ed Carter – bass
- Bobby Figueroa – drums, percussion
- Craig Copeland – lead guitar
- Richie Cannata – tenor saxophone
- Tom Jacob – Hammond B-3 organ

=== “Cool Head, Warm Heart” ===
- Mike Love – lead and backing vocals
- Adrian Baker – backing vocals
- Christian Love – backing vocals
- Paul Fauerso – backing vocals, keyboards, percussion, programming
- Scott Totten – guitars
- Joel Peskin – tenor saxophone
- Cliff Hugo – bass
- Curt Bisquera – drums
