= Pet Sounds Band =

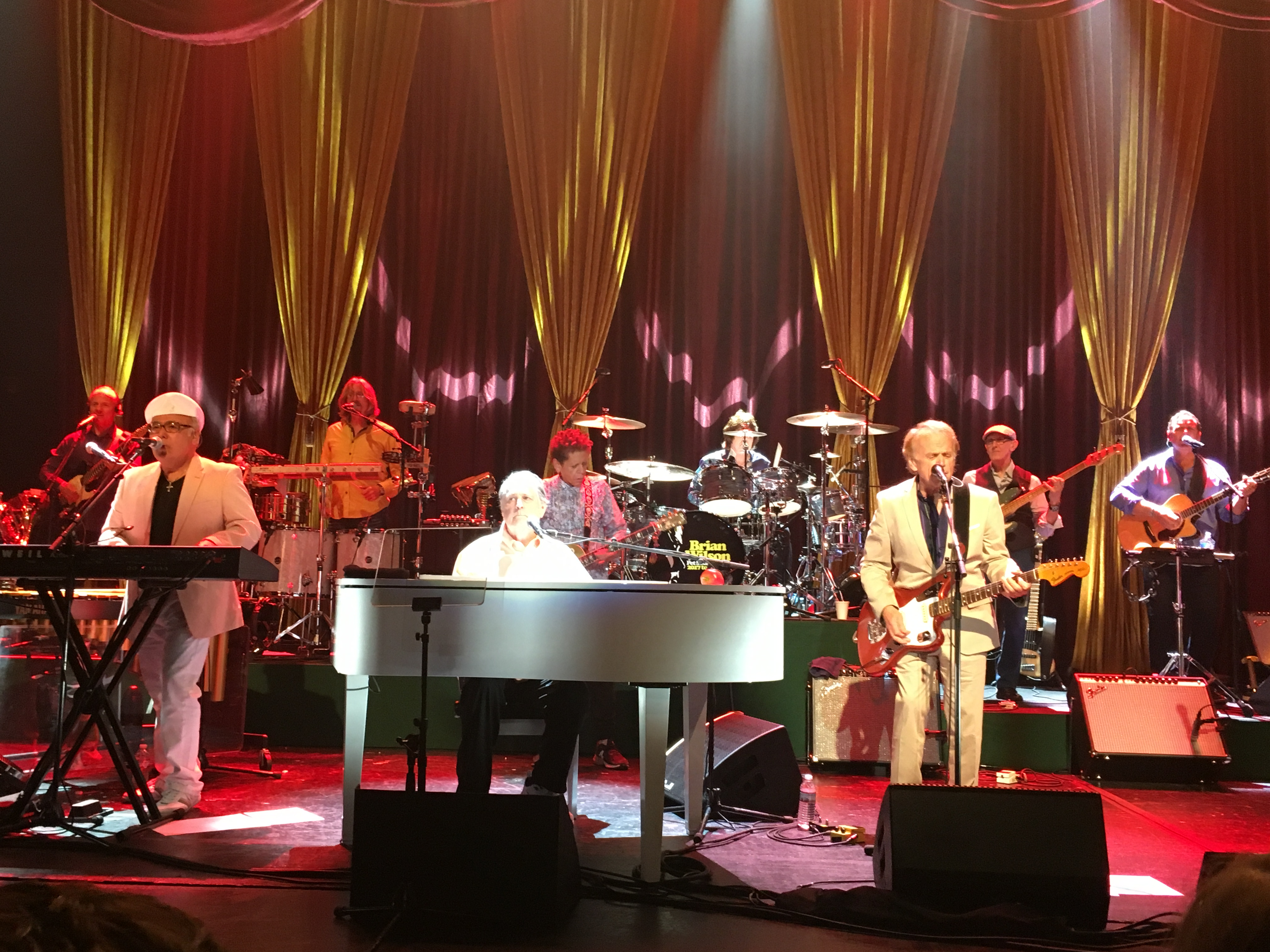
- The group performing in 2017. From left: Probyn Gregory, Billy Hinsche, Nelson Bragg, Brian Wilson, Blondie Chaplin, Mike D'Amico, Al Jardine, Bob Lizik, and Jim Laspesa.

Background information
- Also known as: Brian Wilson Band
- Origin: Los Angeles
- Genres: Rock; pop
- Years active: 1999–2022; 2025–present
- Spinoff of: The Beach Boys; Wondermints
- Members: Darian Sahanaja; Paul Von Mertens; Bob Lizik; Mike D'Amico; Al Jardine; Matt Jardine; Gary Griffin; Jim Laspesa; Rob Bonfiglio; Debbie Shair; Randell Kirsch; Emeen Zarookian; Brendan Carniaux
- Past members: Brian Wilson; Probyn Gregory; Nick Walusko; Scott Bennett; Jeff Foskett; Taylor Mills; Joe Thomas; Todd Sucherman; Steve Dahl; Jim Hines; Andy Paley; Nelson Bragg; Brett Simons; Billy Hinsche; David Marks; Blondie Chaplin

The Pet Sounds Band (formerly the Brian Wilson Band) is an American rock band that formed in Los Angeles, California. It was originally Brian Wilson's touring and recording group from 1999 to 2022. He first recruited Wondermints members Darian Sahanaja, Nick Walusko, Probyn Gregory, and Mike D'Amico, supplemented by former Beach Boys touring member Jeffrey Foskett and several Chicago-based players who had recorded with Wilson on his 1998 album Imagination.

The original ensemble performed continuously through the 2000s and 2010s and occasionally toured full album performances, including the Beach Boys' Pet Sounds (1966) and Wilson's 2004 arrangement of Smile, as well as his That Lucky Old Sun (2008), and Brian Wilson Reimagines Gershwin (2010). Several members merged with the Beach Boys' supporting band during their 2012 reunion, after which Al Jardine joined as a permanent member of Wilson's band.

Wilson retired from live performances in 2022. With his approval, Jardine reformed the group in 2025 under its current name; Wilson died three weeks before the band's return performance and subsequent tour of The Beach Boys Love You (1977). Their current lineup includes original members Sahanaja, D'Amico, Bob Lizik, and Paul von Mertens.

== History ==
=== Formation and Live at the Roxy (1998–2000) ===
Brian Wilson of the Beach Boys had largely avoided touring for most of his career, and his third solo album, Imagination (1998), prompted plans for his first proper solo tour. In late 1998, Wilson's wife Melinda approached the management of Wondermints, a local power pop group formed in the early 1990s by guitarist Nick Walusko and keyboardist Darian Sahanaja. The Wondermints had come to Wilson's attention through a tribute concert in Hollywood and subsequent informal meetings. Two additional Wondermints members were recruited: percussionist Mike D'Amico and multi-instrumentalist Probyn Gregory.

The Wondermints were joined by Chicago-based musicians Scott Bennett (various instruments), Paul Von Mertens (woodwinds), Bob Lizik (bass), and vocalist Taylor Mills, all of whom had worked with Wilson on the Imagination sessions. Former Beach Boys touring musician Jeffrey Foskett, who had toured and recorded with the group since the early 1980s, joined as lead vocalist alongside Sahanaja, who served as musical director. Foskett also served as musical co-director throughout his time with the band.

I feel much more comfortable on stage now. I have a good band behind me. It's a much better band than the Beach Boys were.

— Brian Wilson, 2000

The band's first shows took place in March 1999, with the opening run also featuring Imagination co-producer Joe Thomas on keyboards, and Wondermints. Chicago radio personality Steve Dahl, and drummer Todd Sucherman also appeared on early dates. Sucherman, who had become a full-time member of Styx in 1996, was subsequently replaced on drums by Jim Hines, a Chicago session musician who stayed with Wilson until 2008. Wilson toured the U.S. again in October 1999 and the setlist was soon expanded to a deeper range of his catalog. His first live album, Live at the Roxy Theatre, was recorded at the Roxy Theatre in West Hollywood across two nights in April 2000 and was released later that year.

=== First Pet Sounds and Smile performances (2000–2006) ===
In the summer of 2000, the band performed the complete Pet Sounds album live for the first time on tour. Backing was provided by "local symphonies" at each venue. Although critics praised the tour, it was poorly attended and resulted in hundreds of thousands of dollars in losses. In 2001, Wilson co-headlined a North American amphitheatre tour with Paul Simon. Wilson's band lineup at that time consisted of Foskett, Sahanaja, Gregory, D'Amico, Bennett, Walusko, Mertens, Hines, Lizik, and Mills. In 2002, Wilson and his band toured England and Europe, where they again performed the full Pet Sounds album. Recordings from a set of performances at London's Royal Festival Hall were released as Brian Wilson Presents Pet Sounds Live.

The ensemble developed a reputation for closely replicating Wilson's studio recordings. (Note: Probyn Gregory described the challenge of sourcing a bicycle horn tuned to the correct pitch for a passage in "You Still Believe in Me" as emblematic of the group's approach — Gregory ultimately modified a horn using half a clothespin to flatten the pitch to the required C#, drawing on his classical French horn training.) D'Amico transitioned from drums to percussion and guitar alongside vocalist Taylor Mills. D'Amico took a hiatus year in 2001 to spend more time with his family, during which Wilson's collaborator Andy Paley served in his place as percussionist and vocalist. The Pet Sounds tour was followed by one in Europe in 2002, with a sold-out four-night residency at the Royal Festival Hall in London.

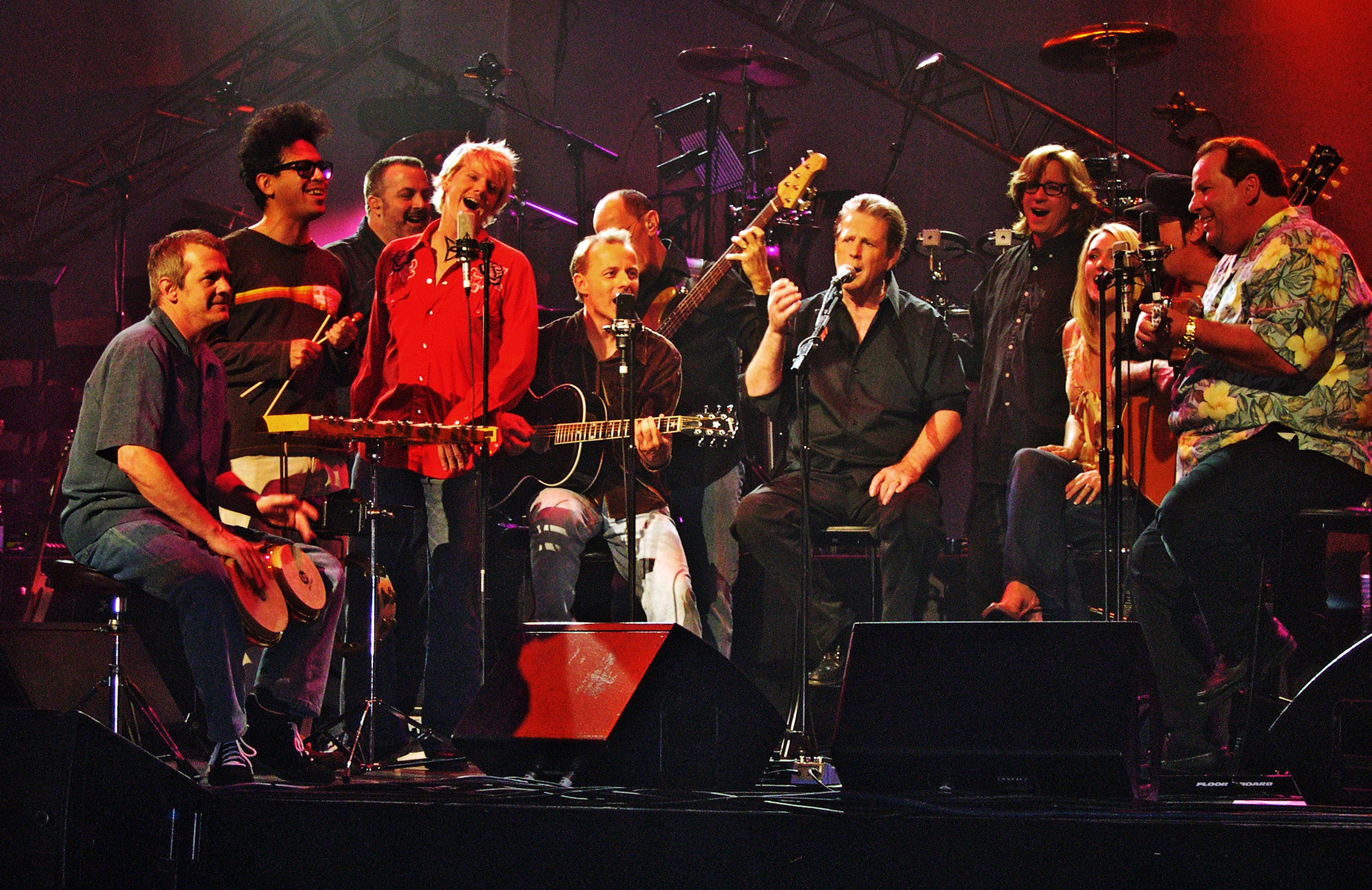
The Brian Wilson Band performing the pre-Smile acoustic set at the Royal Festival Hall, February 21, 2004. From left: Jim Hines, Darian Sahanaja, Paul Mertens, Scott Bennett, Probyn Gregory, Bob Lizik (obscured), Wilson, Nelson Bragg, Taylor Mills, Nick Walusko (obscured), and Jeffrey Foskett.

In 2004, Wilson and his band premiered Brian Wilson Presents Smile (BWPS) at the Royal Festival Hall, completing the album Wilson had abandoned in 1967. The performance was met with widespread critical acclaim and Wilson subsequently embarked on a tour covering the U.S., Europe, and Japan. D'Amico was unavailable to tour in 2004 when rehearsals began; in his place, Sahanaja and Foskett recruited Nelson Bragg, a Los Angeles-based drummer and vocalist who had come to their attention through the local club scene. Sahanaja told Australian Musician, "In six years of touring this is the happiest we've ever seen Brian".

In July 2005, Wilson performed at the Live 8 in Berlin, an event watched by about three million viewers on television. To celebrate the 40th anniversary of Pet Sounds, he toured the album briefly in November 2006 with Al Jardine.

=== That Lucky Old Sun and Brian Wilson Reimagines Gershwin (2007–2011) ===
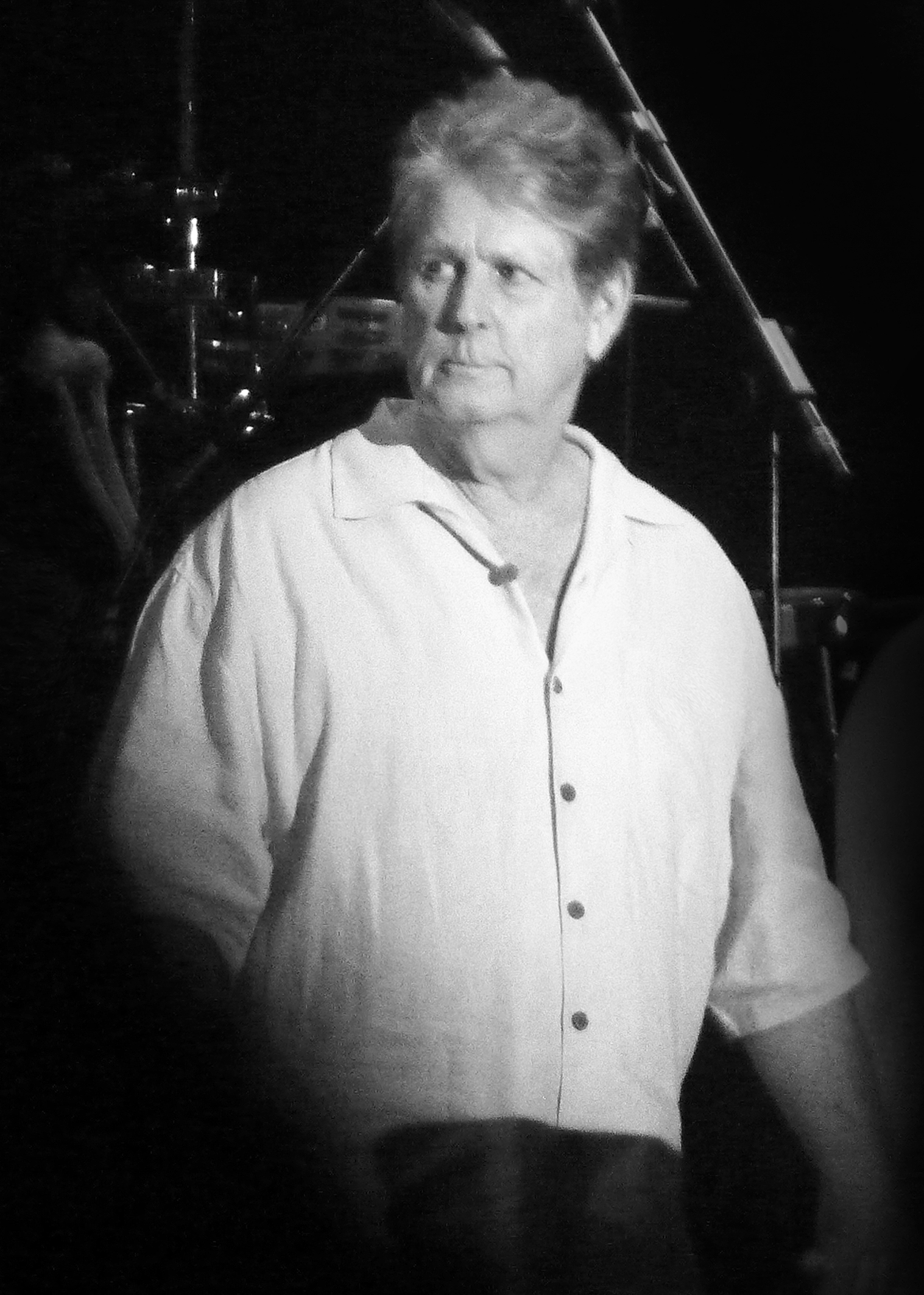
Wilson onstage after performing a concert in England (2009)

In 2007, Wilson and the band were commissioned by the Southbank Centre to create a new work for the reopening of the Royal Festival Hall in London. The resulting song cycle, That Lucky Old Sun, was written by Wilson in collaboration with Bennett, with spoken-word narrative passages written by Van Dyke Parks. Wilson and the band recorded a studio version of the album, which was released in 2008. The band was credited collectively on the release as "That Lucky Old Band".

Around this period, bassist Bob Lizik departed the touring lineup; he was replaced by Brett Simons, who performed with the band and contributed to the recording of That Lucky Old Sun before Lizik returned after 2012. Mike D'Amico also returned, taking over drums from Jim Hines.

In 2010, Wilson released Brian Wilson Reimagines Gershwin. The album's orchestrations and arrangements were developed by Wilson in collaboration with Mertens, while Bennett co-wrote lyrics for two tracks completed from unfinished Gershwin fragments: "The Like in I Love You" and "Nothing But Love". Wilson and the band toured the album in 2011, performing the record in its entirety. The tour comprised 35 dates across North America and Europe, including a return engagement at the Royal Festival Hall in London in September.

Mills departed the touring lineup that year. Asked in a 2015 interview if Wilson had been reaching the end of his career as a performing artist, Sahanaja responded, "I gotta be honest. Each of the past five years I thought to myself, 'Well, this is probably going to be it.'"

=== Post-Beach Boys reunion tour (2012–2022) ===
In 2012, the original surviving members of The Beach Boys: Wilson, Jardine, Mike Love, Bruce Johnston, and David Marks, reunited for the 50th Anniversary Tour. Most of Wilson's touring band formed the backbone of the reunion ensemble, with Sahanaja, Foskett, Bennett, Bragg, D'Amico (playing bass), Gregory, and Mertens all performing alongside the original members, joined by Love and Johnston's touring members. The tour ran from April 24 through September 28, 2012, before the reunion dissolved amid reported disagreements, with Love announcing that Wilson, Jardine, and Marks would no longer be part of the group going forward.

Following the dissolution of the reunion, Wilson resumed solo touring in 2013. Wilson's band undertook an 18-date co-headlining fall tour with guitarist Jeff Beck. Former Beach Boy Blondie Chaplin also played with the band on several tour dates. Jardine rejoined as a permanent touring member in 2014. Foskett's final show with Wilson took place on January 20, at an acoustic event at the Gibson Showroom in Hollywood; he later said he left due to burnout from years of constant touring, although he would later return to the stage as a part of Love's Beach Boys group. Jardine's son, Matt Jardine, assumed a permanent vocal role from 2014, singing falsetto parts that Foskett previously covered. Brian Eichenberger filled in and joined Matt on falsetto vocals for a brief stint from September 2014-January 2015.

The band performing at the Davies Symphony Hall in San Francisco, California (September 2015).

Wilson's tenth solo album, No Pier Pressure, was released on April 7, 2015. Wilson toured in the summer of 2015 to promote it, along with Jardine and Chaplin, who both made appearances on the album. Chaplin continued to tour with the band until Wilson's final show in 2022.

Bennett had been arrested in December 2014 following a sexual assault incident at the Hard Rock Hotel & Casino near Tulsa, Oklahoma; he was subsequently convicted of rape by instrumentation and sexual battery in April 2016 and sentenced to five years in prison. He was not involved in Wilson's subsequent touring. Gary Griffin, who had a long prior association with the Beach Boys, joined Wilson's band in 2016.

The 50th anniversary of Pet Sounds in 2016 prompted another major international tour performing the album in full. Billy Hinsche and Debbie Shair substituted on keyboards for Sahanaja during various parts of the tour. Performances of the album in full would continue through 2019. Rob Bonfiglio, Wilson's son-in-law, joined as an additional lead guitarist and vocalist filling in for Matt in late 2018, for when the band did a brief tour performing The Beach Boys' Christmas Album in full. Percussionist Jim Laspesa also replaced Bragg in the touring lineup that year.

In 2019, Wilson embarked on a co-headlining tour with the Zombies, performing selections from the Beach Boys albums Friends (1968) and Surf's Up (1971). Some concert dates were postponed due to his worsening mental health issues. Nick Walusko died on August 7, hours before a show in Buffalo, New York. The band placed flowers on Walusko's guitars and amps in his usual spot onstage in tribute during their performance that night. Wilson continued to tour before and after the COVID-19 pandemic for his Greatest Hits Live! tours. His final performance took place on July 26, 2022, at Pine Knob Music Theatre in Clarkston, Michigan, the closing date of a co-headline tour with Chicago. In 2024, his family announced he had been diagnosed with dementia and was placed under conservatorship.

=== Reformation (2025–present) ===
In August 2024, Jardine reported that, with Wilson's permission for the use of his band and name, he was planning a tour with many of the musicians from the Brian Wilson Band, minus Wilson himself. He later renamed it the Pet Sounds Band at the suggestion of his son Matt. On April 17, 2025, Jardine announced that the band would tour in July, August, and September. Sahanaja returned as musical director, accompanied by Matt, Lizik, D'Amico, Laspesa, Griffin, Bonfiglio, Mertens, and new members Debbie Shair (keyboards/backing vocals) and Emeen Zarookian (guitar/keyboards/backing vocals). Longtime Beach Boys associate guitarist Randell Kirsch substituted for either Zarookian or Bonfiglio at select shows, while Brendan Carniaux substituted for Mertens at select shows. Lead vocal duties across the band's shows were shared among Al, Matt, Sahanaja, Griffin, Bonfiglio, and Laspesa. Although Wilson was no longer capable of substantial stage appearances, Jardine had initially hoped that he could have made a guest appearance at one of the band's California shows; Wilson died on June 11, before the tour began.

Jardine had desired for the band to honor Wilson's catalogue and introduce lesser known material to the group's setlists. This included a large sampling of songs from the albums 15 Big Ones (1976), The Beach Boys Love You (1977), and M.I.U. Album (1978). After the band's return performance at the Mystic Amphitheater at Mystic Lake Casino in Prior Lake, Minnesota on July 4, they added eleven songs from Love You into their setlists. Most of the songs had not previously been performed live by any members of the Beach Boys. On February 27, 2026, the band performed the Love You album in full for the first time ever at the United Theater on Broadway in Los Angeles. Marilyn Wilson-Rutherford, who sang the duet "Let's Put Our Hearts Together" with Brian on the original recording, joined the band onstage for the song's live debut.

The band returned to Australia for six shows in June and July 2026, which were dates originally scheduled for October and November 2025 before being moved due to scheduling conflicts. To celebrate the 60th anniversary of Pet Sounds, Jardine and the band performed nine songs from the album along with cuts from Love You and hits at these shows. On October 11, 2026, in Cerritos, California, Jardine and the band were joined by Marks, Johnston, Dean Torrence, Marilyn, and Carnie Wilson. This show marked the first appearance by Johnston with the band following his departure from the Beach Boys earlier that year, and the first time he shared the stage with Jardine since 2014. The October 22 show in Northridge, California, also saw guest appearances by Marks, Stephen Kalinich, Wendy Wilson, and Probyn Gregory, who had not joined the reformation band due to his touring committments with "Weird Al" Yankovic.

== Members ==
=== Current members ===
Bold denotes Beach Boys members

- Darian Sahanaja – keyboards, lead and backing vocals, musical direction (1999–2022, 2025–present)
- Paul Von Mertens – woodwinds, horns, backing vocals, musical direction (1999–2022, 2025–present)
- Bob Lizik – bass (1999–2007, 2013-2022, 2025–present)
- Mike D'Amico – drums (2008–2022, 2025–present), percussion, guitar, backing vocals (1999–2001, 2002–2004)
- **Al Jardine** – lead and backing vocals, rhythm guitar (2006–2007, 2013–2022, 2025–present)
- Matt Jardine – lead and backing vocals, acoustic guitar, percussion (2014–2022, 2025–present)
- Gary Griffin – keyboards, backing and lead vocals (2015–2022, 2025–present; substitute 2002-2003, 2007-2009)
- Jim Laspesa – percussion, backing and lead vocals (2018–2022, 2025–present; substitute 2016-2018)
- Rob Bonfiglio – guitar, backing and lead vocals (2018–2022, 2025–present)
- Debbie Shair – keyboards, backing vocals, electro-theremin (2025–present; substitute 2016, 2017)
- Emeen Zarookian – guitar, keyboards, backing vocals (2025–present)
- Randell Kirsch – guitar, backing vocals (2019-2022; 2025–present; as substitute)
- Brendan Carniaux – woodwinds, horns (2025-present; as substitute)

=== Former members ===
Bold denotes Beach Boys members

- **Brian Wilson** – lead and backing vocals, keyboards, piano, bass (1999–2022; died 2025)
- Probyn Gregory – rhythm guitar, trumpet, banjo, bass (1999–2022; guest 2026)
- Nick Walusko – lead guitar, vocals (1999–2019; his death)
- Scott Bennett – keyboards, vocals, percussion (1999–2015)
- Jeff Foskett – lead and backing vocals, rhythm guitar, percussion, musical direction (1999–2014; died 2023)
- Taylor Mills – backing vocals, percussion (1999-2011)
- Joe Thomas – keyboards, backing vocals, acoustic guitar (1999; died 2024)
- Todd Sucherman – drums (1999)
- Steve Dahl – backing vocals, rhythm guitar (1999)
- Jim Hines – drums (1999–2008)
- Andy Paley – percussion (2001–2002; died 2024)
- Nelson Bragg – percussion, vocals (2004–2018)
- Brett Simons – bass (2007–2012)
- Billy Hinsche – keyboards (substitute, 2007–2009; guest 2016; died 2021)
- Brian Eichenberger – lead and backing vocals, acoustic guitar, percussion (2014-2015)
- **David Marks** – lead and backing vocals, lead and rhythm guitar (2013–2014; guest 2026)
- **Blondie Chaplin** – lead and backing vocals, lead and rhythm guitar (2013–2014; 2015–2022)

== Discography ==
Live albums

- Live at the Roxy Theatre (2000)
- Brian Wilson Presents Pet Sounds Live (2002)
- Brian Wilson and Friends (2016)
- On Tour 1999-2007 (2026)

== Sources ==
- Badman, Keith (2004). The Beach Boys: The Definitive Diary of America's Greatest Band, on Stage and in the Studio. Backbeat Books. ISBN 978-0-87930-818-6.
- Carlin, Peter Ames (2006). Catch a Wave: The Rise, Fall, and Redemption of the Beach Boys' Brian Wilson. Rodale. ISBN 978-1-59486-320-2.
- Dillon, Mark (2012). Fifty Sides of the Beach Boys: The Songs That Tell Their Story. ECW Press. ISBN 978-1-77090-198-8.
- Granata, Charles L. (2003). Wouldn't It Be Nice: Brian Wilson and the Making of the Beach Boys' Pet Sounds. A Cappella Books. ISBN 9781556525070.
- Priore, Domenic (2005). Smile: The Story of Brian Wilson's Lost Masterpiece. London: Sanctuary. ISBN 1860746276.
