= Don't Fight the Sea =

Canadian song

"Don't Fight the Sea" is a song written by Terry Jacks and released as a single in 1976, reaching #31 on the Canadian Charts.

== Al Jardine version ==
"Don't Fight the Sea"

Single by Al Jardine featuring the Beach Boys

from the album A Postcard from California
- B-side: "Friends" (acapella)
- Released: April 16, 2011
- Recorded: 1978–2010
- Genre: Rock
- Length: 3:24
- Label: Capitol Records
- Songwriter(s): Terry Jacks; Al Jardine

Al Jardine singles chronology
"PT Cruiser" (2002)	"Don't Fight the Sea" (2011)

The Beach Boys singles chronology
"Good Vibrations" (2011)	"Don't Fight the Sea" (2011)	"That's Why God Made the Radio" (2012)

The song was attempted by the Beach Boys in 1976 during recording sessions for their album 15 Big Ones. In 2010, the song was rewritten with Al Jardine for his album A Postcard from California and with several of his Beach Boys bandmates making a guest appearance, with vocals culled from various recording sessions during the interim period. Jardine's version was also issued on a 7" vinyl record on April 16, 2011 for Record Store Day 2011 in a limited edition of 2,500 copies (1,000 white vinyl and 1,500 black vinyl) with the proceeds to benefit tsunami relief for Japan.

=== Personnel ===
The Beach Boys

- Al Jardine – lead and backing vocals, keyboards
- Carl Wilson – lead and backing vocals
- Brian Wilson – backing vocals
- Mike Love – backing vocals
- Bruce Johnston – backing vocals

Additional musicians

- Matt Jardine – backing vocals
- Ed Carter – guitars, bass
- Michael Lent – guitars
- Scott Mathews – backing vocals, guitars
- Mike Meros – keyboards
- Bobby Figueroa – drums
