= Matt Jardine =

American musician (born 1966)

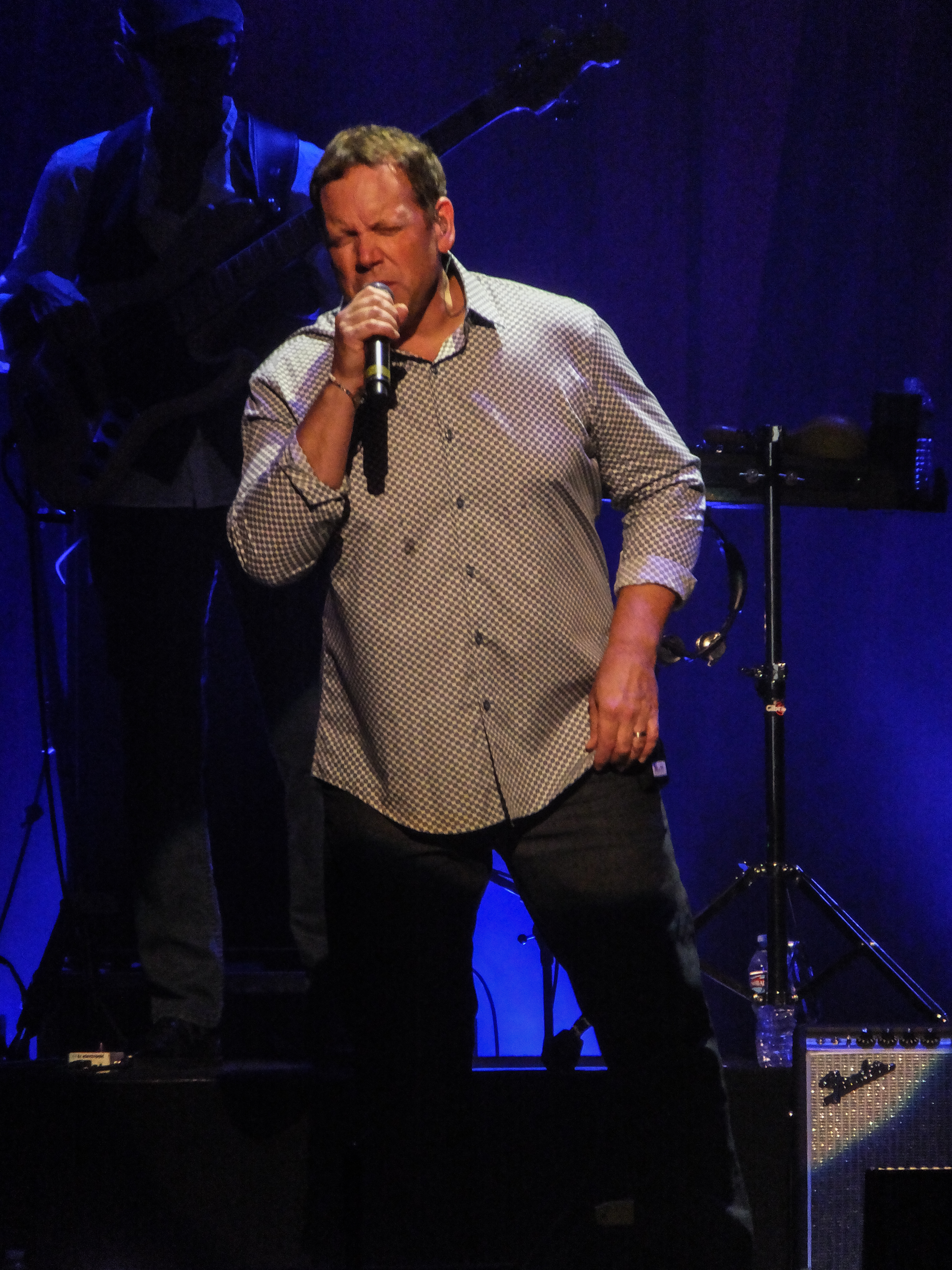

Background information
- Born: Matthew Alan Jardine; December 9, 1966 (age 59); Big Sur, California, U.S.
- Genres: Pop rock; rock and roll; surf rock; psychedelic rock
- Occupation: Musician
- Instruments: Vocals; percussion; guitar
- Member of: Pet Sounds Band
- Formerly of: The Beach Boys touring band; California Saga; California Music

Matthew Alan Jardine (born December 9, 1966) is an American musician, best known for his work as a vocalist and percussionist for the Beach Boys and the Pet Sounds Band. He is the son of original Beach Boy Al Jardine.

== Biography ==
Jardine is the son of longtime, and original Beach Boys guitarist Al Jardine. His first major recording was at the age of 11 and was the narration of the Beach Boys' recording of "(I Saw Santa) Rockin' Around The Christmas Tree" from the unreleased album Merry Christmas from the Beach Boys. Jardine, alongside the other Beach Boys' children (the "Adam" referred to in the narration was his younger brother, Adam Jardine, age six), sang the background vocals on this song.

During the 1980s, Jardine spent time on the road with the Beach Boys as a gofer to earn money. This led to an assistant road manager job in the summer of 1988, which he retained until Carl Wilson asked if he could play percussion onstage while continuing his other duties. During this tour Jardine was asked to sing background vocals on a part-time basis filling in for other vocalists in the band, whose voices had grown tired due to the band's year-round touring schedule.

In 1991, Jardine auditioned for the band and earned a spot in the band as a lead and falsetto vocalist, background singer and percussionist. He toured with the Beach Boys from 1990 through 1998, performing on three of their studio albums. Jardine sang Brian Wilson's original falsetto vocals on tour; these songs included "Warmth of the Sun", "Don't Worry Baby", and "Hushabye". He has appeared in nine Beach Boys' music videos and made numerous TV appearances. During the latter part of his time with the Beach Boys, Jardine also worked extensively with Mike Love's California Beach Band. He also toured with Jan and Dean for numerous shows and events.

After Carl Wilson died on February 6, 1998, Jardine's father Al quit the Beach Boys and began performing a series of solo shows, and Jardine accompanied him on background vocals. During this time, Jardine was asked to perform with Brian Wilson on TNT's Front Row and Center as well as Farm Aid '98. Wilson was quoted as saying of Jardine in Billboard magazine, "I hear him from behind the stage. His voice is stronger than mine, and he can actually hit those high notes."

Jardine later went on the road with Wilson's daughters Carnie and Wendy Wilson and friend Chynna Phillips, the multi-platinum trio Wilson Phillips, to help them promote their California album. Carnie and Wendy not only were childhood friends but also had worked with Jardine and his father while touring as Alan Jardine's Family and Friends following their departure from the Beach Boys touring band in 1998. Jardine continued to tour with his father and the Surf City All-Stars. On June 2 and 3, 2012, during the Beach Boys' 50th anniversary tour, Jardine, his brother Adam, Carnie and Wendy Wilson, and the children of Mike Love, Carl and Dennis Wilson opened for the band as an eight-piece group called California Saga. In 2014, Jardine was asked to join the Brian Wilson Band, replacing Jeff Foskett; he accepted. He performed alongside his father and Wilson at most subsequent shows until Wilson's final show on July 26, 2022. In 2021, Jardine participated with his father as well as Love, David Marks and Bruce Johnston in a reconstituted line-up of California Music, providing backing vocals on a re-recorded version of the Beach Boys' song "Add Some Music to Your Day".

In August 2024, Al reported that, with Wilson's permission for the use of his band and name, he was planning a tour with many of the musicians from the Brian Wilson Band, minus Wilson himself. Jardine was inducted into the reunited line-up, and suggested that his father rename the band to the Pet Sounds Band. The band began touring in July 2025, shortly after Wilson's death on June 11.

== Discography ==
=== The Beach Boys ===
- M.I.U. Album (1978)
- ”Come Go With Me” (single) (1981)
- Still Cruisin' (1989)
- Summer in Paradise (1992)
- Stars and Stripes Vol. 1 (1996)
- Ultimate Christmas (1998)
- Songs from Here & Back (2006)
- ”Don’t Fight the Sea” (single) (credited to Al Jardine with The Beach Boys) (2011)

=== Al Jardine ===
- Live in Las Vegas (2001)
- A Postcard from California (2010)

=== Brian Wilson ===
- No Pier Pressure (2015)
