= Gary Griffin (musician) =

American musician (born 1951)

- Born: October 26, 1951 (age 74); Cincinnati, Ohio, U.S.
- Occupation: musician
- Instruments: Keyboard, vocals
- Years active: 1977–present

Gary Griffin (born October 26, 1951, in Cincinnati, Ohio) is an American musician, best known for performing as a keyboardist and vocalist with The Beach Boys, Brian Wilson, Jan and Dean and The Surf City Allstars.

== Early career ==
Griffin grew up in Cincinnati and attended Miami University and the University of Cincinnati – College-Conservatory of Music, where he majored in piano and music theory.

In 1977, Griffin moved to Los Angeles where he was hired as an organist by The Beach Boys, joining them for the recording of their Warner Brothers album M.I.U., as well as several other related productions, Almost Summer by spin-off group Celebration and Weavings by jazz saxophonist Charles Lloyd.

Griffin toured and recorded with Jan and Dean throughout the 1980s and 1990s, and has appeared as a regular on several television shows, most notably General Hospital and Full House. In 2000, Griffin served as music director, alongside producer John Stamos, for the Emmy-nominated television mini-series, The Beach Boys: An American Family for ABC. He also appeared as a recording engineer and bass guitarist in the film.

Griffin has produced an eclectic roster of artists, most notably Micky Dolenz of The Monkees, political satirist Harry Shearer., Dave Coulier, singer Sandra Stephens, Laura Hall of television's, "Whose Line Is It Anyway?" and long time The Beach Boys band member Jeffrey Foskett. He also co-produced the music for the PBS television series, “Edens: Lost and Found”, “And Thou Shalt Honor” and "Designing Healthy Communities".

In 2008, Griffin was featured prominently in the best-selling book, When We Get To Surf City, by Bob Greene, an account of life on the road with the Jan and Dean band in the 90's. He has continued to work with various members of The Beach Boys, most recently as a keyboardist and engineer for their 50th anniversary CD, That's Why God Made the Radio.

== Later career ==
Griffin has toured and recorded with Brian Wilson in recent years, contributing to his CD's That Lucky Old Sun, Brian Wilson Reimagines Gershwin and In the Key of Disney.

Additionally, Griffin performs with The Surf City Allstars He co-produced their CD's Acoustic Vibrations and Live with the band's drummer, David Logeman. He is also Music Director and sings and plays keyboard for The Tribe, a revolving group of Los Angeles musicians and singers that includes Stephen John Kalinich, Freebo, Fuzzbee Morse, Gary Stockdale, Grant Geissman, Carly Smithson, Rosemary Butler, Marc Mann, The Honeys, and Band Manager Lauri Reimer.

In July 2013, he appeared with John Stamos on Late Night with Jimmy Fallon at the host's request. He performed as part of a reunion of Jesse and the Rippers, the fictitious band from Full House.

Griffin has engineered several recent recordings by legendary pop music notables, such as Petula Clark, Jimmy Webb, Christopher Cross, Al Kooper, Rod McKuen and Mark Lindsay.

Recent productions include The Bamboo Trading Company (2013)— a group consisting of surf music cohorts Randell Kirsch, Phil Bardowell, Matt Jardine and Dean Torrence— and Keep a Little Christmas (2014), which is his third CD collaboration with singer Nita Whitaker.

Griffin appears as session musician, Al DeLory in the Brian Wilson biopic, "Love and Mercy (film)", starring John Cusack, Paul Giamatti and Paul Dano, released in the summer of 2015.

In the summer of 2015, he was a featured performer and bandleader in The Beach Boys Tribute, a fundraiser for the City of Hope by the Get Together Foundation. He also reprised those duties for Rock and Roll Christmas later that year, a fundraiser for MusiCares. In February, 2016, Gary (and The Rippers) appeared in the premiere episode of the Netflix series, Fuller House, the sequel to Full House.

Since 2016, Griffin has been touring extensively with Brian Wilson, singing and playing keyboards, vibes and percussion. Highlights have included the 2016/17 Pet Sounds 50th Anniversary World Tours, the 2018 Christmas show and concerts featuring music from the Beach Boys’ Friends and Surf’s Up albums as well as Brian’s greatest hits.

In 2017, Vivid Sound Corporation in Japan released Griffin's first solo CD, Sympathetic Vibrations. Featured performers include Nita Whitaker, Jeffrey Foskett, Sandra Stephens, Carol Kaye, Tony Sciuto and Alan Boyd.

== Family ==
Gary is the son of famed WWII navigator, Tom Griffin, a member of the Doolittle Raiders, and has been married since 2011 to Elizabeth Fogle Griffin.
