= Nelson Bragg =

American drummer

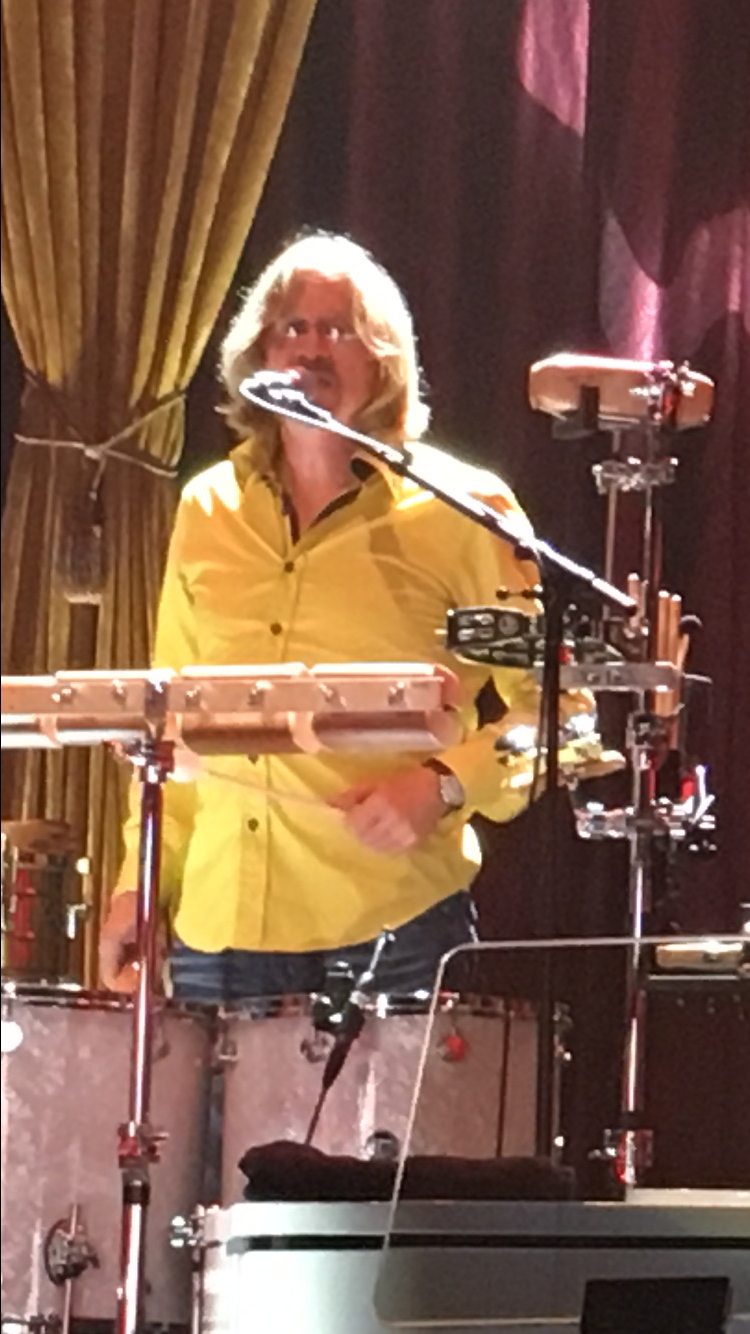
- Nelson Bragg live with Brian Wilson in 2017

Background information
- Born: August 14, 1961 (age 63); Dover, New Hampshire, U.S.
- Genres: Rock, pop
- Occupation(s): Musician, songwriter
- Instruments: Percussion; vocals; drums; guitar
- Years active: 1979 - Present
- Website: www.nelsonbragg.com

Nelson Bragg (born August 14, 1961) is an American percussionist, vocalist and songwriter based in Los Angeles, California.

== Biography ==
Nelson Bragg was born in Dover, New Hampshire on August 14, 1961. He played in several bands from 1979 to 1999, including positions as a pit drummer for more than twenty stage musicals. He later played at the Emerson College theater in Boston, Massachusetts and at the New London Barn Playhouse in New London, New Hampshire.

Bragg's bands include the horn-driven/post-punk dance band Big Noise (1981–1987) based in Woodstock, New York, and Farmhouse (1989–1992), a harmony-based folk rock group based in Northampton, Massachusetts. Bragg moved to Los Angeles in 1999.

== Bands ==
In 2000, Bragg joined several Los Angeles pop bands, including The Now People, The Quarter After, Twenty Cent Crush and Cloud Eleven. In 2001, Bragg joined Stew for his album, titled Naked Dutch Painter, and played subsequent shows promoting the album, which was named Entertainment Weekly's "Album of the Year" for 2002. Bragg also played with pop group The Negro Problem, Stew's former band and alter ego.

In 2003, Bragg joined Brian Wilson's band as a percussionist-vocalist for live performances of Wilson's unreleased album Smile. The February 2004 premiere in London and subsequent tour was followed by a formal recording of "Smile", released in September 2004. "Smile" received multiple nominations for the 2004 Grammy Awards, including Best Pop Vocal Album and Best Engineered Album, Non-Classical (for Mark Linett). The album later won a single Grammy, in the category of Best Rock Instrumental Performance, for the track "Mrs. O'Leary's Cow".

In 2005, the Smile two-DVD set was released, featuring a full-length documentary of Brian Wilson's "Smile" story, and the making of it, both in 1966-1967 and newly again in 2004. The documentary aired on Showtime in October 2004, and was directed by Beach Boys authority David Leaf. A live concert performance of "Smile" is featured on the second disc.

== Tours ==
Bragg's tours included performances at London's Royal Festival Hall, two nights at Carnegie Hall (broadcast on NPR radio, nationally on Thanksgiving Day 2004), two nights at The Sydney Opera House, The Hollywood Bowl, three nights with The Los Angeles Philharmonic in 2008, Royal Albert Hall, The Montreaux Jazz Festival, The New Orleans Jazz Festival, The Newport Folk Fest, Brandenburgh Gate - Berlin for the worldwide Live 8 benefit, and at The 2005 Glastonbury Festival in the United Kingdom.

Bragg has also performed with Brian Wilson's band on several television appearances, including The Tonight Show with Jay Leno and on The Late Show with Conan O'Brien.

Bragg's recordings include Brian Wilson's Christmas album, All I Really Want For Christmas, released in 2005 and That Lucky Old Sun, released in 2008. Between 2006 and 2007, the band performed the Pet Sounds album in the U.S. and Europe, celebrating its 40th anniversary (Beach Boy and Al Jardine joined the band for the U.S. leg of the tour). That Lucky Old Sun was an anticipated album that garnered mixed reviews.

== Albums ==
In 2003, prior to his position with The Brian Wilson Band, Bragg started recording a solo album which was completed and released on Side B Music in 2007. The album features Nick Walusko, fellow Brian Wilson bandmate and Wondermint Mike Randle, guitarist with Baby Lemonade and longtime member of Love with Arthur Lee Morley Bartnoff, keyboardist with Burning Sensations and currently member of Dramarama Rob Campanella, organist-guitarist with The Brian Jonestown Massacre and The Quarter After, Probyn Gregory, fellow Brian Wilson bandmate and Wondermint, Severo Jornacion, bassist with The Smithereens and Debbie Shair, keyboardist with Heart. The album also features the Stockholm String Ensemble on seven of its twelve tracks. Bragg performed all acoustics, vocals, drums and percussion among other instruments on the record. The record is influenced by CSNY, George Harrison, The Byrds, The dB's, and Canada's The Grapes Of Wrath, and was produced by L.A. pop-garage producer Steve Refling. As of 2012, Bragg completed his second solo record entitled We Get What We Want. Bragg's 3rd and final solo album "Gratitude Blues" was released on September 30, 2021. It too was produced with Steve Refling.

== Other projects ==
=== Performances ===
Bragg has been involved with many bands throughout his time as a professional percussionist. He has recorded albums with the Now People, The Quarter After, Cloud Eleven, The Mello Cads, Keven Kane (The Grapes Of Wrath), Andrew Sandoval and most notably The Mockers. Bragg has also garnered three tours of Spain with The Mockers in 2002, 2005 and 2007. 2008 brought Bragg back to Carnegie Hall as the house percussionist for Sting and Trudy's annual rainforest benefit.

In 2009, Bragg produced the album "Tangle Free World" for singer/songwriter Anny Celsi. Bragg also toured the UK and Europe with Celsi in 2009, 2010 and 2011, where the duo was augmented by guest musicians including Roland Wolff, Duncan Maitland, Richard Snow, and Nico J Wouters.

=== Records and albums ===
Bragg is the drummer-percussionist and harmony vocalist on several dozen records, but his most well-known recording other than "Smile" came in 2006, on the In My Room CD tribute to Brian Wilson, included with Mojo magazine's January 2007 issue. Bragg sang lead and drummed on The Mockers Beatlesque version of "God Only Knows." That recording was the largest exposure of Bragg's lead vocal to date with a pressing of over 200,000 copies worldwide. In the Spring of 2007, Bragg embarked on a 30-date tour of Europe and the U.S. with Brian Wilson and Al Jardine from The Beach Boys. The tour included a premiere in London of Wilson's new work That Lucky Old Sun. That Lucky Old Sun.

In 2009, Bragg completed work on his first musical production with singer-songwriter Anny Celsi. "Tangle-Free World" garnered three tours of Europe in 2009, 2010, and 2011, respectively.

In 2010, Bragg embarked on two album tours with Brian Wilson for the Disney-Pearl label; Brian Wilson Re-imagines Gershwin and an album of Disney songs were released in 2010 and 2011, respectively. Bragg was the percussionist on both records and also contributed some vocals to the set. "The Re-imagines" Gershwin record garnered The Brian Wilson Band an elaborate tour of North America and Wilson's first-ever complete tour of Canada.

== Beach Boys 50th Anniversary tour ==
Bragg participated in The Beach Boys 50th Anniversary Reunion Tour as the band's percussionist. John Voket wrote in his review that "...percussionist Nelson Bragg was amazing to watch as he deftly handled some of the unique hand instruments that flavored so many Beach Boys numbers while simultaneously contributing backing vocals to almost every tune." Greg Kot, a Chicago Tribune music critic, also positively reviewed Bragg's performance.
