= Mike Meros =

American musician

Michael Meros (September 29, 1950 – December 26, 2007) was an American keyboardist best known as a member of the Beach Boys touring band from 1979 until July 4, 2001.

Meros hailed from the Brooklyn Park neighborhood of Baltimore, Maryland. His entire family was musical and comprised a band known as the "Meros Brothers". Mike played in other bands as well, including Shelley's Emeralds, the Bare Essentials, The Ravens and the New Apocalypse.

Meros earned a degree in Music from the University of Maryland in 1972.

== Death ==
Meros died unexpectedly of a heart attack on December 26, 2007. He had been performing as recently as July 2007 with Al Jardine.
