= List of songs covered by the Beach Boys =

Cover versions recorded and released by the Beach Boys, as a band and as solo artists, include:

== The Beach Boys ==
Song	Year	Beach Boys album	Original artist	Note(s)
"Little Girl (You're My Miss America)"	1962	Surfin' Safari	Dante & His Friends	
"Summertime Blues"	1962	Surfin' Safari	Eddie Cochran	
"Moon Dawg"	1962	Surfin' Safari	The Gamblers	
"Misirlou"	1963	Surfin' U.S.A.	Dick Dale	
"Honky Tonk"	1963	Surfin' U.S.A.	Bill Doggett	
"Let's Go Trippin'	1963	Surfin' U.S.A.	Dick Dale	(Note: An additional version appears on Beach Boys Concert.)
"Old Folks at Home"	1963	Surfer Girl	standard, written by Stephen Foster	(Note: As "South Bay Surfer (The Old Folks at Home)" with additional lyrics by Brian Wilson, Carl Wilson, and Al Jardine.)
"Their Hearts Were Full of Spring"	1964	Little Deuce Coupe	The Four Freshmen	(Note: As "A Young Man is Gone" with new lyrics by Mike Love.)
"Why Do Fools Fall in Love?"	1964	Shut Down Volume 2	Frankie Lymon & the Teenagers	
"Louie Louie"	1964	Shut Down Volume 2	The Kingsmen	
"Hushabye"	1964	All Summer Long	The Mystics	
"The Little Old Lady from Pasadena"	1964	Beach Boys Concert	Jan and Dean	
"Long, Tall Texan"	1964	Beach Boys Concert	Murry Kellum	
"Monster Mash"	1964	Beach Boys Concert	Bobby (Boris) Pickett and the Crypt-Kickers	
"Papa-Oom-Mow-Mow"	1964	Beach Boys Concert	The Rivingtons	(Note: An additional version appears on Beach Boys' Party!.)
"The Wanderer"	1964	Beach Boys Concert	Dion	
"Graduation Day"	1964	Beach Boys Concert	The Four Freshmen	
"Johnny B. Goode"	1964	Beach Boys Concert	Chuck Berry	
"Frosty the Snowman"	1964	The Beach Boys' Christmas Album	Gene Autry and the Cass County Boys	
"We Three Kings of Orient Are"	1964	The Beach Boys' Christmas Album	standard, written by John Henry Hopkins, Jr.	
"Blue Christmas"	1964	The Beach Boys' Christmas Album	Doye O'Dell	
"Santa Claus Is Comin' to Town"	1964	The Beach Boys' Christmas Album	Harry Reser	
"White Christmas"	1964	The Beach Boys' Christmas Album	Bing Crosby	
"I'll Be Home for Christmas"	1964	The Beach Boys' Christmas Album	Bing Crosby	
"Auld Lang Syne"	1964	The Beach Boys' Christmas Album	traditional	
"Do You Want to Dance"	1965	The Beach Boys Today!	Bobby Freeman	(Note: As "Do You Wanna Dance?".)
"I'm So Young"	1965	The Beach Boys Today!	The Students	
"Then He Kissed Me"	1965	Summer Days (And Summer Nights!!)	The Crystals	(Note: As "Then I Kissed Her".)
"Hully Gully"	1965	Beach Boys' Party!	The Olympics	
"I Should Have Known Better"	1965	Beach Boys' Party!	The Beatles	
"Tell Me Why"	1965	Beach Boys' Party!	The Beatles	
"Mountain of Love"	1965	Beach Boys' Party!	Harold Dorman	
"You've Got to Hide Your Love Away"	1965	Beach Boys' Party!	The Beatles	
"Devoted to You"	1965	Beach Boys' Party!	The Everly Brothers	
"Alley Oop"	1965	Beach Boys' Party!	The Hollywood Argyles	
"There's No Other (Like My Baby)"	1965	Beach Boys' Party!	The Crystals	
"The Times They Are a-Changin'"	1965	Beach Boys' Party!	Bob Dylan	
"Barbara Ann"	1965	Beach Boys' Party!	The Regents	
"Sloop John B"	1966	Pet Sounds	traditional	(Note: Based on the version by the Kingston Trio.)
"I Was Made to Love Her"	1967	Wild Honey	Stevie Wonder	
"Cotton Fields"	1969	20/20	Lead Belly	
"Bluebirds over the Mountain"	1969	20/20	Ersel Hickey	
"I Can Hear Music"	1969	20/20	The Ronettes	
"Here Comes Santa Claus"	1974	"Child of Winter (Christmas Song)" / "Susie Cincinnati"	traditional	(Note: In medley with "Child of Winter (Christmas Song)".)
"Rock and Roll Music"	1976	15 Big Ones	Chuck Berry	
"Chapel of Love"	1976	15 Big Ones	The Dixie Cups	
"Talk to Me"	1976	15 Big Ones	Little Willie John	(Note: As "Talk to Me (Medley)".)
"Tallahassee Lassie"	1976	15 Big Ones	Freddy Cannon	(Note: As "Talk to Me (Medley)".)
"Palisades Park"	1976	15 Big Ones	Freddy Cannon	
"A Casual Look"	1976	15 Big Ones	The Six Teens	
"Blueberry Hill"	1976	15 Big Ones	Fats Domino	
"In the Still of the Night"	1976	15 Big Ones	Five Satins	
"Just Once in My Life"	1976	15 Big Ones	The Righteous Brothers	
"Come Go with Me"	1978	M.I.U. Album	The Del-Vikings	
"Peggy Sue"	1978	M.I.U. Album	Buddy Holly	
"Shortnin' Bread"	1979	L.A. (Light Album)	James Whitcomb Riley	
"School Days"	1980	Keepin' the Summer Alive	Chuck Berry	
"Sea Cruise"	1981	Ten Years of Harmony	Frankie Ford	
"With a Little Help from My Friends"	1983	Rarities	The Beatles	
"The Letter"	1983	Rarities	The Box Tops	
"California Dreamin'"	1986	Made in U.S.A.	The Mamas & the Papas	
"Wipe Out"	1989	Still Cruisin'	The Surfaris	
"Crocodile Rock"	1991	Two Rooms: Celebrating the Songs of Elton John & Bernie Taupin	Elton John	
"Hot Fun in the Summertime"	1992	Summer in Paradise	Sly and the Family Stone	
"Remember (Walking in the Sand)"	1992	Summer in Paradise	The Shangri-Las	
"Under the Boardwalk"	1992	Summer in Paradise	The Drifters	
"Ruby Baby"	1996	Good Vibrations: Thirty Years of The Beach Boys	The Drifters	
"Walk On By"	2001	Friends / 20/20	Dionne Warwick	
"Ol' Man River"	2001	Friends / 20/20	Oscar Hammerstein II	
"You Are So Beautiful"	2002	Good Timin': Live at Knebworth England 1980	Joe Cocker	
"The Old Master Painter"	2011	The Smile Sessions	standard, written by Beasley Smith and Haven Gillespie	
"You Are My Sunshine"	2011	The Smile Sessions	standard, written by Jimmie Davis and Charles Mitchell	
"I Wanna Be Around"	2011	The Smile Sessions	standard, written by Sadie Vimmerstedt and Johnny Mercer	
"Gee"	2011	The Smile Sessions	The Crows	
"Why Don't They Let Us Fall in Love"	2013	Made in California	The Ronettes	
"Da Doo Ron Ron"	2013	Made in California	The Crystals	
"Runaway"	2013	Made in California	Del Shannon	
"You've Lost That Lovin' Feelin'"	2013	Made in California	The Righteous Brothers	
"One Kiss Led to Another"	2015	Beach Boys' Party! Uncovered and Unplugged	The Coasters	
"Laugh at Me"	2015	Beach Boys' Party! Uncovered and Unplugged	Sonny Bono	
"Ticket to Ride"	2015	Beach Boys' Party! Uncovered and Unplugged	The Beatles	
"Blowin' in the Wind"	2015	Beach Boys' Party! Uncovered and Unplugged	Bob Dylan	
"Riot in Cell Block Number 9"	2015	Beach Boys' Party! Uncovered and Unplugged	The Robins	
"(I Can't Get No) Satisfaction"	2015	Beach Boys' Party! Uncovered and Unplugged	The Rolling Stones	
"Smoky Joe's Cafe"	2015	Beach Boys' Party! Uncovered and Unplugged	The Coasters	
"Long Tall Sally"	2015	Beach Boys' Party! Uncovered and Unplugged	Little Richard	
"You've Lost That Lovin' Feelin'"	2015	Beach Boys' Party! Uncovered and Unplugged	The Righteous Brothers	
"Hang On Sloopy"	2015	Beach Boys' Party! Uncovered and Unplugged	The McCoys	
"Twist and Shout"	2015	Beach Boys' Party! Uncovered and Unplugged	The Isley Brothers	
"The Diary"	2015	Beach Boys' Party! Uncovered and Unplugged	Neil Sedaka	
"Heart and Soul"	2015	Beach Boys' Party! Uncovered and Unplugged	Larry Clinton	
"Game of Love"	2017	1967 – Sunshine Tomorrow	Wayne Fontana	
"Good News"	2017	1967 – Sunshine Tomorrow 2: The Studio Sessions	The Kingston Trio	
"My Little Red Book"	2018	Wake the World: The Friends Sessions	Manfred Mann	
"Rock & Roll Woman"	2018	Wake the World: The Friends Sessions	Buffalo Springfield	
"Seasons in the Sun"	2021	Feel Flows	Le Moribond	
"You Never Give Me Your Money"	2021	Feel Flows	The Beatles	
"Gimme Some Lovin'"	2022	Sail On Sailor – 1972	The Spencer Davis Group	
"Battle Hymn of the Republic"	2024	1974 Release	standard, written by Julia Ward Howe	

=== Unreleased ===
Song	Year	Original artist	Note(s)
"How Deep Is the Ocean"	1966	standard, written by Irving Berlin	
"Stella by Starlight"	1966	Victor Young	
"On Top of Old Smoky"	1967	traditional	
"Come to the Sunshine"	1975	Van Dyke Parks	
"Mony Mony"	1976	Tommy James and The Shondells	
"Running Bear"	1976	Johnny Preston	
"Shake Rattle & Roll"	1976	Big Joe Turner	
"Let's Dance"	1976	Chris Montez	
"Working in the Coal Mine"	1976	Lee Dorsey	
"On Broadway"	1977	The Drifters	
"Deep Purple"	1977	Peter DeRose	
"Calendar Girl"	1978	Neil Sedaka	
"Jamaica Farewell"	1979	Harry Belafonte	
"River Deep – Mountain High"	1980	Ike & Tina Turner	
"Be My Baby"	1980	The Ronettes	
"I'm a Man"	1980	The Spencer Davis Group	
"At the Hop"	1985	Danny & The Juniors	

== Solo ==
=== Mike Love ===
Song	Year	Album	Original artist	Note(s)
"On and On and On"	1981	Looking Back With Love	ABBA	
"Over and Over"	1981	Looking Back With Love	Bobby Day	
"Calendar Girl"	1981	Looking Back With Love	Neil Sedaka	
"Be My Baby"	1981	Looking Back With Love	The Ronettes	
"Teach Me Tonight"	1981	Looking Back With Love	Gene De Paul	
"Da Doo Ron Ron"	1983	Rock 'n' Roll City	The Crystals	
"Lightnin' Strikes"	1983	Rock 'n' Roll City	Lou Christie	
"The Letter"	1983	Rock 'n' Roll City	The Box Tops	
"The Loco-Motion"	1983	Rock 'n' Roll City	Little Eva	
"Sugar Shack"	1983	Rock 'n' Roll City	The Fireballs	
"My Boyfriend's Back"	1983	Rock 'n' Roll City	The Angels	(Note: As "Her Boyfriend's Back".)
"Jingle Bell Rock"	1983	Scrooge's Rock 'n' Roll Christmas	Bobby Helms	
"The Little Old Lady From Pasadena"	1998	Salute NASCAR	Jan and Dean	
"Little G.T.O."	1998	Salute NASCAR	Ronny and the Daytonas	
"Hungry Heart"	2002		Bruce Springsteen	
"Finally, It's Christmas"	2018	Reason for the Season	Hanson	
"Must Be Chriatmas"	2018	Reason for the Season	Band of Merrymakers	
"Jingle Bell Rock"	2018	Reason for the Season	Bobby Helms	
"Do You Hear What I Hear"	2018	Reason for the Season	Harry Simeone	
"Away in the Manger"	2018	Reason for the Season		
"Bring a Torch"	2018	Reason for the Season		
"O Come All Ye Faithful"	2018	Reason for the Season		
"O Holy Night"	2018	Reason for the Season		
"California Sun"	2019	12 Sides of Summer	The Rivieras	
"Here Comes the Sun"	2019	12 Sides of Summer	The Beatles	
"The Girl from Ipanema"	2019	12 Sides of Summer	Antônio Carlos Jobim	
"Rockaway Beach"	2019	12 Sides of Summer	The Ramones	

=== Brian Wilson ===
Song	Year	Album	Original artist	Note(s)
"Goodnight, Irene"	1988	Folkways: A Vision Shared	Lead Belly	
"Sweets for My Sweet"	1995	Till the Night Is Gone: A Tribute to Doc Pomus	The Drifters	
"This Could Be the Night"	1995	For the Love of Harry: Everybody Sings Nilsson	Modern Folk Quartet	
"What a Wonderful World"	1995	Orange Crate Art	Bob Thiele, George David Weiss	
"Brian Wilson"	2000	Live at the Roxy Theatre	Barenaked Ladies	
"Be My Baby"	2000	Live at the Roxy Theatre	The Ronettes	
"God Rest Ye Merry Gentlemen"	2005	What I Really Want for Christmas		
"O Holy Night"	2005	What I Really Want for Christmas		
"We Wish You a Merry Christmas"	2005	What I Really Want for Christmas		
"Hark the Herald Angels Sing"	2005	What I Really Want for Christmas		
"It Came Upon a Midnight Clear"	2005	What I Really Want for Christmas		
"The First Noel"	2005	What I Really Want for Christmas		
"Deck the Halls"	2005	What I Really Want for Christmas		
"Joy to the World"	2005	What I Really Want for Christmas		
"Silent Night"	2005	What I Really Want for Christmas		
"That Lucky Old Sun"	2008	That Lucky Old Sun	Frankie Laine	
"I'm Into Something Good"	2008	That Lucky Old Sun	Earl-Jean	
"Rhapsody in Blue/Intro"	2010	Brian Wilson Reimagines Gershwin	George Gershwin	
"Summertime"	2010	Brian Wilson Reimagines Gershwin	George Gershwin	
"I Loves You, Porgy"	2010	Brian Wilson Reimagines Gershwin	George Gershwin	
"I Got Plenty o' Nuttin'"	2010	Brian Wilson Reimagines Gershwin	George Gershwin	
"It Ain't Necessarily So"	2010	Brian Wilson Reimagines Gershwin	George Gershwin	
"'S Wonderful"	2010	Brian Wilson Reimagines Gershwin	George Gershwin	
"They Can't Take That Away from Me"	2010	Brian Wilson Reimagines Gershwin	George Gershwin	
"Love Is Here to Stay"	2010	Brian Wilson Reimagines Gershwin	George Gershwin	
"I've Got a Crush on You"	2010	Brian Wilson Reimagines Gershwin	George Gershwin	
"I Got Rhythm"	2010	Brian Wilson Reimagines Gershwin	George Gershwin	
"Someone to Watch Over Me"	2010	Brian Wilson Reimagines Gershwin	George Gershwin	
"Nothing But Love"	2010	Brian Wilson Reimagines Gershwin	George Gershwin	
"Let's Call the Whole Thing Off"	2010	Brian Wilson Reimagines Gershwin	George Gershwin	
"California Sun"	2010	Curious George 2: Follow That Monkey (Music from the Motion Picture)	The Rivieras	
"Listen to Me"	2011	Listen to Me: Buddy Holly	Buddy Holly	
"You've Got a Friend in Me"	2011	In the Key of Disney	Randy Newman	
"The Bare Necessities"	2011	In the Key of Disney	Terry Gilkyson	
"Baby Mine"	2011	In the Key of Disney	Ned Washington, Betty Noyes	
"Kiss the Girl"	2011	In the Key of Disney		
"Colors of the Wind"	2011	In the Key of Disney		
"Can You Feel the Love Tonight"	2011	In the Key of Disney		
"We Belong Together"	2011	In the Key of Disney		
"I Just Can't Wait to Be King"	2011	In the Key of Disney		
"Stay Awake"	2011	In the Key of Disney		
" "Heigh-Ho / Whistle While You Work / Yo Ho (A Pirate's Life for Me)"	2011	In the Key of Disney		
"When You Wish Upon a Star"	2011	In the Key of Disney		
"A Dream Is a Wish Your Heart Makes"	2011	In the Key of Disney		
"Peace on Earth"	2011	In the Key of Disney		
"Wanderlust"	2014	The Art of McCartney	Paul McCartney	
"My Sweet Lord" (Live)	2016	George Fest: A Night To Celebrate the Music of George Harrison	George Harrison	
"Honeycomb"	2021	Brian Wilson: Long Promised Road	Bob Merrill	

== See also ==
- The Beach Boys § Influences
- Brian Wilson § Influences

== Bibliography ==
- Badman, Keith (2004). The Beach Boys: The Definitive Diary of America's Greatest Band, on Stage and in the Studio. Backbeat Books. ISBN 978-0-87930-818-6.
- Lambert, Philip (2007). Inside the Music of Brian Wilson: the Songs, Sounds, and Influences of the Beach Boys' Founding Genius. Continuum. ISBN 978-0-8264-1876-0.
