= County Fair (The Beach Boys song) =

Single by The Beach Boys

from the album Surfin' Safari
- A-side: "Ten Little Indians"
- Released: November 26, 1962
- Recorded: September 6, 1962
- Studio: Capitol Studios, Los Angeles, California
- Genre: Rock
- Length: 2:15
- Label: Capitol
- Songwriter(s): Brian Wilson; Gary Usher
- Producer(s): Nik Venet

The Beach Boys singles chronology
"Surfin' Safari" (1962)	"County Fair" (1962)	"Surfin' U.S.A." (1963)

"County Fair" is a song written by Brian Wilson and Gary Usher for the American rock band The Beach Boys. It was originally released as the second track on their 1962 album Surfin' Safari. On November 26 of that year, it was released as the B-side to The Beach Boys' third single, "Ten Little Indians". The same single was released in the UK in January 1963.

The melody of "County Fair" was later recycled into the song "I Do".

== Composition ==
"County Fair" was the second song Brian Wilson and Gary Usher wrote together. In the song, the singer takes his girlfriend to the county fair, where she leaves him for a stronger man; one who can ring the bell on a high striker game. The song culminates in the tag, as the girl leaves the singer, calling him a loser. The song is in verse-chorus form, though the choruses consist of spoken-word narration of the girlfriend and a carnival barker over an organ melody.

== Recording ==
"County Fair" was recorded by The Beach Boys on September 6, 1962, during the last recording session for their first album, Surfin' Safari. Nik Venet produced the session at Capitol Studios.

=== Personnel ===
According to Keith Badman

The Beach Boys

- Mike Love – vocals
- David Marks – guitar
- Brian Wilson – bass guitar, organ, vocals
- Carl Wilson – guitar, vocals
- Dennis Wilson – drums, vocals

Additional musicians and production staff

- Andrea Carlo – voice of girlfriend
- Nik Venet – carnival barker

== Reception ==
With "County Fair" as its B-side, "Ten Little Indians" charted at #49 on the Billboard Hot 100. This was the lowest placement of any Beach Boys single until "Bluebirds Over the Mountain" in 1968. The single did not chart in the UK.

Cash Box said that the Beach Boys "sock out with coin-catching authority" on "County Fair."
