= The 50th Reunion Tour =

2012 concert tour by the Beach Boys

The 50th Anniversary Reunion Tour
- World tour by the Beach Boys
- Associated album: That's Why God Made the Radio
- Start date: April 24, 2012
- End date: September 28, 2012
- Legs: 4
- No. of shows: 50 in North America; 13 in Europe; 5 in Asia; 5 in Oceania; 73 in total

The 50th Anniversary Reunion Tour was a 2012 world concert tour by the American rock band the Beach Boys. The tour marked the first time since 1982 that founding member Brian Wilson had consistently performed on a full tour with the band, and his last tour with the band before his death in 2025. The tour also marked the first time that the Beach Boys had played at the Hollywood Bowl since 1967, having sold it out both times.

Brian Wilson stated that this Beach Boys tour, and the album associated with it, That's Why God Made the Radio, which was released in June 2012, is dedicated to the memory of his two brothers: Dennis, who drowned in 1983, and youngest brother Carl, who died of cancer in 1998. The tour featured tributes to both brothers in which the band accompanied archival audio of vocals by Dennis ("Forever") and Carl ("God Only Knows").

== Overview ==
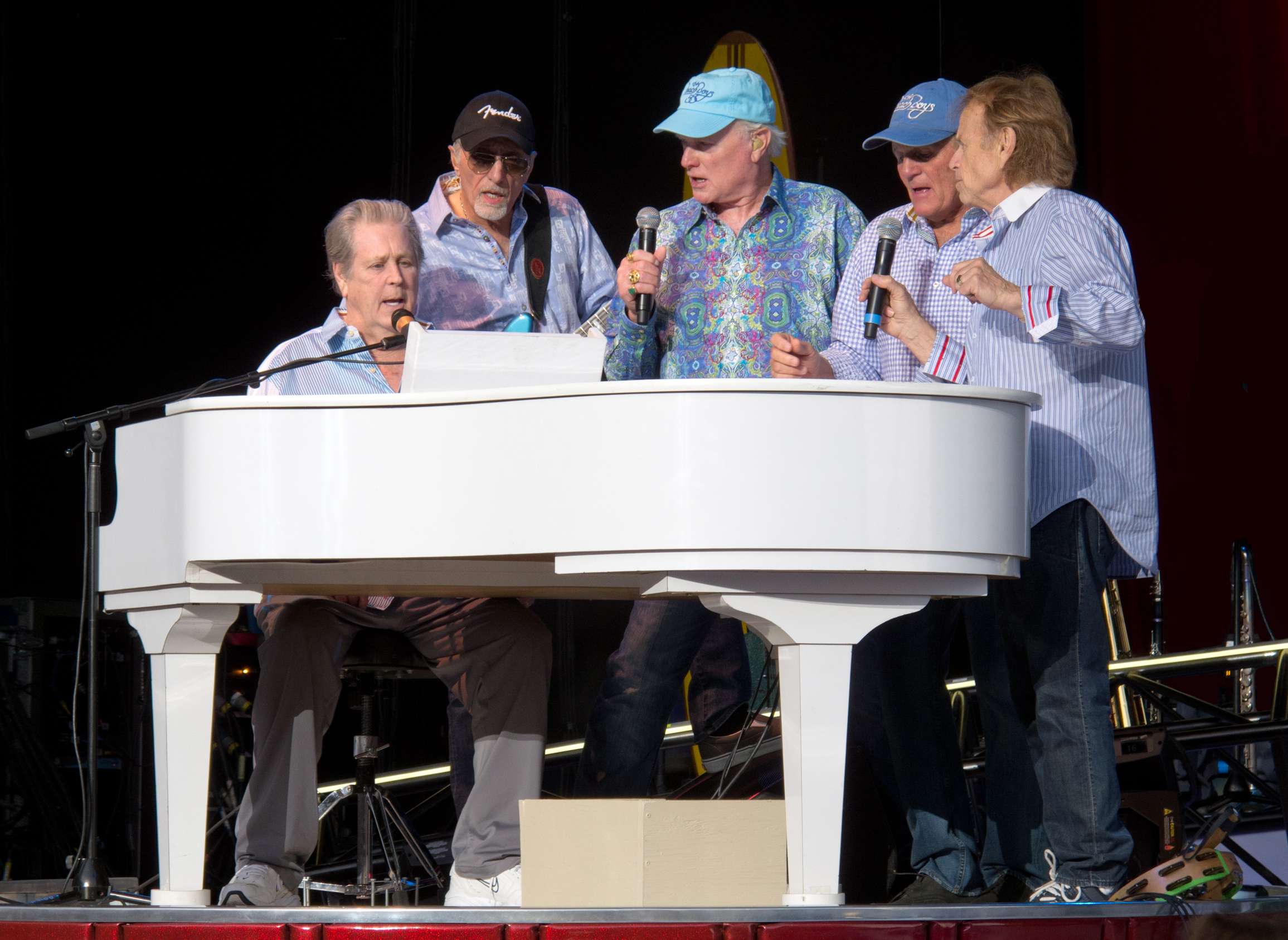
The reunited Beach Boys performing in May 2012.

The Beach Boys gave a performance and interview segment on SiriusXM which was aired on the sixties channel on May 26, 2012 during an entire four-day weekend devoted to the group. During the tour the band made various television appearances on their off days including an April 29, 2012 segment on CBS Sunday Morning, a multi-performances and an interview on Late Night with Jimmy Fallon on May 7, 2012 and a May 16, 2012 interview and a special one-hour performance on shopping channel QVC where they also promoted and sold copies of the new album. On May 18, 2012 the band appeared for an hour-long interview on Charlie Rose Show and performed on The Tonight Show with Jay Leno June 7, 2012. Throughout June and July, PBS aired a 90-minute performance by the band featuring footage from their May 2, 2012 show in Florida. On June 15, 2012, the same date they played a show in Maryland, the group appeared in New York on Good Morning America for an 8 A.M. performance.

The band also announced plans to release their 51-song performance from Red Rocks on DVD although nothing was officially confirmed. One hour of live soundboard audio, primarily from the Grand Prairie, Texas performance, is available for free download on the National Public Radio web site.

Doin' It Again, an hour-long documentary which featured a new biography, new interviews with the band and footage from the tour and which also aired during the summer on PBS, was released on DVD and Blu-ray in August 2012. The Beach Boys Live in Concert: 50th Anniversary was released on DVD and Blu-ray in November 2012 and features a performance by the band from July 2012 in Phoenix, Arizona. The release featured a heavily edited performance which was cut down to sixty minutes and only twenty one of the fifty songs performed at the concert were featured leaving some fans angry that the full show wasn't released. A 41-song, 2-CD set titled Live – The 50th Anniversary Tour was released in May 2013.

== Notable shows and guests ==
During the performance on May 8, 2012 at the Beacon Theater, Dennis' vocals malfunctioned on "Forever" shortly after the song began; John Stamos, who sang a remake of the number on Summer in Paradise, came on stage with a white towel around his neck, furthering the appearance that he was caught by surprise, to perform impromptu lead vocals. Upon finishing, the crowd cheered approval, and many were heard screaming 'Uncle Jesse', referring to his days playing Jesse Katsopolis on the 1980s sitcom Full House.

During the group's June 2, 2012, show they were joined onstage by the group California Saga, which is an eight-piece group made up of the children of Brian, Carl and Dennis Wilson, Mike Love and Al Jardine. California Saga, which includes both Wendy Wilson and Carnie Wilson of the chart topping group, Wilson Phillips, joined the Beach Boys for a performance of "Friends" while Justyn Wilson (son of Carl) and Matt Jardine (son of Al) also joined on "All This is That" with Wilson singing his father's parts. The group also opened the June 3, 2012, show with a 20-minute set consisting of Beach Boys songs.

At the group's June 3, 2012, performance at the Verizon Wireless Amphitheater in Irvine, California, they were joined onstage for the last few songs by Dean Torrence, surviving member of Jan and Dean. Bruce Johnston stepped away from his keyboard to take photographs from the front of the stage of Torrence singing with The Beach Boys.

On June 13, 2012, Foster the People opened for the Beach Boys at Blossom Music Center, near Cleveland. They also performed "Wouldn't It Be Nice" and other songs during the encore with the Beach Boys.

== Ending controversy ==
Asked in May 2012 about the group's future beyond the tour, Mike Love stated that "We're looking at our present and future. I think we're going to be doing this again with Brian for a long time." Wilson said that he was already thinking of the next Beach Boys album, which he would make after the tour. "This time I would like to do some rock n' roll", Wilson said. "I would like it to be a bit harder and faster". In Love's 2016 memoir, he wrote that the end of the reunion came partly as a result of interference from Brian's wife and manager Melinda Ledbetter. Love added that during the performances, she attempted to install an autotune unit on each of the band members' microphones. This was the beginning of some backstage quarrels between Love and Ledbetter, which ended with his stipulating that she be banned from rehearsals until the tour was over.

=== Announcement ===
On June 1, 2012, Love received an e-mail from Ledbetter stating "no more shows for Wilson". Love, who is obligated by his license of the Beach Boys name to maintain revenue flow to Brother Records, then began accepting invitations for when the reunion was over. Johnston told reporter Mark Dillon in mid-June that the current tour was "a one-time event. You're not going to see this next year. I'm busy next year doing my thing with Mike." On June 25, Ledbetter sent another e-mail asking to disregard her last message, but by then, according to Love, "it was too late. We had booked other concerts, and promoters had begun selling tickets." The next day, Love announced additional touring dates that would not feature Wilson. Wilson then denied knowledge of these new dates.

In July, Love stated, "There's talk of us going and doing a return to the Grammys next year, and there's talk about doing another album together. There's nothing in stone, but there's a lot of ideas being floated around. So after this year, after completing the 50th anniversary reunion, we'll entertain doing some more studio work and see what we can come up with and can do in the future." Love said that Wilson and producer Joe Thomas had over 80 hours of material recorded, much of it culled from material they had been working on around the time of Wilson's 1998 Imagination album that "were always songs he had earmarked for the Beach Boys." He further added that the label was "stoked" about what was happening and were pushing for more music and tour dates.

=== Press furor ===
As scheduled, the band played their last show together on September 28, 2012. Love later wrote: "I had wanted to send out a joint press release, between Brian and me, formally announcing the end of the reunion tour on September 28. But I couldn't get Brian's management team on board (Brian himself doesn't make those kinds of decisions)." In late September, news outlets began reporting that Love had dismissed Wilson from the Beach Boys.

On October 5, Love responded in a self-written press release to the LA Times stating he "did not fire Brian Wilson from the Beach Boys. I cannot fire Brian Wilson from the Beach Boys ... I do not have such authority. And even if I did, I would never fire Brian Wilson from the Beach Boys." He explained that nobody in the band "wanted to do a 50th anniversary tour that lasted 10 years" and that its limited run "was long agreed upon". On October 9, Wilson and Jardine submitted a written response to the rumors stating: "I was completely blindsided by his press release ... We hadn't even discussed as a band what we were going to do with all the offers that were coming in for more 50th shows." Love responded in an interview that Wilson's statements in this press release were falsified by his agents.

Reflecting upon the band's reunion in 2013, Love stated: "I had a wonderful experience being in the studio together. Brian has lost none of his ability to structure those melodies and chord progressions ... Touring was more for the fans. ... It was a great experience, it had a term to it, and now everyone's going on with their ways of doing things." Biographer Jon Stebbins speculated that Love declined to continue working with the group because of the lesser control he had over the touring process, coupled with the lower financial gain, noting: "Night after night after night after night, Mike is making less money getting reminded that Brian is more popular than him. And he has to answer to people instead of calling all the shots himself." Writer Stacey Anderson called Love's arguments "wholly unconvincing", facetiously summarizing: "He insists that the larger ensemble with Wilson would have overpowered the modest venues he'd already booked; as anyone can infer, this really means he would have lost money by including Wilson."

== Setlist ==
The set list for the tour, which varied from show to show, consisted of around 48 songs (with final shows reaching 50 or more songs), divided into two sets, an intermission and an encore. At least one song from every Beach Boys album was performed with the exception of songs from Friends, Love You, Keepin' the Summer Alive and Summer in Paradise. (The title track of Friends was performed during the June 2, 2012 show by California Saga, but nothing from the album was performed by the Beach Boys.) As stated before the tour, the two singles and "Summer's Gone" from That's Why God Made the Radio were performed, the latter at the two London shows at the end of the tour.

Songs performed

Surfin' Safari

- "409"
- "Surfin' Safari"

Surfin' U.S.A.

- "Shut Down"
- "Surfin' U.S.A."

Surfer Girl

- "Catch a Wave"
- "Hawaii"
- "In My Room"
- "Little Deuce Coupe"
- "Surfer Girl"

Little Deuce Coupe

- "Ballad of Ole' Betsy"
- "Be True to Your School"

Shut Down Volume 2

- "Don't Worry Baby"
- "Fun, Fun, Fun"
- "Why Do Fools Fall in Love"

All Summer Long

- "All Summer Long"
- "Don't Back Down"
- "I Get Around"
- "Little Honda"
- "Wendy"

Beach Boys Concert

- "Johnny B. Goode" ^{b}

The Beach Boys Today!

- "Dance, Dance, Dance"
- "Do You Wanna Dance?"
- "Help Me, Rhonda"
- "Kiss Me, Baby"
- "Please Let Me Wonder"
- "When I Grow Up (To Be a Man)"

Summer Days (And Summer Nights!!)

- "California Girls"
- "Salt Lake City" ^{c}
- "Then I Kissed Her"
- "You're So Good to Me"
- "Let Him Run Wild"

Beach Boys' Party!

- "Barbara Ann"
- "There's No Other (Like My Baby)"^{b}

Pet Sounds

- "God Only Knows"
- "I Just Wasn't Made for These Times"
- "Pet Sounds"
- "Sloop John B"
- "Wouldn't It Be Nice"

Smiley Smile/Smile

- "Good Vibrations"
- "Heroes and Villains"

Wild Honey

- "Darlin'"

Friends

- "Friends" ^{a}

Best of The Beach Boys Vol. 3

- "The Little Girl I Once Knew"

20/20

- "Cotton Fields"
- "Do It Again"
- "Our Prayer"

Sunflower

- "Add Some Music to Your Day"
- "Forever"
- "This Whole World"

Surf's Up

- "Disney Girls (1957)"

Carl and the Passions – "So Tough"

- "All This Is That"
- "Marcella"

Holland

- "California Saga: California"
- "Sail On, Sailor"

15 Big Ones

- "It's O.K."
- "Rock and Roll Music"

M.I.U. Album

- "Come Go with Me"

L.A. (Light Album)

- "Good Timin'"

The Beach Boys

- "Getcha Back"

Made in U.S.A.

- "California Dreamin'"

Still Cruisin'

- "Kokomo"
- "Still Cruisin'"

That's Why God Made the Radio

- "Isn't It Time"
- "Summer's Gone"
- "That's Why God Made the Radio"

Miscellaneous

- "Rain" ^{b}

^{a} California Saga, an eight-member group featuring the children of the Wilson brothers, Love and Jardine performed the song during the Beach Boys June 2, 2012 show.
^{b} Performed for VIP Nation "ultimate VIP package" and "soundcheck package" ticket holders.
^{c} Partially performed on 7/4/12 in Utah as an intro to "Fun, Fun, Fun".

== Tour dates ==
Date	City	Country	Venue
North America
April 24, 2012	Tucson	United States	Anselmo Valencia Tori Amphitheater
April 26, 2012	Grand Prairie	United States	Verizon Theatre at Grand Prairie
April 27, 2012^{[A]}	New Orleans	United States	Fair Grounds Race Course
April 28, 2012	Atlanta	United States	Chastain Park Amphitheatre
April 29, 2012	Raleigh	United States	Raleigh Amphitheater
May 2, 2012	St. Augustine	United States	St. Augustine Amphitheatre
May 4, 2012	Hollywood	United States	Hard Rock Live
May 5, 2012	Tampa	United States	Straz Center for the Performing Arts
May 8, 2012	New York City	United States	Beacon Theatre
May 9, 2012	New York City	United States	Beacon Theatre
May 11, 2012	Pittsburgh	United States	Benedum Center
May 12, 2012	Uncasville	United States	Mohegan Sun Arena
May 13, 2012	Uncasville	United States	Mohegan Sun Arena
May 15, 2012	White Plains	United States	Westchester County Center
May 17, 2012	Bethlehem	United States	Sands Casino Resort Bethlehem
May 19, 2012	Atlantic City	United States	Borgata Events Center
May 21, 2012	Chicago	United States	Chicago Theatre
May 22, 2012	Chicago	United States	Chicago Theatre
May 25, 2012	Chula Vista	United States	Cricket Wireless Amphitheatre
May 26, 2012	Indio	United States	Fantasy Springs Special Events Center
May 27, 2012	Las Vegas	United States	Red Rock Resort Spa and Casino
May 28, 2012	Santa Barbara	United States	Santa Barbara Bowl
June 1, 2012	Berkeley	United States	Hearst Greek Theatre
June 2, 2012	Los Angeles	United States	Hollywood Bowl
June 3, 2012	Irvine	United States	Verizon Wireless Amphitheater
June 8, 2012	The Woodlands	United States	Cynthia Woods Mitchell Pavilion
June 10, 2012^{[B]}	Manchester	United States	Great Stage Park
June 12, 2012	Cincinnati	United States	Riverbend Music Center
June 13, 2012	Cuyahoga Falls	United States	Blossom Music Center
June 15, 2012	Columbia	United States	Merriweather Post Pavilion
June 16, 2012	Camden	United States	Susquehanna Bank Center
June 17, 2012	Bethel	United States	Bethel Woods Center for the Arts
June 19, 2012	Toronto	Canada	Molson Canadian Amphitheatre
June 20, 2012	Montreal	Canada	Bell Centre
June 22, 2012	Bangor	United States	Darling's Waterfront Pavilion
June 23, 2012	Saratoga Springs	United States	Saratoga Performing Arts Center
June 24, 2012	Wantagh	United States	Nikon at Jones Beach Theater
June 26, 2012	Boston	United States	Bank of America Pavilion
June 27, 2012	Holmdel Township	United States	PNC Bank Arts Center
June 29, 2012	Darien	United States	Darien Lake Performing Arts Center
June 30, 2012	Clarkston	United States	DTE Energy Music Theatre
July 1, 2012^{[C]}	Milwaukee	United States	Marcus Amphitheater
July 3, 2012	Virginia Beach	United States	Farm Bureau Live at Virginia Beach
July 4, 2012	Provo	United States	LaVell Edwards Stadium
July 6, 2012	Albuquerque	United States	Sandia Resort and Casino
July 7, 2012	Phoenix	United States	Grand Canyon University
July 10, 2012	Morrison	United States	Red Rocks Amphitheatre
July 11, 2012	Calgary	Canada	Scotiabank Saddledome
July 13, 2012	Woodinville	United States	Chateau Ste. Michelle
July 14, 2012	Eugene	United States	Cuthbert Amphitheater
July 15, 2012	Stateline	United States	Harveys Outdoor Arena
Europe
July 21, 2012^{[D]}	Avila	Spain	Ávila Festival Grounds
July 23, 2012	Barcelona	Spain	Poble Espanyol
July 26, 2012	Rome	Italy	Capannelle Racecourse
July 27, 2012	Milan	Italy	Arena Civica
July 29, 2012	Gothenburg	Sweden	Trädgårdsföreningen
July 31, 2012	Oslo	Norway	Oslo Spektrum
August 1, 2012	Aarhus	Denmark	Musikhuset Aarhus
August 3, 2012	Berlin	Germany	O_{2} World Berlin
August 4, 2012	Stuttgart	Germany	Hanns-Martin-Schleyer-Halle
August 5, 2012	Mönchengladbach	Germany	Warsteiner HockeyPark
August 7, 2012^{[E]}	Lokeren	Belgium	Grote Kaai
Asia
August 16, 2012	Chiba	Japan	Chiba Marine Stadium
August 17, 2012	Osaka	Japan	Osaka Prefectural Gymnasium
August 19, 2012	Nagoya	Japan	Nippon Gaishi Hall
August 22, 2012	Singapore		Singapore Indoor Stadium
August 25, 2012	Hong Kong		Hong Kong Convention and Exhibition Centre
Oceania
August 28, 2012	Brisbane	Australia	Brisbane Entertainment Centre
August 30, 2012	Sydney	Australia	Allphones Arena
August 31, 2012	Melbourne	Australia	Rod Laver Arena
September 2, 2012	Adelaide	Australia	Adelaide Entertainment Centre
September 6, 2012	Perth	Australia	Burswood Dome
Europe
September 27, 2012	London	England	Royal Albert Hall
September 28, 2012	London	England	Wembley Arena

Festivals and other miscellaneous performances
^{A} This concert was a part of the "New Orleans Jazz & Heritage Festival"
^{B} This concert was a part of the "Bonnaroo Music Festival"
^{C} This concert was a part of "Summerfest"
^{D} This concert was a part of the "Festival Internacional Sierra de Gredos"
^{E} This concert will be a part of the "Lokerse Festival"

=== Box office score data ===
Venue	City	Tickets sold / available	Gross revenue
Verizon Theatre	Grand Prairie, Texas	3,716 / 5,364 (69%)	$243,540
Morsani Hall	Tampa, Florida	2,467 / 2,610 (96%)	$285,347
Beacon Theatre	New York City	5,428 / 5,571 (97%)	$576,143
Mohegan Sun Arena	Uncasville, Connecticut	8,456 / 10,234 (83%)	$590,605
Sands Bethlehem Event Center	Bethlehem, Pennsylvania	1,698 / 1,800 (94%)	$159,372
Chicago Theatre	Chicago	6,643 / 6,643 (100%)	$742,131
Santa Barbara Bowl	Santa Barbara, California	4,451 / 4,451 (100%)	$408,692
Hearst Greek Theatre	Berkeley, California	7,108 / 7,108 (100%)	$514,000
Bell Centre	Montreal	5,040 / 5,725 (88%)	$401,156
Lake Tahoe Outdoor Arena at Harveys	Stateline, Nevada	6,152 / 6,152 (100%)	$554,216
O_{2} World	Berlin, Germany	8,565 / 11,273 (76%)	$510,022
TOTAL		59,724 / 66,931 (89%)	$4,985,224

== Personnel ==
The Beach Boys

The five Beach Boys who participated in the reunion were founding 1961 members Brian Wilson, Mike Love, Al Jardine, 1962 addition David Marks and 1965 addition Bruce Johnston.

Founding members and Wilson's two younger brothers Dennis Wilson and Carl Wilson died in 1983 and 1998 respectively. They were both featured during the concerts, performing with pre-recorded vocals on video with the remainder of the band doing the harmonies live on stage.

- Brian Wilson – vocals, keyboards, occasional bass
- Mike Love – vocals, percussion
- Al Jardine – vocals, rhythm guitar, banjo
- David Marks – vocals, lead guitar
- Bruce Johnston – vocals, keyboards

Supporting musicians

- Jeff Foskett – guitar, mandolin, percussion, vocals
- Scott Totten – Musical Director, guitar, bass, ukulele, vocals
- Nicky Walusko – guitar, vocals ^{a}
- Probyn Gregory – guitar, horns, bass, tannerin, percussion, vocals
- Mike D'Amico – bass, drums, vocals
- Darian Sahanaja – keyboards, mallets, vocals
- Scott Bennett – keyboards, mallets, percussion, vocals
- Paul von Mertens – Co-Musical Director, woodwinds
- Nelson Bragg – percussion, vocals
- John Cowsill – drums, vocals

Special Guest Appearances

- America
- Tim Bonhomme – keyboards
- Christopher Cross – vocals
- Bobby Figueroa – percussion (June 30)
- Foster the People
- Billy Hinsche – keyboards
- Adam Jardine – vocals ^{b}
- Matt Jardine – vocals ^{b}
- Ambha Love – vocals ^{b}
- Christian Love – vocals ^{b}
- Taylor Mills – vocals
- John Stamos – drums, percussion, guitar, vocals
- Dean Torrence – guitar, vocals
- Carl B. Wilson – vocals ^{b}
- Carnie Wilson – vocals ^{b}
- Justyn Wilson – vocals ^{b}
- Wendy Wilson – vocals ^{b}

^{a} Nicky Walusko became ill partway through the tour and left.
^{b} Members of California Saga, a group made up of the children of Beach Boys members Brian, Carl and Dennis Wilson, Mike Love and Al Jardine.
