= Heads You Win–Tails I Lose =

Song by The Beach Boys

from the album Surfin' Safari
- Released: October 1, 1962
- Recorded: September 6, 1962; Capitol Studios
- Genre: Surf rock
- Length: 2:17
- Label: Capitol
- Songwriter(s): Brian Wilson; Gary Usher
- Producer(s): Nik Venet

"Heads You Win–Tails I Lose" is a song written by Brian Wilson and Gary Usher for the American rock band The Beach Boys. It was released on their 1962 album Surfin' Safari.

== Composition ==
According to lyricist Gary Usher, "Heads You Win–Tails I Lose" resulted from an effort to turn contemporary expressions into songs. The song is in AABA form. In the A sections, the typical doo-wop chord patterns are split in half, and then repeated: I-vi-I-vi-IV-V-IV-V. The B section is a more traditional pattern, much like other songs from Surfin' Safari.

== Recording ==
"Heads You Win–Tails I Lose" was recorded at the last Surfin' Safari session, on September 6, 1962. While Nik Venet is officially credited as producer, some of the participants claim that Brian Wilson did the production work.

=== Personnel ===
The Beach Boys

- Mike Love – lead vocals
- David Marks – rhythm guitar
- Brian Wilson – harmony and backing vocals; bass guitar
- Carl Wilson – harmony and backing vocals; lead guitar
- Dennis Wilson – harmony and backing vocals; drums
