= Chug-A-Lug (The Beach Boys song) =

Song by the Beach Boys

from the album Surfin' Safari
- Released: October 1, 1962
- Recorded: August 8, 1962
- Studio: Capitol Studios
- Genre: Surf rock
- Length: 1:59
- Label: Capitol
- Songwriters: Brian Wilson; Gary Usher; Mike Love
- Producer: Nick Venet

"Chug-A-Lug" is a song written by Brian Wilson, Gary Usher and Mike Love for the American rock band the Beach Boys. It was released on their 1962 album Surfin' Safari.

== Composition ==
"Chug-A-Lug" is in a standard verse-chorus form, which is the most common song structure in the Beach Boys' music. The lyrics of the song are about the members of the band hanging out at a root beer stand and drinking mugs of root beer while talking about girls, cars, and music.

The song begins with a truncated statement of the hook, before leading directly into the verse. The verse consists of a lead melody, sung by Love, set against a background choir of "Oohs." The chorus sounds for six bars in a blues progression, before moving directly into the hook, resulting in an eight-bar phrase that is balanced with eight bars of the verse.

Prior to the song being recorded, Brian Wilson stated in a July 1962 radio interview that it would be the Beach Boys' next single following "Surfin' Safari".

The song was originally credited to just Wilson and Usher. Mike Love's name was added as a result of a lawsuit filed by him against Wilson in 1994.

== Recording ==
"Chug-A-Lug" was recorded at Capitol Records with "Ten Little Indians" and "The Shift" on August 8, 1962. The session was officially produced by Nick Venet, though many of the participants claim that Brian Wilson was just as responsible for the production as Venet.

== Personnel ==
- Mike Love – lead vocal
- David Marks – guitar
- Brian Wilson – bass guitar, organ, vocals
- Carl Wilson – guitar, vocals
- Dennis Wilson – drums, vocals
