= Cuckoo Clock (song) =

Song by The Beach Boys

from the album Surfin' Safari
- Language: English
- Released: October 1, 1962
- Recorded: September 6, 1962; Capitol Studios
- Genre: Surf rock
- Length: 2:08
- Label: Capitol
- Songwriters: Brian Wilson; Gary Usher
- Producer: Nik Venet

"Cuckoo Clock" is a song written by Brian Wilson and Gary Usher for the American rock band The Beach Boys. It was released on their 1962 album Surfin' Safari. The song was written about the myna bird of Brian's father Murry Wilson.

== Composition ==
"Cuckoo Clock" relates the story of a teenage couple trying to spend time together. When things start to get romantic, however, they are interrupted by a cuckoo clock. In the final verse, the teenage boy dismantles the clock so they will not be bothered again. The song is in basic verse-chorus-bridge form. The organ solo in the bridge points the way towards future Beach Boys songs.

== Recording ==
"Cuckoo Clock" was recorded on September 6, 1962, at the last Surfin' Safari session. While Nik Venet is officially credited as producer, some of the participants claim that Brian Wilson did the production work.

=== Personnel ===
- Mike Love – vocals
- David Marks – guitar
- Brian Wilson – bass guitar, organ, lead vocal
- Carl Wilson – guitar, vocals
- Dennis Wilson – drums, vocals
