= Shut Down (album) =

Compilation album by various artists
- Released: June 1963
- Genre: Hot rod rock
- Length: 24:58
- Label: Capitol

Shut Down chronology
| Shut Down (1963) | Shut Down Volume 2 (1964) |

Professional ratings
Review scores
| Source | Rating |
|---|---|
| AllMusic | 2/5 stars |

Shut Down is a multi-artist compilation album released by Capitol Records in mid-June 1963. It contains hot rod music from acts such as the Beach Boys, Robert Mitchum, the Cheers and the Super Stocks. The title is hot rod slang referring to the defeat of an opponent in a drag race.

The album was compiled by Nick Venet and Gary Usher, according to biographer James Murphy, to "trad[e] on the success" of the Beach Boys' hits "409" and "Shut Down". It was a commercial success, peaking at number 8 on August 17 during a 46-week chart run. In 1964, it was followed by Shut Down Volume 2, which only had songs by the Beach Boys.

== Track listing ==
Side one
| No. | Title | Performing artist(s) | Length |
|---|---|---|---|
| 1. | "Shut Down" | The Beach Boys | 1:59 |
| 2. | "Chicken" | The Cheers | 1:55 |
| 3. | "Wide Track" | The Super Stocks | 2:00 |
| 4. | "Brontosaurus Stomp" | The Piltdown Men | 2:28 |
| 5. | "Four on the Floor" | The Super Stocks | 2:00 |
| 6. | "Black Denim Trousers and Motorcycle Boots" | The Cheers | 2:10 |

Side two
| No. | Title | Performing artist(s) | Length |
|---|---|---|---|
| 1. | "409" | The Beach Boys | 1:58 |
| 2. | "Street Machine" | The Super Stocks | 1:55 |
| 3. | "The Ballad of Thunder Road" | Robert Mitchum | 2:28 |
| 4. | "Hot Rod Race" | Jimmy Dolan | 2:10 |
| 5. | "Car Trouble" | The Eligibles | 2:00 |
| 6. | "Cheater Slicks" | The Super Stocks | 1:55 |

== Charts ==
| Chart (1963) | Peak position |
|---|---|
| US Billboard 200 | 8 |
