= Ten Little Indians (The Beach Boys song) =

- U.S. picture sleeve

Single by the Beach Boys

from the album Surfin' Safari
- B-side: "County Fair"
- Released: November 1962
- Recorded: August 8, 1962
- Genre: Surf rock
- Length: 1:30
- Label: Capitol
- Songwriters: Brian Wilson; Gary Usher
- Producer: Nick Venet

The Beach Boys singles chronology
"Surfin' Safari" (1962)	"Ten Little Indians" (1962)	"Surfin' U.S.A." (1963)

"Ten Little Indians" is a song recorded by the American rock band the Beach Boys. It was first released in October 1962 as the third track on the Beach Boys' debut album, Surfin' Safari.

== Background ==
"Ten Little Indians" was written by Brian Wilson and Gary Usher and is based on the traditional children's rhyme of the same name. It was recorded by the Beach Boys at Capitol Studios on August 8, 1962. The instrumental break includes the initial theme in a different key.

In a July 1962 radio interview, Wilson stated that "Chug-a-Lug", which hadn't been recorded at the time, would be the Beach Boys' next single following "Surfin' Safari". According to James B. Murphy, producer Nick Venet offered "C.C. Cinder" to the group as a potential single, but Wilson "hated" the song and refused to record it. Usher later recorded the song as the Sunsets with Dennis Wilson on drums.

== Release and reception ==
Released as a single in November 1962, "Ten Little Indians" charted at number 49 on the Billboard Hot 100. The song was mainly successful in America's Midwest, reaching the top 30 in Chicago, Dallas and Pittsburgh, reaching as high as number nine in Minneapolis (KDWB) in a New Year 1963 chart still dominated by "Surfin' Safari". It wasn't as successful in other regions of America but did reach number 21 on Atlantic City/Philadelphia's WIBG. When released in Sweden, it peaked at number six on the national chart.

Billboard praised the single and called it "a swinger which should get play following the boys' 'Surfin' Safari' hit. Side shows off good vocal and combo work."

== Personnel ==
- Mike Love – lead, harmony and backing vocals; saxophone
- David Marks – harmony and backing vocals, rhythm guitar
- Brian Wilson – harmony and backing vocals, bass guitar
- Carl Wilson – harmony and backing vocals, lead guitar
- Dennis Wilson – harmony and backing vocals, drums

== Charts ==
Chart (1962)	Peak position
Canada CHUM Chart	39
Sweden	6
US Billboard Hot 100	49
US Cash Box Top 100	50
