= Chug-A-Lug =

Chug-a-Lug may refer to:

- "Chug-a-Lug" (Roger Miller song)
- "Chug-A-Lug" (Beach Boys song)
