= Little Girl (You're My Miss America) =

Song by Vincent Catalano and Herb Alpert

Song by The Beach Boys

from the album Surfin' Safari
- Released: October 1, 1962
- Recorded: September 5, 1962
- Studio: Capitol Studios
- Genre: Surf rock
- Length: 2:05
- Label: Capitol
- Songwriters: Herb Alpert; Vincent Catalano
- Producer: Nik Venet

"Little Girl (You're My Miss America)" is a song written by Vincent Catalano and Herb Alpert. It was first recorded by Dante & His Friends; The Beach Boys recording for their 1962 album Surfin' Safari is much better known. The song is known by various names, including "Miss America" and "Little Miss America".

== Composition ==
"Little Girl" is a simple song about a teenager's infatuation with a girl. Unlike the other Beach Boys covers from this era, Brian Wilson changed the form of the song quite a bit, making adaptations and rearranging the song to make it more suited to The Beach Boys.

== The Beach Boys version ==
The Beach Boys recorded this song on September 5, 1962, at their second Capitol Records recording session. It is Dennis Wilson's first lead vocal.

=== Personnel ===
- Dennis Wilson – drums, lead vocal
- Mike Love – vocals
- David Marks – guitar
- Brian Wilson – bass guitar, vocals
- Carl Wilson – guitar, vocals
