= The Gamblers (surf band) =

American band

- Origin: Los Angeles, California, United States
- Genres: Surf music
- Years active: 1959–1961
- Labels: World Pacific; Last Chance
- Past members: Derry Weaver; Bruce Johnston; Elliot Ingber; Larry Taylor; Sandy Nelson

The Gamblers were an American surf music band formed in Los Angeles, California, in 1959. Distinguished by their vocal harmonies and early instrumental surf songs, the Gamblers are one of the first influential musical acts that recorded surf music, a genre popularized initially in Southern California. The group, led by primary songwriter Derry Weaver, recorded the "Moon Dawg!" single in late 1959, acknowledged as one of the earliest known surf records, and covered by West Coast groups such as the Beach Boys. In 1961, the group disbanded but its members, including Elliot Ingber, Larry Taylor, Bruce Johnston, and Sandy Nelson, went on to have successful music careers of their own.

== History ==
Early in October 1959, Nick Venet began working for Richard Bock, a respected West coast jazz record producer at World Pacific, and was enlisted with creating new hit-ready single artists and buying master tapes for World Pacific to release. Venet, with the help of guitarist and songwriter Derry Weaver, assembled a studio group of Los Angeles session musicians to form the Gamblers. The group's line-up consisted of Weaver (lead guitar), Bruce Johnston (keyboards, piano), Elliot Ingber (rhythm guitar), Larry Taylor (bass guitar), and Sandy Nelson (drums).

The Gamblers recorded "Moon Dawg!" and "LSD-25" at American Recording and Radio Recorders. The eventual A-side of their debut single, "Moon Dawg!" is a surf instrumental written by Weaver who was inspired by Alan Freed's on-air nickname "Moondog". Another instrumental on the flip-side, titled "LSD-25", was written by Weaver and Sam Taylor after the pair read about the hallucinogenic drug in a magazine; the song marks the first time LSD is referenced in a musical recording. But as music historian Michael Hicks explained: "The title connotated nothing about the musical content, but only demonstrated that the name 'LSD' was being assimilated into mass culture".

"Moon Dawg!" was released in February 1960. Despite failing to chart nationally, the single found an audience in Southern California where it reached number 12 on the KFWB Fabulous Forty survey and number 15 on the KRLA Tune-dex survey in July that same year. Although historians differ on the single's exact release date, "Moon Dawg!" is considered by some to be the first surf music record, serving as a template for acts that followed the Gamblers and recorded their own version of the song. As the first band to cover it, the Beach Boys helped solidify the track as a staple of surf music on their studio album Surfin' Safari before more renditions by the Challengers, the Tornadoes, the Ventures, and others followed.

The Gamblers disbanded in 1961 soon after the release of their second single "Teen Machine" on Last Chance Records. Johnston subsequently joined the Beach Boys in 1965 on tour to replace Brian Wilson who excused himself from performing to concentrate exclusively on songwriting and record producing. Later, Johnston became a full-time member, making his debut with the group on the song "California Girls". Ingber was an early member of The Mothers of Invention, appearing on the 1966 album Freak Out!. He subsequently formed the psychedelic rock band The Fraternity of Man in the late 1960s, joining Captain Beefheart & The Magic Band in the early 1970s. Before working with Canned Heat, Taylor recorded sessions with Jerry Lee Lewis and The Monkees. Nelson became a well-regarded studio drummer and pursued a solo career that resulted in over 30 albums.
