= Beach Boys Historic Landmark =

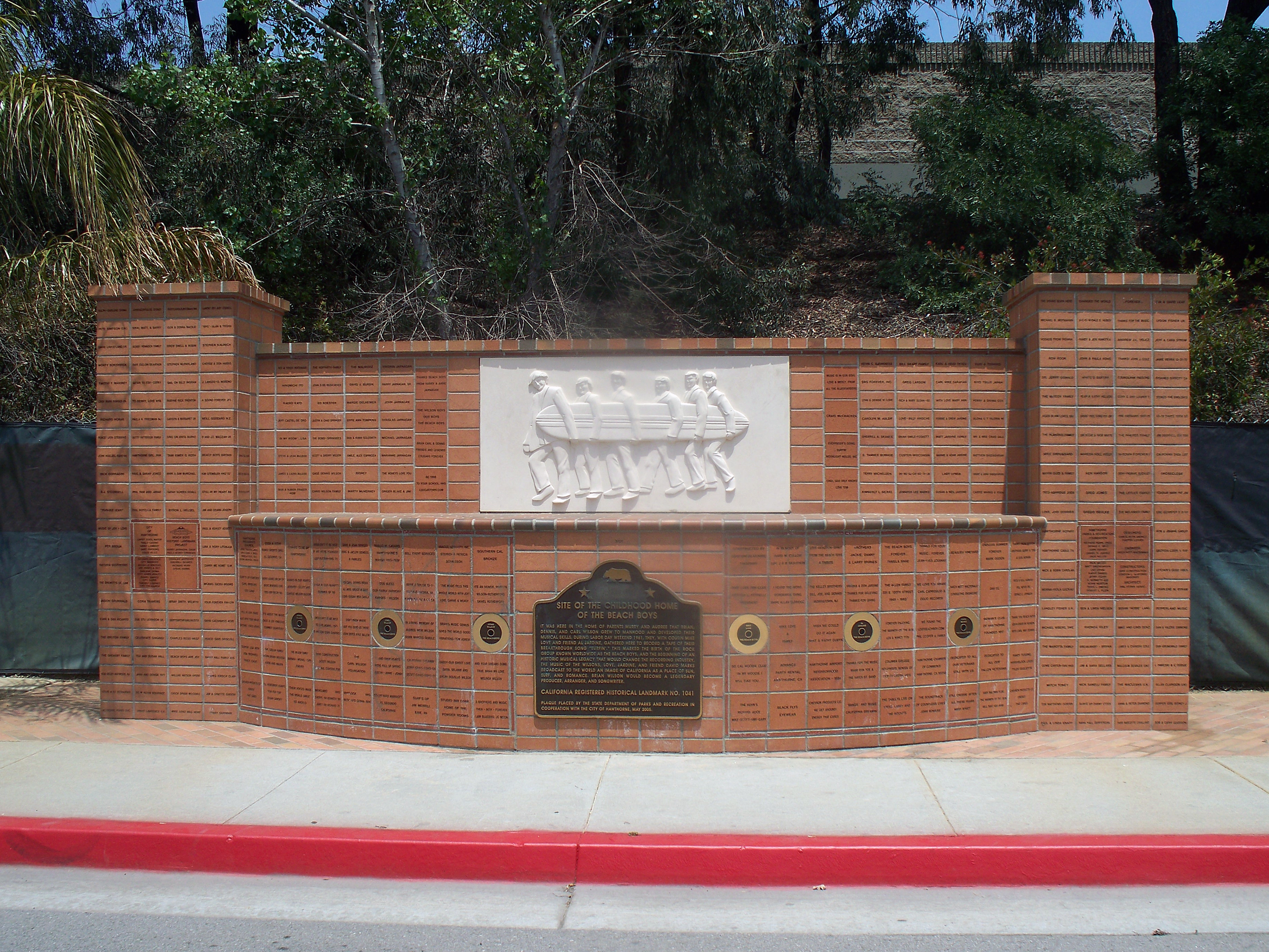
- Beach Boys Landmark

- Location within the Los Angeles metropolitan area
- 33.925229°N 118.337517°W
- Location: 3701 W. 119th St., Hawthorne, California

California Historical Landmark
- Official name: Site of the Childhood Home of the Beach Boys
- Reference no.: 1041

The Beach Boys Historic Landmark is a memorial which commemorates the site of the childhood home of Brian, Dennis, and Carl Wilson of The Beach Boys. The monument, located at 3701 W. 119th Street, Hawthorne, California, stands on the former location of the Wilsons' house, which was demolished in the mid-1980s during construction of the Century Freeway.

Music industry notables such as Dick Clark and the Rock and Roll Hall of Fame were among the letter-writers who supported the memorial's application process. Its status as a California State Historic Landmark, No. 1041 Site of the Childhood Home of the Beach Boys, was granted by the California State Historic Resources Commission in a unanimous vote on August 6, 2004, in Ontario, California, and the monument was dedicated on May 20, 2005.

The image face of the landmark was inspired by the album cover of their third album Surfer Girl (1963). The lineup of the Beach Boys at that time was Brian, Carl, and Dennis; their cousin Mike Love; and David Marks, who grew up in a house across the street from the Wilson home. Al Jardine, the group's original guitarist, would later rejoin the band soon before David's departure. Six gold 45 records are embedded in the base of the landmark, each with the name of one of the Beach Boys; the three Wilson brothers to the left, and Love, Marks and Jardine to the right. The names of donors, Wilson friends and family members, and the Beach Boys Landmark Committee are engraved into the monument bricks. The construction work was undertaken by Scott Wilson, Dennis' adopted son.

The landmark plaque reads:

It was here in the home of parents Murry and Audree that Brian, Dennis, and Carl Wilson grew to manhood and developed their musical skills. During Labor Day weekend 1961, they, their cousin Mike Love, and friend Al Jardine, gathered here to record a tape of their breakthrough song "Surfin'". This marked the birth of the rock group known worldwide as the Beach Boys, and the beginning of a historic musical legacy that would change the recording industry. The music of the Wilsons, Love, Jardine and friend David Marks broadcast to the world an image of California as a place of sun, surf, and romance. Brian Wilson would become a legendary producer, arranger and songwriter.

Less than a month after the unveiling of the landmark, it was targeted by graffiti vandals.
