= Good Timin': Live at Knebworth England 1980 =

Live album by the Beach Boys
- Released: November 26, 2002 (UK); March 4, 2003 (US)
- Recorded: June 21, 1980
- Venue: Knebworth, Hertfordshire
- Genre: Rock
- Length: 70:22
- Label: Brother/Eagle
- Producer: Mark Linett

The Beach Boys chronology
Classics Selected by Brian Wilson (2002)	Good Timin': Live at Knebworth England 1980 (2002)	Sounds of Summer: The Very Best of The Beach Boys (2003)

Professional ratings
Review scores
Source	Rating
Allmusic	3.5/5 stars
Encyclopedia of Popular Music	2/5 stars

Good Timin': Live at Knebworth, England 1980 is the fourth live album and a concert film by American rock band the Beach Boys that was recorded at Knebworth, Hertfordshire on June 21, 1980. It is their only released concert performance that features Brian Wilson, Dennis Wilson, Carl Wilson, Mike Love, Al Jardine and Bruce Johnston together.

The concert, a shared bill with Elkie Brooks, Mike Oldfield and Santana, was the band's last major UK performance together until their 2012 reunion tour. Good Timin' was first issued in the UK in 2002 and the following year in the US, both through the band's Brother Records imprint with independent distribution.

== Track listing ==
All tracks are written by Brian Wilson and Mike Love except where noted.

No.	Title	Writer(s)	Length
1.	"Intro"		0:48
2.	"California Girls"		3:10
3.	"Sloop John B"	traditional, arr B. Wilson	3:04
4.	"Darlin'"		2:37
5.	"School Day (Ring! Ring! Goes the Bell)"	Chuck Berry	3:26
6.	"God Only Knows"	B. Wilson, Tony Asher	2:51
7.	"Be True To Your School"		2:27
8.	"Do It Again"		3:07
9.	"Little Deuce Coupe"	B. Wilson, Roger Christian	2:14
10.	"Cotton Fields/Heroes And Villains"	Huddie Ledbetter/B. Wilson, Van Dyke Parks	5:18
11.	"Happy Birthday, Brian"	Mildred J. Hill, Patty Smith Hill	1:24
12.	"Keepin' The Summer Alive"	C. Wilson, Randy Bachman	3:42
13.	"Lady Lynda"	Al Jardine, Ron Altbach	5:00
14.	"Surfer Girl"	B. Wilson	2:39
15.	"Help Me, Rhonda"		4:04
16.	"Rock & Roll Music"	Berry	2:22
17.	"I Get Around"		2:13
18.	"Surfin' U.S.A."	B. Wilson, Berry	2:54
19.	"You Are So Beautiful"	Billy Preston, Bruce Fisher	3:13
20.	"Good Vibrations"		6:03
21.	"Barbara Ann"	Fred Fassert	2:45
22.	"Fun, Fun, Fun"		4:49
Total length:			70:22

== Certifications ==
Region	Certification	Certified units/sales
Australia (ARIA)	Platinum	15,000^{^}
^{^} Shipments figures based on certification alone.
