= Little Deuce Coupe =

1963 album by the Beach Boys

Studio album by the Beach Boys
- Released: October 7, 1963
- Recorded: April 19, 1962 ("409"); January 5 – September 2, 1963
- Studios: Western, Hollywood
- Genre: Hot rod rock
- Length: 25:25
- Label: Capitol
- Producer: Brian Wilson

The Beach Boys chronology
| Surfer Girl (1963) | Little Deuce Coupe (1963) | Shut Down Volume 2 (1964) |

The Beach Boys UK chronology
| Surfin' U.S.A. (1965) | Little Deuce Coupe (1965) | Beach Boys' Party! (1966) |

Official audio
- "Little Deuce Coupe" (Remastered 2001) on YouTube

Contemporary professional ratings
Review scores
| Source | Rating |
|---|---|
| Record Mirror | 4/5 stars |

Retrospective professional ratings
Review scores
| Source | Rating |
|---|---|
| AllMusic | 2/5 stars |
| Blender | 3/5 stars |
| Encyclopedia of Popular Music | 3/5 stars |
| The Rolling Stone Album Guide | 3/5 stars |

Little Deuce Coupe is the fourth album by the American rock band the Beach Boys, released October 7, 1963, by Capitol Records. It reached No. 4 in the U.S. during a chart stay of 46 weeks, and was eventually certified platinum by the RIAA. It is considered to be one of the earliest examples of a rock concept album. It was the band’s final album with guitarist David Marks until 2012's That's Why God Made the Radio. Marks departed from the Beach Boys following disagreements with manager Murry Wilson. It is also the band's first album with a name not related to surfing.

The album was released three weeks after Surfer Girl. Four of the tracks from Little Deuce Coupe ("409", "Shut Down", "Little Deuce Coupe", and "Our Car Club") had already appeared on previous albums and, discounting an alternate recording of "Be True to Your School", no tracks from the album were issued as an A-sided single.

== Production ==
As with the preceding Surfer Girl album, the date assigned for recording all eight of the new tracks (September 2, 1963) is highly doubtful. However, as no AFM contracts from these sessions are known to exist, the actual dates are currently unknown.

Although Nick Venet was listed as producer for "Shut Down" and Murry Wilson for "409", the official producer's credit for the entire Little Deuce Coupe album cites only Brian Wilson. Despite the rushed nature of the album's sessions, Wilson's song arrangements were notably becoming more complex, specifically songs like "No-Go Showboat" and "Custom Machine". This was the last Beach Boys album to officially include rhythm guitarist David Marks until 2012's That's Why God Made the Radio. According to James B. Murphy, Marks wanted Brian to consider including his song "Kustom Kar Show" (co-written with Mark Groseclose) on the album, though it was ultimately not recorded.

After the album's recording, Wilson re-recorded "Be True to Your School" for single release on October 28, resulting in another top 10 hit. An original Christmas-themed composition, "Little Saint Nick" was also recorded that month and issued as a Christmas single.

== Title and cover art ==
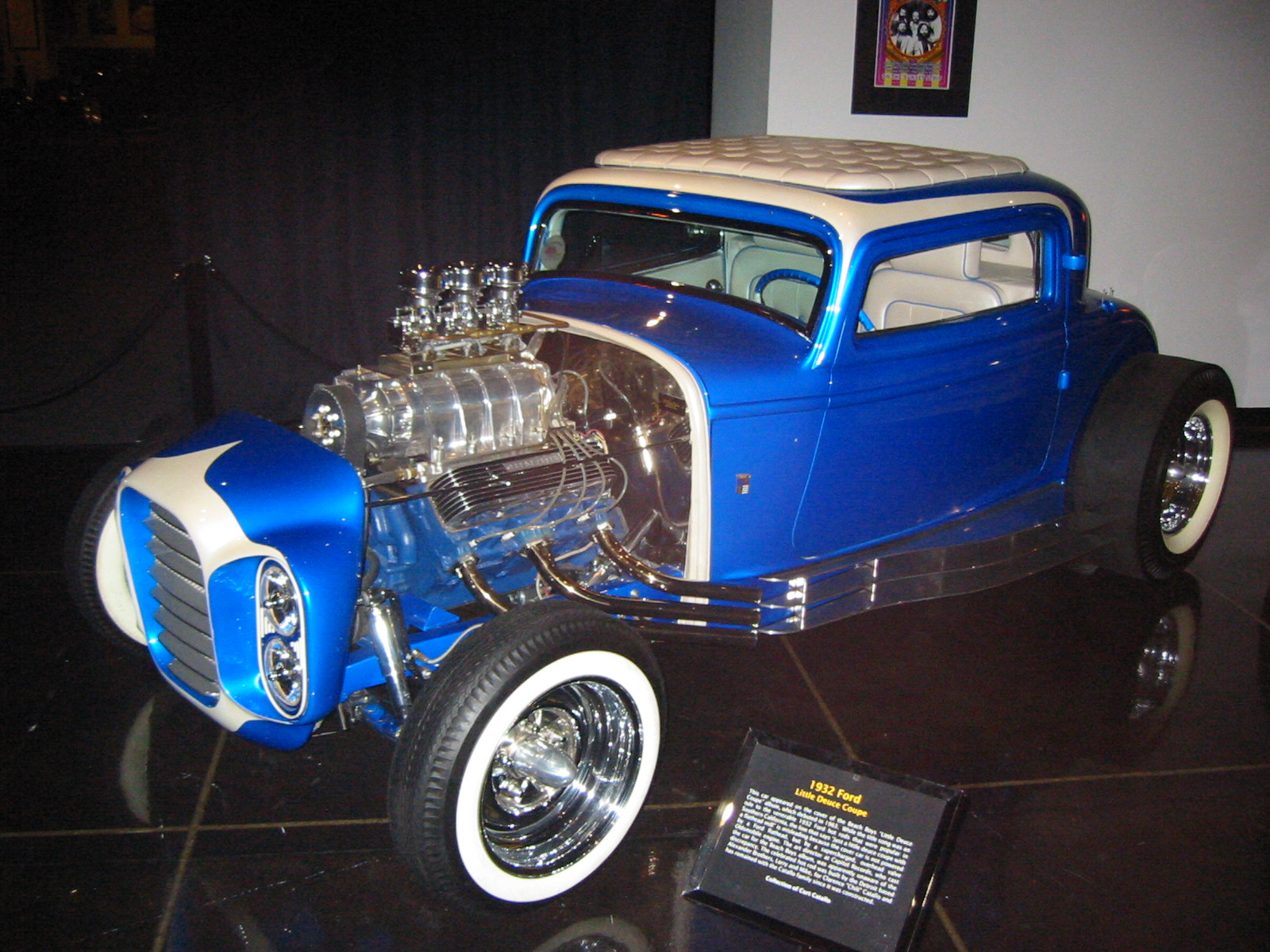
The titular "little deuce coupe" that appeared on the cover, pictured in 2006

A Deuce Coupe is a 1932 Ford Coupe (deuce referring to the "2" in "1932"). This was considered by many to be the definitive "hot rod". The Model B had four cylinders and the Model 18 featured the Ford flathead V8 engine when the car was introduced. The pink slip mentioned in the lyrics referred to the pink paper vehicle title held by the car's owner.

The picture featured on the front cover of the album was supplied by Hot Rod magazine, and features the body (with his head cropped out of the photo) of hot-rod owner Clarence 'Chili' Catallo and his own customized three-window 1932 Ford Coupe – known to hot rod enthusiasts as "the lil' deuce coupe".

== Track listing ==
Side one
| No. | Title | Writer(s) | Lead vocal(s) | Length |
|---|---|---|---|---|
| 1. | "Little Deuce Coupe" | Brian Wilson; Roger Christian | Mike Love | 1:38 |
| 2. | "Ballad of Ole' Betsy" | Wilson; Christian | Brian Wilson | 2:15 |
| 3. | "Be True to Your School" | Wilson; Love | Love | 2:06 |
| 4. | "Car Crazy Cutie" | Wilson; Christian | B. Wilson | 2:47 |
| 5. | "Cherry, Cherry Coupe" | Wilson; Christian | Love | 1:47 |
| 6. | "409" | Wilson; Gary Usher; Love | Love | 1:58 |

Side two
| No. | Title | Writer(s) | Lead vocal(s) | Length |
|---|---|---|---|---|
| 1. | "Shut Down" | Wilson; Christian | Love | 1:48 |
| 2. | "Spirit of America" | Wilson; Christian | B. Wilson | 2:23 |
| 3. | "Our Car Club" | Wilson; Love | Love; B. Wilson | 2:21 |
| 4. | "No-Go Showboat" | Wilson; Christian | Wilson; Love | 1:54 |
| 5. | "A Young Man Is Gone" | Bobby Troup | The Beach Boys | 2:15 |
| 6. | "Custom Machine" | Wilson; Love | Love | 1:38 |
| Total length: | | | | 25:25 |

Little Deuce Coupe / All Summer Long 1990/2001 CD reissue bonus tracks
| No. | Title | Writer(s) | Lead vocal(s) | Length |
|---|---|---|---|---|
| 13. | "Be True to Your School" (single version) | Wilson; Love | Love | 2:10 |
| 14. | "All Dressed Up for School" | B. Wilson | Carl Wilson | 2:24 |
| 15. | "Little Honda" (alternate take) | Wilson; Love | Love | 2:13 |
| 16. | "Don't Back Down" (alternate take) | Wilson; Love | Love | 1:39 |
| Total length: | | | | 33:51 |

Notes

- Some reissues of the album omit "Car Crazy Cutie" and "Custom Machine".
- Because "409" was only available in mono, a Duophonic (fake stereo) mix was used on the otherwise true stereo version of the album. Both stereo and mono mixes are available on the 2012 CD.
- Mike Love was not originally credited for "Be True to Your School", "409", "Don't Back Down", and "Custom Machine". His credits were awarded after a 1994 court case.

== Personnel ==
The Beach Boys

- Al Jardine - harmony and backing vocals, bass
- Mike Love - lead vocals, harmony and backing vocals, possible saxophone
- Brian Wilson - lead vocals, harmony and backing vocals, piano, organ, bass, producer
- Carl Wilson - harmony and backing vocals, lead guitar, possible bass and rhythm guitar
- Dennis Wilson - harmony and backing vocals, drums
- David Marks - rhythm guitar, possible harmony and backing vocals

Production staff

- Chuck Britz - audio engineer

== Charts ==
| Chart (1963) | Peak position |
|---|---|
| US Billboard Top LPs | 4 |
