= Surfin' U.S.A. =

Single by the Beach Boys

Single by the Beach Boys

from the album Surfin' U.S.A.
- B-side: "Shut Down"
- Released: March 4, 1963
- Recorded: January 5, 1963
- Studio: Western, Hollywood
- Genre: Vocal surf; rock and roll
- Length: 2:29
- Label: Capitol
- Songwriters: Chuck Berry; Brian Wilson
- Producer: Nick Venet

The Beach Boys singles chronology
"Ten Little Indians" (1962)	"Surfin' U.S.A." (1963)	"Surfer Girl" (1963)

Licensed audio
- "Surfin' U.S.A." on YouTube

"Surfin' U.S.A." is a song by the American rock band the Beach Boys, credited to Chuck Berry and Brian Wilson. It is a rewritten version of Berry's "Sweet Little Sixteen" set to new lyrics written by Wilson. The song was released as a single on March 4, 1963, backed with "Shut Down". It was then placed as the opening track on their album of the same name.

The single peaked at number two on the chart of the Music Vendor trade paper (within a year renamed Record World) and at number three on the Billboard and Cash Box charts. Billboard ranked "Surfin' U.S.A." the number 1 song of 1963. It has since become emblematic of the California sound, and the song's depiction of California is emblematic of the genre. Professor Dale Carter notes that the Beach Boys' lyrics depict them as "enjoying all the material benefits of the promised land (typified by southern California) ... liberty and security are accommodated at drive-in and drag strip, on surf board and in T-Bird, from hamburger stand to beach party." This theme is present in "Surfin' U.S.A.", as well as other Beach Boys' songs.

The song "Surfin' U.S.A." is part of The Rock and Roll Hall of Fame's 500 Songs that Shaped Rock and Roll list.

== Composition ==
Sample of "Surfin' U.S.A."

The song features Brian Wilson's surfing-related lyrics set to the music and basic lyrical structure of Chuck Berry's "Sweet Little Sixteen". According to Wilson:

"I was going with a girl named Judy Bowles, and her brother Jimmy was a surfer. He knew all the surfing spots. I started humming the melody to 'Sweet Little Sixteen' and I got fascinated with the fact of doing it, and I thought to myself, 'God! What about trying to put surf lyrics to 'Sweet Little Sixteen's melody? The concept was about, 'They are doing this in this city, and they're doing that in that city' So I said to Jimmy, 'Hey Jimmy, I want to do a song mentioning all the surf spots.' So he gave me a list."

With this idea, "Surfin’ U.S.A" uses the comparison of California to the rest of the United States to drive its stereotypical images of California. The song opens by posing an alternative reality: “If everybody had an ocean across the USA, then everybody’d be surfin’ like Californi-a.” These opening lyrics show California in a favorable light, theorizing that if everyone in the U.S. had the same California-like privileges to a beach, they would enjoy going surfing.

Additionally, "Surfin’ U.S.A." uses a recognizable steady, upbeat drum tempo seen in many surf rock songs that seems to “drive” the music forward. The Beach Boys popularized this staccato drum style, and is reminiscent of “a locomotive getting up to speed”. This technique was seen earlier in Jan & Dean’s 1963 hit “Surf City”, which was the first Surf song to achieve the number one position on the Billboard Hot 100.

=== Authorship ===
When the single was released in 1963, the record only listed Brian Wilson as the composer although the song was published by Arc Music, Chuck Berry's publisher. Later releases, beginning with Best of The Beach Boys in 1966, listed Chuck Berry as the songwriter. Later releases list both writers although the copyright has always been owned, since 1963, by Arc Music. Under pressure from Berry's publisher, the Wilsons’ father and manager, Murry Wilson, had given the copyright, including Brian Wilson's lyrics, to Arc Music prior to the release of the single.

Despite tensions with Berry at the time, Carl Wilson said the Beach Boys "ran into Chuck Berry in Copenhagen and he told us he loves 'Surfin' U.S.A.'."

In 2015, Mike Love stated that "Surfin' U.S.A." was one of the Beach Boys songs he helped write but for which he did not receive credit. In his 2016 biography Good Vibrations: My Life as a Beach Boy, Love wrote, "A friend gave Brian the names of surfing spots in California and beyond, which he gave to me, and I modeled the lyrics to the melody, keeping the words in sync with the galloping track." In 1992, Love filed suit against Wilson for writing credit on 35 songs. In court, Love stated in regards to "Surfin' U.S.A.", "I took all the disparate words and assembled them in a coherent way so that they would rhyme and you could sing them. [...] There is part of the song that says, 'Haggerty's and Swami's', but I ran it together like [singing] 'At Hagerty's-and-Swami's-Pacific-Palisades, San-Onofre-and-Sunset, Redondo-Beach-L.A.'" Love claimed he did not receive credit for writing the song's lyrics in his successful lawsuit against Wilson and Almo/Irving Music in 1994 because the copyright was owned by Arc Music. In a 1974 radio interview, Brian said "When we first got going, Mike was a Chuck Berry fan, so ... he and I turned the lyrics into a surfing song".

=== Surfing spots ===
In the song the following surfing spots are mentioned, mostly in California, as well as one in Hawaii (possibly two) and one in Australia:

- "Del Mar" – Del Mar, San Diego County, California
- "Ventura County Line" – County Line Beach in Ventura County, California
- "Santa Cruz" – Santa Cruz, Santa Cruz County, California
- "Trestles" – San Onofre State Park, San Diego County, California
- "Australia's Narrabeen" – Narrabeen, Australia
- "Manhattan" – Manhattan Beach, Los Angeles County, California
- "Doheny" – Doheny Beach, Dana Point, Orange County, California
- "Haggerty's" – Palos Verdes Estates, Los Angeles County, California
- "Swami's" – Swami's Beach, Encinitas, San Diego County, California
- "Pacific Palisades" – Pacific Palisades, Los Angeles County, California
- "San Onofre" – San Onofre State Park, San Diego County, California
- "Sunset" – Sunset Beach, Oahu, Hawaii – or – Sunset Beach, Orange County, California [Could also be Sunset Blvd at PCH in LA County]
- "Redondo Beach, L.A." – Redondo Beach, Los Angeles County, California
- "La Jolla" – La Jolla, San Diego County, California
- "Waimea Bay" – Waimea Bay, Hawaii

== Reception ==
The "Surfin' U.S.A." single, backed with "Shut Down", was released under Capitol Records in the United States in March 1963. The song peaked on the Billboard pop chart at number three, the band's first top ten hit therein (see also Surfin' Safari). The B-side charted at number 23. Although the double-sided hit single registered in Billboard as number one in chart points at the end of the year (tabulated up to mid November 1963) and was cited by Billboard as "best-selling record of the year", in a low-selling year for singles in the US it apparently did not initially sell a million copies until it was certified double Platinum in 2026. The song was re-issued in the U.S. as a single in July 1974 backed with "The Warmth of the Sun". That single also hit the Billboard Hot 100 chart, peaking at #3 in May 25, 1963.

Writing in 2014, music historian Luis Sanchez highlighted the "Surfin' U.S.A." single as a turning point for the band, "creat[ing] a direct passage to California life for a wide teenage audience ... [and] a distinct Southern California sensibility that exceeded its conception as such to advance right to the front of American consciousness". Cash Box described it as "a pounding 'Sweet Little Sixteen'-flavored rocker...that the Beach Boys belt out with coin-catching enthusiasm" and added that it is a "terrific instrumental showcase."

In the United Kingdom, the single was released in June 1963. The third single by the band to be issued in the UK, it became the first single to chart. It peaked at 34 (28 in the New Musical Express). In Australia, the single was released in 1963 and peaked at 9, becoming the band's first single to chart in Australia. The single was re-released in Australia in 1974 and again charted, peaking at 66. In Canada and Sweden, the single was released in 1963 and peaked on the charts at 6 in both countries. In July 1963, in the national charts used by Billboard, it peaked at #9 in Hong Kong, #8 in Austria the following month; in August 1964 at #9 for two weeks in Japan.

== Variations ==
The song was first released on an album as the title track on the band's 1963 album Surfin' U.S.A. In May 2003 Capitol issued the song on an EP along with "Surfer Girl", "Don't Worry, Baby", and "The Beach Boys Medley". However, the record failed to make an impact on the charts.

A demo version of the song featuring only Brian Wilson singing and playing piano was released on the 1993 box set, Good Vibrations: Thirty Years of The Beach Boys. A different demo version, in which Wilson is joined by drums was released on the 2001 archival release Hawthorne, CA. Both demos feature similar minor lyrical differences from the final recording.

The instrumental track of the final recording was also released on the Hawthorne, CA album. This version of the cut does not 'fade out', but continues on well past the original ending of the song until it ends abruptly.

=== Live performances ===
After being released the song became a concert regular for the band. The band recorded live versions of "Surfin' U.S.A." on several Beach Boys albums. It was first released on The Beach Boys in Concert album. A concert from Anaheim Stadium on July 3, 1976, which featured the song was filmed and produced by Lorne Michaels for a Beach Boys television special which first aired in the United States in August 1976. The TV special was later released on VHS and DVD as Good Vibrations Tour. In 1980, a live rendition was recorded, though not released until 2002 on the Good Timin': Live at Knebworth England 1980 live album. Footage from the concert was also released on VHS and DVD format. A live version was also released on the band's 1993 box set Good Vibrations: Thirty Years of The Beach Boys.

The band also performed a live version of the song at the NBC Television Studios in Burbank, California, which was filmed on March 14, 1964. Footage of the concert was later released on the DVD The Lost Concert. The band performed the song on The T.A.M.I. Show which was filmed at the Santa Monica Civic Auditorium on October 28 and 29, 1964, and featured other top artists of the day such as Chuck Berry, Marvin Gaye, The Supremes, James Brown & The Famous Flames and The Rolling Stones. The concert was released as a film in 1964 featuring the Beach Boys performance. However, after the initial showing of the film Brian insisted that the band's performance be cut from the film. Because of a rights dispute the footage of the Beach Boys' performance does not appear in most versions of The T.A.M.I. Show. The footage was eventually released on the DVD Sights of Summer included with the special 2004 edition of Sounds of Summer: The Very Best of The Beach Boys.

== Personnel ==
According to Jon Stebbins:

The Beach Boys

- Mike Love – lead vocal
- David Marks – backing vocal, rhythm guitar
- Brian Wilson – backing vocal, bass guitar, organ
- Carl Wilson – backing vocal, lead guitar
- Dennis Wilson – backing vocal

Additional musicians

- Frank DeVito – drums

== Charts ==
Chart (1963)	Peak position
Canada (CHUM Hit Parade)	2
Japan Cash Box (foreign, 1964)	9
Japan Music Life	16
UK Singles (Official Charts)	34
US Billboard Hot 100	3
US Cash Box Top 100	3
US Hot R&B Singles (Billboard)	20

Chart (1974)	Peak position
Australian Singles Chart	66
Canada Top Singles (RPM)	35

== Certifications ==
Region	Certification	Certified units/sales
Italy (FIMI) Beach Boys version/sales since 2009	Gold	50,000^{‡}
New Zealand (RMNZ) Beach Boys version	Platinum	30,000^{‡}
United Kingdom (BPI) Beach Boys version	Gold	400,000^{‡}
United States (RIAA)	2× Platinum	2,000,000^{‡}
^{‡} Sales+streaming figures based on certification alone.

== Leif Garrett version ==
"Surfin' USA"

Single by Leif Garrett

from the album Leif Garrett
- B-side: "Special Kind of Girl"
- Released: August 1977
- Recorded: 1977
- Studio: Atlantic Studios (New York City, New York)
- Genre: Surf rock; pop
- Label: Atlantic
- Songwriter: Chuck Berry
- Producer: Michael Lloyd

Leif Garrett singles chronology
"Come Back When You Grow Up" (1977)	"Surfin' USA" (1977)	"Runaround Sue" (1977)

In August 1977, Leif Garrett released his version as the first single from his eponymous debut album. It reached No. 20 on the Billboard Hot 100 and No. 4 in Switzerland.

Chart (1977)	Peak position
Australia (Kent Music Report)	2
Canada Top Singles (RPM)	32
Canada Adult Contemporary (RPM)	48
US Billboard Hot 100	20
US Cash Box Top 100	29
West Germany (GfK)	6

== Sources ==
Bibliography

- Love, Mike; Hirsch, James S. (2016). Good Vibrations: My Life as a Beach Boy. Blue Rider Press. ISBN 978-0-399-17641-8.
