= Surfin' U.S.A. (album) =

Studio album by the Beach Boys
- Released: March 25, 1963
- Recorded: June 13, 1962; January 5 – February 12, 1963
- Studios: Capitol (Hollywood); Western (Hollywood)
- Genre: Surf rock
- Length: 24:15
- Label: Capitol
- Producer: Nick Venet

The Beach Boys chronology
Surfin' Safari (1962)	Surfin' U.S.A. (1963)	Surfer Girl (1963)

The Beach Boys UK chronology
All Summer Long (1965)	Surfin' U.S.A. (1965)	Little Deuce Coupe (1965)

Singles from Surfin' U.S.A.
- 1. "Surfin' U.S.A." / "Shut Down" Released: March 4, 1963

Surfin' U.S.A. is the second studio album by the American rock band the Beach Boys, released March 25, 1963 on Capitol Records. It reached number 2 in the US during a chart stay of 78 weeks, eventually being certified gold by the RIAA, and brought the group newfound national success. It was led by one single, its title track with the B-side "Shut Down". In the UK, the album was released in late 1965 and reached number 17.

The majority of the album's recording commenced in the first week of 1963, three months after the release of Surfin' Safari. Like the group's debut album, production was credited ostensibly to Capitol's representative for Artists and Repertoire, Nick Venet, although bandleader Brian Wilson was heavily involved in the album's composition. The album marks the beginning of his practice to doubletrack vocals, resulting in a fuller sound. It is also the band’s only album not to feature any contributions of founding member Al Jardine.

== Background ==
In 1990, Brian Wilson reflected on Surfin' U.S.A. in liner notes which accompanied its first CD issue:

By the time I got to the album, Surfin’ USA, I was more experienced at producing. The album Surfin' Safari was practice for me. ... This album showcased our voices. We were just kids, but we were serious about our craft. The point being that when you are given the chance, you do your best. ... I think that I was a good coach for the boys. I didn’t like second-rate vocals. It was either the best or nothin’, in my opinion. The boys picked up. We had a good understanding between us and I was their leader. We got it done relatively fast in the studio. ... On this album, we had gotten into a fast pace: almost athletic in nature. It was because "Surfin’ USA" was such a smash hit on the radio. It was the big time for us. ... Production-wise, this album was an early Brian Wilson production.

== Reception ==
Professional ratings
Retrospective reviews
Review scores
Source	Rating
AllMusic	4/5 stars
Blender	3/5 stars
Encyclopedia of Popular Music	3/5 stars
Record Mirror	3/5 stars
The Rolling Stone Album Guide	3/5 stars

In a retrospective review, Richie Unterberger wrote: "The album as a whole is the best they would make, prior to the late '60s, as a band that played most of their instruments, rather than as a vehicle for Brian Wilson's ideas. The LP was a huge hit, vital to launching surf music as a national craze, and one of the few truly strong records to be recorded by a self-contained American rock band prior to the British Invasion." Author Luis Sanchez summarized the album's impact on culture and the image it established for the Beach Boys:

If Surfin' U.S.A. didn't literally transform America into an endless beach, it added vivid dimension to California mythos and took it further than anyone would have thought. You could call The Beach Boys’ version of Southern California cutesy or callow or whatever, but what matters is that it captured a lack of self-consciousness—a genuineness—that set them apart from their peers. And it was this quality that came to define Brian’s oeuvre as he moved beyond and into bigger pop productions that would culminate in Smile.

== Track listing ==
Side one
No.	Title	Writer(s)	Lead vocal	Length
1.	"Surfin' U.S.A."	Brian Wilson; Chuck Berry	Mike Love	2:29
2.	"Farmer's Daughter"	B. Wilson; Love	B. Wilson	1:49
3.	"Misirlou"	Nick Roubanis; Fred Wise; Milton Leeds; Bob Russell	instrumental	2:03
4.	"Stoked"	B. Wilson	instrumental	1:59
5.	"Lonely Sea"	B. Wilson; Gary Usher	B. Wilson	2:21
6.	"Shut Down"	B. Wilson; Roger Christian	Love	1:49

Side two
No.	Title	Writer(s)	Lead vocal	Length
1.	"Noble Surfer"	B. Wilson; Love	Love	1:51
2.	"Honky Tonk"	Bill Doggett; Shep Sheperd; Clifford Scott; Billy Butler	instrumental	2:01
3.	"Lana"	B. Wilson	B. Wilson	1:39
4.	"Surf Jam"	Carl Wilson	instrumental	2:10
5.	"Let's Go Trippin'"	Dick Dale	instrumental	1:57
6.	"Finders Keepers"	B. Wilson; Love	Love	1:38
Total length:				24:15

Surfin' Safari / Surfin' U.S.A. 1990/2001 CD reissue bonus tracks
No.	Title	Writer(s)	Lead vocal	Length
25.	"Cindy, Oh Cindy"	Robert Barron; Burt Long	B. Wilson	2:10
26.	"The Baker Man"	B. Wilson	B. Wilson	2:37
27.	"Land Ahoy"	B. Wilson	Love	1:38
Total length:				30:40

Notes

- Mike Love was not originally credited for any of the tracks on the album. His credits for "Farmer's Daughter", "Noble Surfer", and "Finders Keepers" were awarded after a 1994 court case.
- Some later reissues of the album omit "Stoked" and "Surf Jam".

== Personnel ==
Partial credits compiled from the original album liner notes plus additional information from David Leaf, Jon Stebbins, and James Murphy.

The Beach Boys

- Mike Love – vocals; saxophone on "Surf Jam" and "Shut Down"
- Brian Wilson – vocals; electric bass, organ on "Surfin' U.S.A.", additional production (uncredited)
- Carl Wilson – vocals; electric lead guitar
- Dennis Wilson – vocals; drums (except "Surfin' U.S.A.")
- David Marks – vocals; rhythm guitar

Additional musicians and production staff

- Frank DeVito – drums on "Surfin' U.S.A."
- Nick Venet – producer

== Charts ==
Year	Chart	Position
1963	Canada CHUM Chart	1
1963	US Billboard 200	2
1965	UK Top 40 Albums	17
