= 409 (song) =

1962 single by The Beach Boys

Single by the Beach Boys

from the album Surfin' Safari and Little Deuce Coupe
- A-side: "Surfin' Safari"
- Released: June 4, 1962
- Recorded: April 19, 1962
- Studio: Western Studios, Los Angeles, California
- Genre: Hot rod rock; car song
- Length: 1:59
- Label: Capitol
- Songwriters: Brian Wilson; Mike Love; Gary Usher
- Producer: Murry Wilson

The Beach Boys singles chronology
"Surfin'" (1961)	"409" (1962)	"Ten Little Indians" (1962)

"409" is a song written by Brian Wilson, Mike Love, and Gary Usher for the American rock and roll band the Beach Boys. The song features Love singing lead vocals. It was originally released as the B-side of the single "Surfin' Safari" (1962). It was later released on their 1962 album Surfin' Safari, and appeared again on their 1963 album Little Deuce Coupe.

The song is credited for initiating the hot rod music craze of the 1960s.

== Composition ==
"409" was inspired by Gary Usher's obsession with hot rods. Its title refers to a 1962 Chevrolet Impala fitted with Chevrolet's 409-cubic-inch-displacement "big block" V-8 engine. The song's narrator concludes with the description "My four speed, dual-quad, positraction four-oh-nine." This version of the engine – at 409 hp, achieving 1 hp per cubic inch – featured twin "D" series Carter AFB (Aluminum Four Barrel) carburetors ("dual-quads"). It was offered in new vehicles (Impala SS; Bel Air; Biscayne) and as replacement units in the 1962 model year.

It stayed one week on the Billboard Hot 100, at number 76, in October 1962.

== Personnel ==
- Mike Love – lead vocals
- David Marks – rhythm guitar, background vocals
- Brian Wilson – bass guitar, background vocals, car sound effects tape
- Carl Wilson – lead guitar, background vocals
- Dennis Wilson – drums, background vocals
