= Surfin' Safari =

Studio album by the Beach Boys
- Released: October 1, 1962
- Recorded: November 1961; April 19, August 8, September 5–6, 1962
- Studios: Capitol (Hollywood); World Pacific (Los Angeles); Western (Los Angeles)
- Genre: Garage surf
- Length: 24:49
- Label: Capitol
- Producer: Nick Venet

The Beach Boys chronology
Surfin' Safari (1962)	Surfin' U.S.A. (1963)

The Beach Boys UK chronology
Surfin' Safari (1963)	Shut Down Volume 2 (1964)

Singles from Surfin' Safari
- 1. "Surfin'" Released: November 27, 1961; 2. "Surfin' Safari" / "409" Released: June 4, 1962; 3. "Ten Little Indians" / "County Fair" Released: November 26, 1962

Surfin' Safari is the debut studio album by the American rock band the Beach Boys, released on October 1, 1962, by Capitol Records. The official production credit went to Nick Venet, though it was Brian Wilson with his father Murry who contributed substantially to the album's production; Brian also wrote or co-wrote nine of its 12 tracks. The album reached number 32 in the US during a chart stay of 37 weeks.

The album was preceded by two singles: "Surfin'" and "Surfin' Safari", which charted at numbers 75 and 14, respectively. The success of "Surfin' Safari" helped secure a full album for the group while an additional single, "Ten Little Indians," was issued, charting at number 49.

== Background ==
The group is mainly comprised of people from Hawthorne, California, named Wilson … there's Brian, Dennis, Carl, and their Dad, Murry Wilson, a long-time songwriter who acts as manager for the outfit. Then there's the boys' talented cousin, Mike Love … who sings both the lead tenor and deep bass parts in their unusual vocal arrangements. … [and] young David Marks, a neighbor of the Wilsons who plays a driving rhythm guitar. Brian, the oldest of the Wilson boys, is the group's leader and vocal arranger. Carl is the very accomplished lead guitarist, while brother Dennis sings and plays the drums. None of them, incidentally, had any formal training, but they all grew up in an atmosphere where music was a regular part of their lives.

— excerpt taken from the album's original liner notes

In November 1961, the Beach Boys, then calling themselves the Pendletones, recorded their first single, "Surfin'", for producer Hite Morgan at World Pacific Studios. Candix Records picked up the single for distribution, and released it on the 27th. The record was a top ten hit on stations KRLA and KFWB, and reached number 75 on the Billboard Hot 100 in March 1962. In April, the Beach Boys recorded the tracks "Surfin' Safari", "409", and "Lonely Sea" at Western Recorders. "Lonely Sea" would appear on the group's second album, Surfin' U.S.A.. Producer Nick Venet of Capitol Records showed interest in the group's recordings. In May 1962, Capitol purchased the masters to all three songs from Murry Wilson, who signed two interim contracts "on behalf of the group". The Beach Boys would officially sign with Capitol on July 16. The "Surfin' Safari" was released as a single on June 4, with "409" as the B-side. Within a month of its release, Capitol wanted the group to record an album. In October, the single peaked at number 14 on the Billboard Hot 100.

== Production ==
Recording sessions for Surfin' Safari took place in Capitol's basement studios in the famous tower building in August. During the sessions, Brian Wilson fought for, and won, the right to helm the production – though this fact was not acknowledged with an album liner notes production credit. David Marks remembered, "Brian did everything. Played, did the arrangements, screwed up the lead sheets himself. He didn't need any help to do that. You listen to those first albums and they sound campy and corny but Brian was dead serious." According to James B. Murphy, Capitol leased the "Surfin'" recording from Hite Morgan for the album, where it was presented at a slightly faster speed.

"Land Ahoy", written by Brian Wilson, was recorded during sessions for the album, but went unreleased until 1983, when a stereo version appeared on the Beach Boys' Rarities compilation album.

== Songs ==
=== Side one ===
"County Fair" was inspired by Gary Usher and Brian Wilson visiting a county fair in San Bernardino. The song was written in about ten minutes. "Ten Little Indians" saw the group trying to emulate the style of the song "Running Bear". "Little Miss America" features a doo-wop style, and according to biographer David Leaf, is about "the ideal southern California dream girl".

In "Chug-a-Lug", written by Brian and Usher, the lyrics refer to Usher, Marks, Carl, and Dennis, as well as a Larry. The latter was possibly Larry Lennear, a saxophonist who played and recorded with Brian at the time. "409" was written about Usher's obsession over hot-rods. The car sound effects were recorded by Usher driving his car past the home of the Wilsons, who had set up a tape recorder outside using a 100-foot extension cord.

=== Side two ===
Brian stated that the song "Surfin'" was composed after Dennis told him "surfing's getting really big. You guys ought to write a song about it." "Heads You Win, Tails I Lose" was written because of Usher and Brian Wilson's frequent use of coin flipping to decide things. The group wanted to make contemporary expressions into songs.

The instrumental "Moon Dawg", originally performed by the Gamblers, was considered the first surf record. The Beach Boys became the first group to cover the song, exposing it to a much wider audience. "The Shift" was presented as a "fashion statement" from Brian and Love.

== Release and reception ==
Retrospective professional ratings
Review scores
Source	Rating
AllMusic	2/5 stars
Blender	3/5 stars
The Encyclopedia of Popular Music	2/5 stars
The Rolling Stone Album Guide	3/5 stars

Capitol released Surfin' Safari on October 1, 1962. The album was released in mono, with a Duophonic release following on November 12. Capitol later issued the Duophonic version in "Capitol Full Dimensional Stereo"-branded jackets. The album peaked at number 32 on the Billboard Top LPs chart.

The track "Surfin'" was later credited with creating the genre of California Sound, a music aesthetic primarily revolving around surfing, hot rod culture, and youthful innocence. "409" was similarly credited with starting the hot rod music craze of the 1960s. According to Usher, Capitol chose "Ten Little Indians" from the album as a single due to thinking that surf music was a fad.

Richie Unterberger, in a retrospective review for AllMusic, felt that most of the songs on Surfin' Safari are substandard, but that as the album was recorded by the Beach Boys themselves rather than session musicians, it offered an opportunity to hear what the band sounded like in the studio.

== Track listing ==
Side one
No.	Title	Writer(s)	Lead vocals	Length
1.	"Surfin' Safari"	Brian Wilson; Mike Love	Love	2:06
2.	"County Fair"	B. Wilson; Gary Usher	Love	2:16
3.	"Ten Little Indians"	B. Wilson; Usher	Love	1:29
4.	"Chug-A-Lug"	B. Wilson; Usher; Love	Love	2:00
5.	"Little Girl (You're My Miss America)"	Herb Alpert; Vincent Catalano	D. Wilson	2:06
6.	"409"	B. Wilson; Usher; Love	Love	2:00

Side two
No.	Title	Writer(s)	Lead vocals	Length
1.	"Surfin'"	B. Wilson; Love	Love	2:12
2.	"Heads You Win–Tails I Lose"	B. Wilson; Usher	Love	2:19
3.	"Summertime Blues"	Eddie Cochran; Jerry Capehart	Carl Wilson; David Marks (debated)	2:11
4.	"Cuckoo Clock"	B. Wilson; Usher	B. Wilson	2:11
5.	"Moon Dawg"	Derry Weaver	instrumental	2:03
6.	"The Shift"	Wilson; Love	Love	1:56
Total length:				24:49

Surfin' Safari / Surfin' U.S.A. 1990/2001 CD reissue bonus tracks
No.	Title	Writer(s)	Lead vocals	Length
13.	"Cindy, Oh Cindy"	Robert Barron; Burt Long	B. Wilson	2:10
14.	"The Baker Man"	B. Wilson	B. Wilson	2:37
15.	"Land Ahoy"	B. Wilson	Love	1:38
Total length:				31:14

Notes

- Mike Love was not originally credited for "Chug-A-Lug" and "409". His credits were awarded after a 1994 court case.
- Some reissue pressings omit "Surfin'" and "Cuckoo Clock", and move "Chug-A-Lug" to the beginning of side two.

== Personnel ==
Partial credits compiled from the original album liner notes plus additional information from David Leaf, Jon Stebbins, and James Murphy.

The Beach Boys

- Mike Love – vocals; saxophone on "Ten Little Indians"
- Brian Wilson – vocals; electric bass (except "Surfin'"), organ on “Cuckoo Clock”, snare drum tapped with pencil on "Surfin'", additional production (uncredited)
- Carl Wilson – vocals; electric lead guitar (except "Surfin'"), acoustic guitar on "Surfin'"
- Dennis Wilson – vocals; drums (except "Surfin'")
- David Marks – vocals and rhythm guitar (except "Surfin'")
- Al Jardine – vocals and double bass on "Surfin'"

Additional musicians and production staff

- Gary Usher – car sound effects on "409"
- Nick Venet – producer
- Murry Wilson – additional production (uncredited)

== Charts ==
Year	Chart	Position
1963	US Billboard 200	32
