= Surfin' Safari (song) =

- U.S. picture sleeve

Single by the Beach Boys

from the album Surfin' Safari
- B-side: "409"
- Released: June 4, 1962
- Recorded: April 19, 1962
- Studio: Western, Hollywood
- Genre: Surf rock; pop
- Length: 2:05
- Label: Capitol
- Songwriters: Brian Wilson; Mike Love
- Producer: Murry Wilson

The Beach Boys singles chronology
| "Surfin'" (1961) | "Surfin' Safari" (1962) | "Ten Little Indians" (1962) |

Licensed audio
- "Surfin' Safari" on YouTube

"Surfin' Safari" is a song by the American rock band the Beach Boys, written by Brian Wilson and Mike Love. Released as a single with "409" on June 4, 1962, it peaked at No. 14 on the Billboard Hot 100. The song also appeared on the 1962 album of the same name.

== Background ==
The song was inspired by Chuck Berry's method of combining simple chord progressions with lyrical references to place names (for example, in "Back in the U.S.A." and "Sweet Little Sixteen"). "Surfin' Safari" includes several references to Southern California surfing locations (Malibu, Rincon, the Channel Islands, Huntington, and Sunset Beach). It also references Narrabeen, a beach on Australia's east coast. The sites and surfing-related terms featured in the song were provided to Brian and Mike by surfer Jimmy Bowles, brother of Brian's then-new flame Judy Bowles, who he had met one afternoon while helping a buddy coach little league.

Wilson referred to "Surfin' Safari" as "a silly song with a simple-but-cool C-F-G chord pattern that I came up with one day while trying to play the piano the way Chuck Berry played his guitar."

"Surfin' Safari" was the first recording to display the distinctive counterpoint harmonies for which the group became famous.

== Recording ==
The Beach Boys first recorded the song at World Pacific Studios on February 8, 1962, in what was the band's second ever recording session, along with an early version of "Surfer Girl", the instrumental "Karate", and "Judy". However, the recordings from that session, produced by Hite and Dorinda Morgan, remained unreleased until 1969, when they were released on the compilation album The Beach Boys Biggest Beach Hits. Alan Jardine participated in the session before briefly leaving the group; his name was subsequently crossed out of the AFM paperwork for the session.

The second version of "Surfin' Safari" was recorded at Western Recorders in April 1962. According to James B. Murphy, no documentation is known to exist for the oft-cited date of April 19. The session, produced by Brian, featured David Marks and Carl Wilson on guitar; Brian Wilson on bass guitar and Dennis Wilson on drums. The song features Mike Love on lead vocals with backing vocals by Brian, Carl and Dennis Wilson. Also recorded during that session were "409" and "Lonely Sea". The masters, among other recordings by the group, were part of a package Murry Wilson sent to Nick Venet at Capitol Records. The label was impressed and purchased the masters to all three songs recorded at Western in May. The label officially signed the band to their first major label contract in July. "Surfin' Safari" and "409" would be the band's first single to be issued under Capitol Records.

== Release and reception ==
"The beach scene gets a rolling, rocking treatment on this side by the boys. Tune swings along neatly on lead singer's talent and support of the rest of the group. "
★★★★ (strong sales potential)

— Review of "Surfin' Safari" for Billboard, June 9, 1962.

The "Surfin' Safari" single backed with "409" was the band's second single and the first single to be released on the band's new label Capitol Records in the United States in June 1962. Murry Wilson claimed that Nick Venet wanted "409" to be the A-side of the single, which Venet disputed. Murphy noted that Capitol's original work order for the single "indicates "Surfin' Safari" was the A side." The Billboard issue of July 14, 1962 cited Detroit as the major market of its national "break out".

The single peaked at the No. 14 position on the Billboard Hot 100 chart, with "409" also charting at No. 76, making it the band's first double-sided hit single. It placed at No. 10 on the Cash Box sales chart, and No. 5 on UPI's national weekly survey used by newspapers. According to English pop music statistician Joseph Murrells in The Book of Golden Discs, 1978 edition, it placed number 3 on one of the four major national charts then recognised, probably Variety. Certainly its regional sales backed up these higher placings (than Billboard). As well as its Capitol-record sales in New York, it was No. 1 in Los Angeles, San Diego, Dallas, Minneapolis, Buffalo and Hartford; and top five in Chicago, San Francisco, Phoenix, Tucson, Nashville, Cincinnati, Columbus, Dayton, Springfield MA.

Capitol A&R executive Nick Venet, who signed the group and is listed as producer on their first two albums, is quoted in the Steven Gaines book as saying regarding the release that "The biggest order Capitol had from a single market all year [1962] was from New York City - where there was no surfing. It sold approximately nine hundred thousand records, but not enough for a gold."

In October 1962, the "Surfin' Safari" single was the first to be released by the band in the UK. However, given mediocre reviews at best, the single failed to make any impact on the charts. It did qualify as the Beach Boys' first international chart-topper, however. By the end of September it had peaked at number seven in Australia's Music Maker chart — only reaching the Billboard top 20 the following week — then in November spent three weeks at number one in Sweden (both charts cited by contemporary issues of Billboard). In Germany, the World Pacific Studios recording of the song was issued by Ariola Records as a single in 1962.

In January 1970, the World Pacific Studios sessions recording of the song was issued on Trip Records as the B-side of a "Surfin'" single re-issue. The single however failed to make any impact on the charts.

== Album and alternate releases ==
The song was first released on a single 45 RPM record and then later, it was released on the band's debut Surfin' Safari album, and on a number of later 'greatest hits' compilations. The song's appearance on the 1993 Good Vibrations box set is sourced from the original demo tape master, lacking the fade-out added before its release as a single.

Three takes of the early World Pacific Studios recordings of the song were eventually released on CD in 1991 on the archival release Lost & Found (1961-62) as well as subsequent re-issues of that album which featured alternate album titles. A live concert performance of the tune "Surfin' Safari" is featured in the short documentary "One Man's Challenge", written and directed by Dale Smallin. Filmed July 27, 1962 (with the same lineup as the official Capitol single) at the Azuza Teen Club, this particular visual version of the song is, according to author Jon Stebbins in The Lost Beach Boy, "The only known performance footage of the Pendleton-shirt era Beach Boys."

== Personnel ==
- Mike Love – lead and backing vocals
- Brian Wilson – backing vocals; bass guitar
- Dennis Wilson – backing vocals; drums
- Carl Wilson – backing vocals; lead guitar
- David Marks – backing vocals; rhythm guitar

== Other versions ==
Jan & Dean, with uncredited instrumental and vocal support from the Beach Boys, recorded the song for their 1963 album Jan and Dean Take Linda Surfin'. The song was also recorded by the Hot Doggers (a studio-only group headed by future Beach Boy Bruce Johnston along with Terry Melcher) on their 1963 album Surfin' U.S.A., by the Challengers on their 1963 album Surfbeat, and by the Lively Ones on their 1963 album The Great Surf Hits!. More recently it has been recorded by the Ramones on their 1993 album Acid Eaters and by Rockapella on their 2002 album Smilin'. Mike Love re-recorded the song for his 2019 album 12 Sides of Summer.

== Charts ==
| Chart (1962) | Peak position |
|---|---|
| Australia (Music Maker) | 7 |
| Sweden (Kvällstoppen) | 1 |
| Sweden (Tio i Topp) | 1 |
| US Billboard Hot 100 | 14 |
| US Cash Box Top 100 | 10 |

== Certifications ==
Certifications for "Surfin' Safari"
| Region | Certification | Certified units/sales |
|---|---|---|
| United States (RIAA) | Gold | 500,000^{‡} |
^{^} Shipments figures based on certification alone.^{‡} Sales+streaming figures based on certification alone.

== In popular culture ==
- The Beach Boys' recording of "Surfin' Safari" was featured in the soundtrack of the 1973 film American Graffiti.
- The Beach Boys' recording of "Surfin' Safari" was featured in season 2 episode 11, "‘Twas the Nightmare Before Christmas", of The Golden Girls.
- The Beach Boys' recording of "Surfin' Safari" was featured in the 1987 teen romantic comedy, Can't Buy Me Love.
- The song was covered by Alvin and the Chipmunks for their 1990 TV special Rockin' Through the Decades and its soundtrack.
- This song was sung in the 1995 Disney Sing Along Songs home video, Mickey's Fun Songs: Beach Party at Walt Disney World.
