= Gary Usher =

American musician and record producer (1938–1990)

- Born: Gary Lee Usher; December 14, 1938; Los Angeles, California, United States
- Died: May 25, 1990 (aged 51) Los Angeles, California, United States
- Genres: Rock and roll; surf
- Occupations: Songwriter, record producer
- Years active: 1960s–1990
- Labels: Capitol; Columbia; Together; Lan-Cet
- Website: garyusher.com

Gary Lee Usher (December 14, 1938 – May 25, 1990) was an American rock musician, songwriter, and record producer, who worked with numerous California acts in the 1960s, including the Byrds, the Beach Boys, and Dick Dale. Usher also produced fictitious surf groups or hot rod groups, mixing studio session musicians with his own associates (including Chuck Girard and Dick Burns). These bands included the Super Stocks, the Kickstands, the Hondells with their No. 9 US pop single "Little Honda", and Sagittarius.

== Career ==
In 1961, Usher recorded the single "Driven Insane" for Titan. While promoting the single, he met future collaborator and KFWB DJ Roger Christian. Later that year, Usher recorded the single "Tomorrow" for Lan-Cet. The single received a cursory mention in Billboard Music Week, where it appeared in its "Limited Sales Potential" section. In January 1962, Usher met Brian Wilson and began writing songs with him. In 1963, Usher recorded the single "Three Surfer Boys" with the Honeys, who were credited as the Usherettes.

In December 1964, Usher was hired by Decca Records as an A&R producer. While at the label, Usher produced the Surfaris, the Castells, and the Sons of Adam. In 1966, Usher became an independent producer, while continuing to work with the label. In November 1966, Usher was hired by Columbia Records as West Coast A&R producer.

In 1969, Usher co-founded Together Records with Curt Boettcher and Keith Olsen. The label was distributed by Forward Records. Together planned to release an archival series of albums containing music from West Coast groups. The Byrds' album Preflyte, containing early material from the group, was to be first in the series. In 1970, Usher joined RCA Records, where he served as vice president of its rock music division. He departed the company in early 1971.

=== Collaborations with Brian Wilson ===
In 2006, Wilson said, "Gary taught me how to really get into songwriting, to really involve myself in it." Wilson and Usher co-wrote six songs on the Beach Boys' first album, Surfin' Safari (1962), including "409" (with Mike Love) and "Ten Little Indians". Usher provided the car sound effects featured in "409", by driving his Chevrolet outside Wilson's house. That year, the duo also co-wrote "The Revo-Lution" for Rachel and the Revolvers, and its B-side, "Number One". The latter song had been recorded by the Beach Boys as "Visions" at a demo session in April 1962.

"Lonely Sea", the first song written by the pair, appeared on the Beach Boys' second album, Surfin' U.S.A. (1963). Later that year, Wilson and Usher wrote "In My Room", which appeared on the group's Surfer Girl album.

In 1964, Wilson and Usher co-wrote Usher's single "Sacramento", the Beach Boys' "We'll Run Away", which appeared on All Summer Long, and the Hondells' "My Buddy Seat", which was the last song they co-wrote for two decades.

In 1986, Wilson reunited with Usher for a brief period, when David Leaf brought them together to collaborate with each other. Wilson's psychologist Eugene Landy frequently interfered with Wilson and Usher's work, which was described by author Peter Doggett as a "turbulent ten-month partnership". In February 1987, an Associated Press article stated that Usher was co-writing songs for Wilson's first solo album. Wilson said, "We usually work and toss it over to Gene who ends up deciding the direction we're going in. We don't have any generalized rules or limitations or deadlines. We work slow." The duo co-wrote 17 songs, of which one saw contemporary release. "Let's Go to Heaven in My Car", performed by Wilson, appeared on the Police Academy 4: Citizens on Patrol soundtrack, and was released as a single in April of that year. It received a Razzie nomination for Worst Original Song. "The Spirit of Rock & Roll" (co-written with Tom Kelly) appeared in the TV special The Beach Boys: 25 Years Together, which had aired a month earlier, but the song was not released in any form until 2006, when a newly-recorded solo version by Wilson appeared on the Beach Boys compilation album Songs from Here & Back.

=== Production work ===
In 1963, Usher and Nick Venet co-produced the compilation album Shut Down for Capitol Records. The album reached number seven on the Billboard Top LPs chart. Following the success of the album, Capitol had the Beach Boys record an album of original songs titled Shut Down Volume 2.

=== Studio groups ===
==== The Hondells ====
Usher produced the Hondells' rendition of the Beach Boys' "Little Honda", which reached number 9 on the Billboard Hot 100.

==== Sagittarius ====
While at Columbia, Usher offered "My World Fell Down" to Chad & Jeremy, who rejected the track. Usher decided to record the song himself using session musicians, with Bruce Johnston, Terry Melcher, and Glen Campbell providing vocals. Usher presented the recording to Columbia head Clive Davis as by a group named Sagittarius. The single charted at number 70 on the Billboard Hot 100. Sagittarius subsequently recorded two albums.

In 1969, Usher was credited as a featured artist on the group's "I Guess the Lord Must Be in New York City", which reached number 135 on Billboard's Bubbling Under the Hot 100 chart.

=== Other work ===
Usher and Christian co-wrote three songs for the 1963 film Beach Party, including its title theme, performed by Annette Funicello and Frankie Avalon. Usher, Wilson, and Christian co-wrote six songs for Muscle Beach Party (1964). In 1965, Usher scored The Girls on the Beach and Ski Party.

== Death ==
Usher died of lung cancer at his home in his hometown of Los Angeles, California, on May 25, 1990, at the age of 51. He was survived by his wife Sue, three sons and a daughter.

== Selected discography ==
=== Production ===
- Shut Down (1963, Various Artists)
- Hits of the Street and Strip (1963, The Competitors)
- Hot Rod City (1963, The Quads, The Grand Prix, The Customs)
- The New Sounds of the Weird-Ohs (1964, The Weird-Ohs)
- Hot Rod Hootenanny (1964, Mr. Gasser & the Weirdos)
- Rods & Ratfinks (1964, Mr. Gasser & the Weirdos)
- Surfink (1964, Mr. Gasser & the Weirdos)
- Competition Coupe (1964, The Astronauts)
- Thunder Road (1964, The Super Stocks)
- Surf Route 101 (1964, The Super Stocks)
- School Is A Drag (1964, The Super Stocks)
- Go Little Honda (1964, The Hondells)
- The New Mustang and Other Hot Rod Hits (1964, The Road Runners)
- The New Sounds of the Silly Surfers (1964, The Silly Surfers)
- The New Sounds of the Weird-Ohs (1964, The Weird-Ohs)
- Draculas' Deuce (1964, The Ghouls)
- Music to Make Models By (1964, The Silly Surfers/ The Weird-Ohs)
- The New Sounds of the Weird-Ohs (1964, The Weird-Ohs)
- Hit City '65 (1965, The Surfaris)
- It Ain't Me, Babe (1965, The Surfaris)
- Go Sound of the Slots (1965, The Revells)
- In Action (1966, Keith Allison)
- An Esoteric Qabalistic Service (1966, Rev. Ann Davies with the Builders of the Adytum Choir)
- Gene Clark with the Gosdin Brothers (1967, Gene Clark)
- Younger Than Yesterday (1967, The Byrds)
- The Peanut Butter Conspiracy Is Spreading (1967, The Peanut Butter Conspiracy)
- Of Cabbages and Kings (1967, Chad & Jeremy)
- The Great Conspiracy (1967, The Peanut Butter Conspiracy)
- Present Tense (1968, Sagittarius)
- The Ark (1968, Chad & Jeremy)
- The Notorious Byrd Brothers (1968, The Byrds)
- Waiting for the Electrician or Someone Like Him (1968, The Firesign Theatre)
- Sweetheart of the Rodeo (1968, The Byrds)
- Wackering Heights (1972, The Wackers)
- Going Public (1977, Bruce Johnston)
- Sanctuary (1984, Celestium)

=== Charting singles written by Usher ===
Year	Song	Original artist	Co-writers	^{US}	Other charting versions	Ref.
1962	"409"	The Beach Boys	Brian Wilson	76		
1962	"Ten Little Indians"	The Beach Boys	Brian Wilson	49		
1963	"In My Room"	The Beach Boys	Brian Wilson	23	Sagittarius (1969, #86)	
1964	"Competition Coupe"	The Astronauts	Roger Christian	124		
1964	"My Buddy Seat"	The Hondells	Brian Wilson	87		
1965	"Comin' On Too Strong"	Wayne Newton	Raul Abeyta	65		
1965	"It Hurts Me"	Bobby Sherman	Raul Abeyta	118		
1969	"Don't Give In to Him"	Gary Puckett & The Union Gap		15		
