= David Marks =

American guitarist (born 1948)

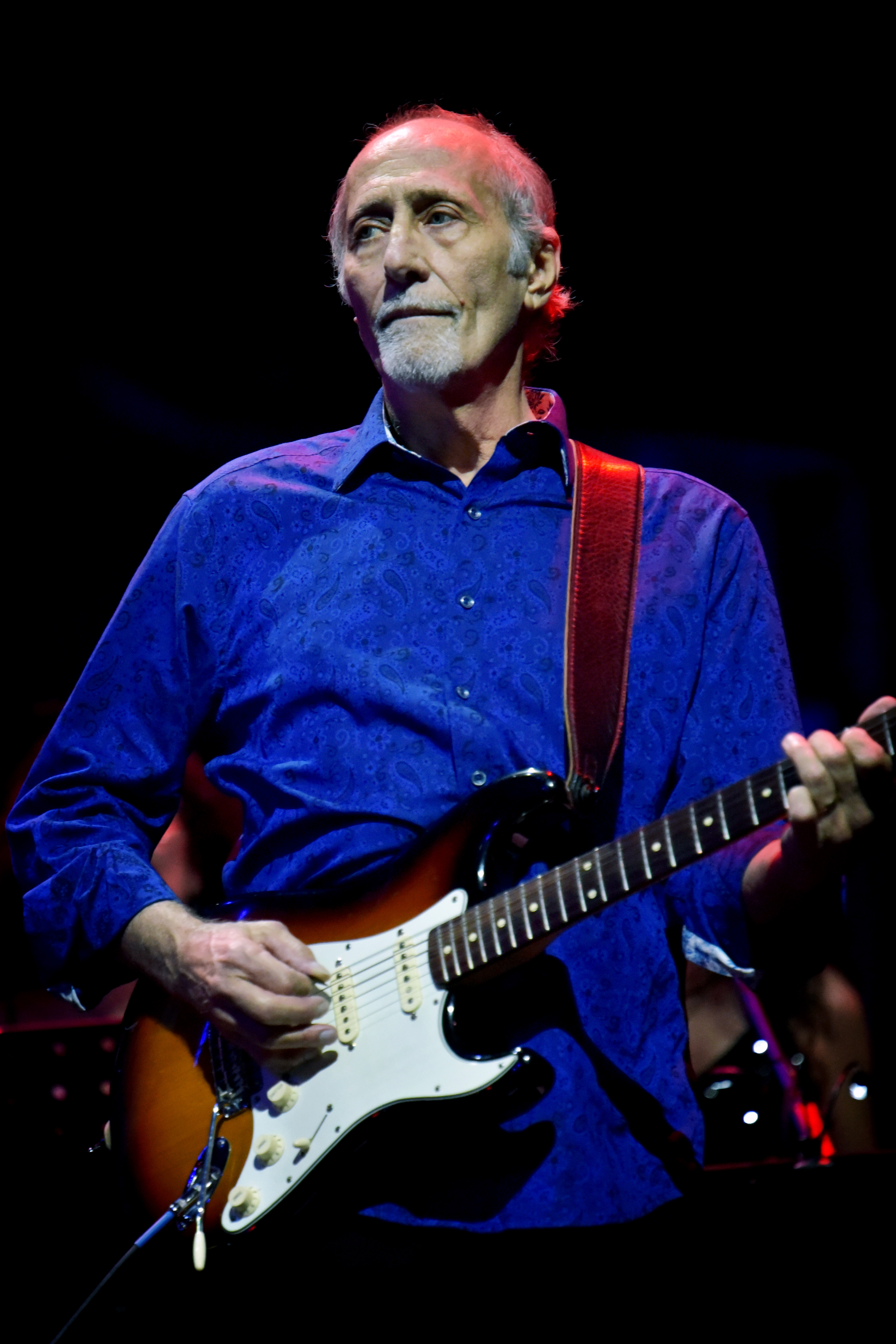
- Marks performing for the California Saga 2 Charity Concert in Los Angeles, 2019

Background information
- Born: David Lee Marks; August 22, 1948 (age 78)
- Origin: New Castle, Pennsylvania, U.S.
- Genres: Rock; pop; surf
- Occupations: Musician; singer; songwriter
- Instruments: Guitar; vocals
- Years active: 1962–present
- Formerly of: The Beach Boys; Brian Wilson Band; David & the Marksmen; The Moon; California Music; Delaney & Bonnie and Friends

David Lee Marks (born August 22, 1948) is an American guitarist who was an early and latter-era member of the Beach Boys. While growing up in Hawthorne, California, Marks was a neighborhood friend of the original band members and was a frequent participant at their family get-togethers. He did not perform on their debut record "Surfin'" (1961), leading many historians to discount him as a founding member. When Al Jardine left the group in February 1962, Marks joined and played on their first four albums: Surfin' Safari (1962), Surfin' U.S.A. (1963), Surfer Girl (1963), and Little Deuce Coupe (1963).

In August 1963, Marks left the Beach Boys due to personal problems with band manager Murry Wilson. Subsequently, Marks formed his own group, the Marksmen, and worked with acts including Casey Kasem's Band Without a Name, the Moon, Delaney & Bonnie, Colours, and Warren Zevon. He also studied jazz and classical guitar at the Berklee College of Music and the New England Conservatory.

Marks has released three solo albums: Work Tapes (1992), Something Funny Goin' On (2006), and I Think About You Often (2006). From 1997 to 1999, he returned to the Beach Boys for their live performances. In 2007, he co-authored a memoir, The Lost Beach Boy, with biographer Jon Stebbins. He reunited with the group for their fiftieth-anniversary tour and the 2012 album That's Why God Made the Radio.

== Biography ==
=== Early years ===
At age seven, David Lee Marks moved into a house across the street from the family home of the three Wilson brothers, Brian, Dennis, and Carl Wilson, later the founding members of The Beach Boys. Describing the neighborhood, Marks noted, "It was run down. There were no sidewalks. The houses were older and the Wilsons lived in a pretty small, modest two-bedroom home. The boys all shared a bedroom. When they got older, Brian started sleeping in the den more and more, which was a converted garage they had turned into a music room. They had a Hammond B-3 organ, an upright piano, and a little hi-fi in there."

As the 1950s progressed, Marks sang and played music with the Wilson family at their Sunday night singalongs. Inspired by a 1958 performance by guitarist John Maus (later of the 1960s Walker Brothers), Marks asked his parents to buy him a guitar, which they did on Christmas Eve, 1958. He began taking lessons from Maus, who had been a student of Ritchie Valens.

In 1959, Marks and Brian Wilson's youngest brother Carl began to develop their own style of playing electric guitars. Brian realized that the combination of Carl and Marks playing brought a rock guitar sound to his original compositions, and the two teenagers participated in Brian's first songwriting efforts that led to the band's 1963 hit single "Surfer Girl".

Marks was not on the Beach Boys first recording, "Surfin'" for Candix Records; that roster included Al Jardine, a high school classmate of Brian Wilson's, who had been singing and playing stand-up bass with the Wilson brothers and their cousin Mike Love. Marks played on the first demo recording for "Surfin'", but he was in school – and his 12-year-old voice was deemed unnecessary – on the October 1961 afternoon the group held the final recording session for the single. Marks joined the Beach Boys in February 1962, replacing Al Jardine who had left (not for dental school as is often stated). Playing rhythm guitar, Marks ended up performing on the band's first four albums.

=== The Beach Boys ===
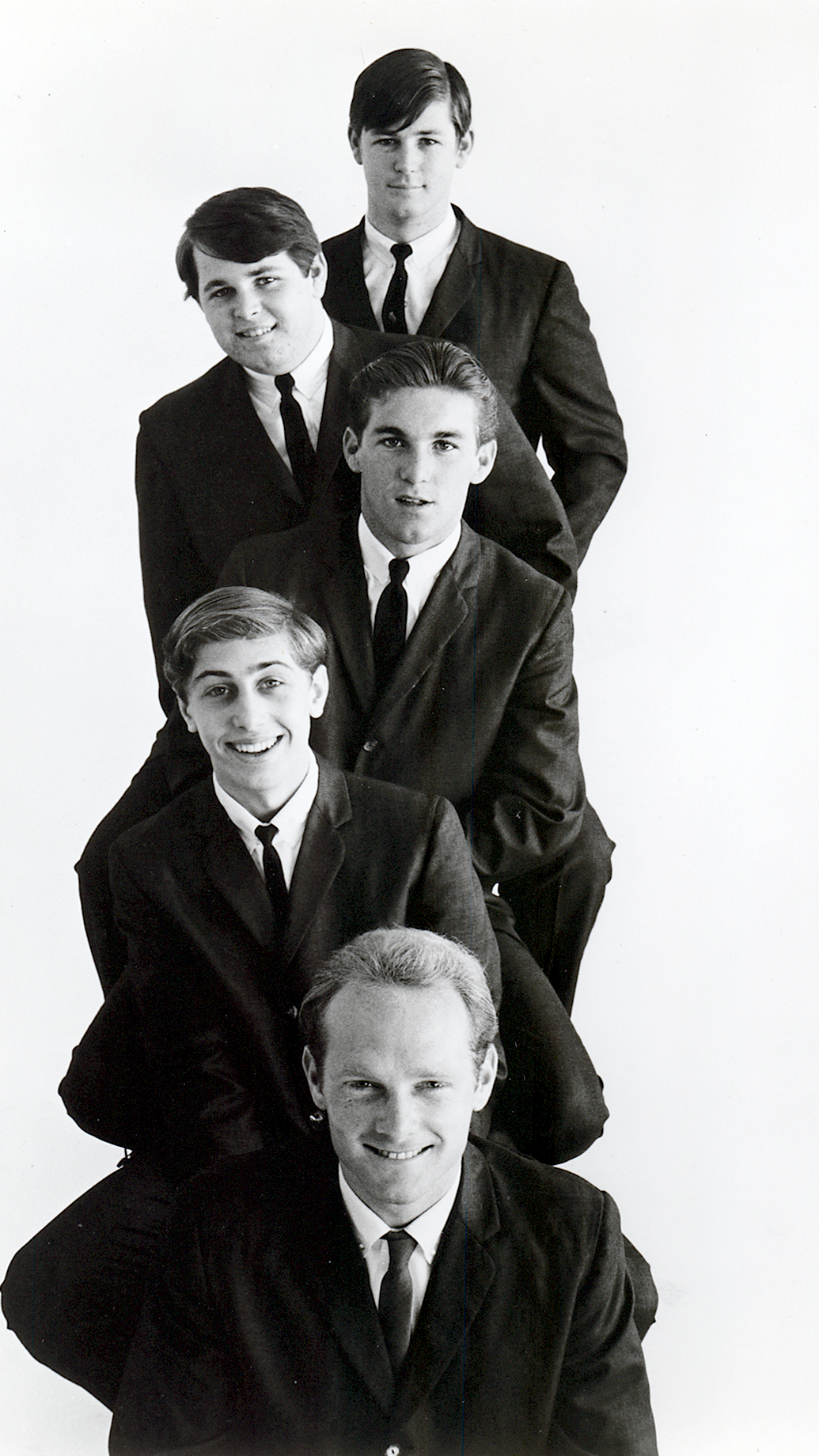
(from top) Brian, Carl, Dennis, Marks, Love, in a Beach Boys photoshoot c. 1962

In April 1962, the Beach Boys recorded a demo session at Western Recorders that produced the masters for the songs "Surfin' Safari" and "409",, which led to a contract with Capitol Records.

According to biographer Jon Stebbins, Marks's guitar chemistry with Carl Wilson changed the sound of the band. Writing about the difference between the Beach Boys' Candix Records single and their first Capitol Records release, Stebbins stated:

Compared to 'Surfin'', this was metal. No sign of stand-up bass or folk sensibility on this recording. And the tiny amateurish guitar sound and lazy feel of the [earlier demo] World Pacific version of 'Surfin' Safari' had now transformed into something crisp and modern. "It was Carl and Dave who brought that electric guitar drive into the band", says Al Jardine. "And because of that, Brian was able to expand a little bit."

Marks continued to sing and play rhythm guitar with the Beach Boys on their first four (plus) albums, including the early hit singles "Surfin' Safari", "409", "Surfin' U.S.A.", "Shut Down", "Surfer Girl", "In My Room", and "Be True to Your School". Marks played over 100 concerts with the Beach Boys, toured across the United States with them, and appeared on their first string of national TV appearances. Marks contributed to their tightly knit sound, as well as their youthful look on the early Beach Boys' album covers.

Although it has been assumed that Marks left the Beach Boys when Jardine returned to the band, this was not exactly the case. Marks and Jardine were both part of the 1963 Beach Boys touring line-up. Jardine returned on a part-time basis to fill-in on bass for Brian Wilson, who had already begun to detach himself from the touring band as early as the spring of 1963.

At the height of their first wave of international success, Marks quit the Beach Boys in late August 1963 toward the end of the group's summer tour during an argument with Murry Wilson, the Wilson boys' father and the band's manager, but did not immediately leave the band until later that year, when his parents and Murry came to blows over financial and managerial issues. The first show without Marks on guitar was October 19, 1963, though he would stay friends and be in close contact with various band members for many years, and he would remain, unbeknownst to him, a legal member of the Beach Boys until September 27, 1967.

=== Post-Beach Boys career ===
In February 1963, Dennis Wilson was injured in a car accident. His replacement was Mark Groseclose, who went to high school with Carl Wilson. Marks and Groseclose became friends and Marks eventually took over Groseclose's garage band, the Jaguars, which he renamed the Marksmen. The band was initially a side project for the aspiring songwriter, who was growing tired of his songs being passed over for Beach Boys records by Murry Wilson.

After Marks left the Beach Boys, the Marksmen became his full-time focus, and one of the first acts to be signed to Herb Alpert's A&M Records in 1964. Murry Wilson reportedly threatened radio deejays in order to keep them from playing the Marksmen's records. Later, the group signed with (and released a single on) Warner Bros. Records, but in spite of packed concert venues up and down the state of California, lack of airplay precluded any further releases. The 2009 release of Marks & the Marksmen Ultimate Collector's Edition 1963–1965 marks the first-time the entire Marksmen catalog was made available to the public.

In 1966, Marks played with Casey Kasem's Band Without a Name. He then worked with the late 1960s psychedelic pop band, The Moon, along with Matt Moore, Larry Brown, and David Jackson. The band signed a production deal with producer Mike Curb and released two under-promoted albums on the Imperial label. He also performed with Delaney and Bonnie, Colours (recording lead guitar on their second album), and Warren Zevon. By the time Marks was 21 years old, he had been signed to five label deals and had grown disillusioned with the Los Angeles music scene. In 1969, he relocated to Boston, where he studied jazz and classical guitar as a private student at the Berklee College of Music and the New England Conservatory of Music in 1970–71.

=== Since 1971 ===
In early 1971, after reuniting onstage in Boston with the Beach Boys, despite a chilly reception from both the public and Bruce Johnston, Marks received an offer from Mike Love to rejoin the band but he declined. In 1972, after Bruce Johnston’s departure from the Beach Boys, Marks was offered to return to the band once again as bassist, which he refused again. Instead, he spent the next 25 years playing with artists like Buzz Clifford, Daniel Moore (writer of "My Maria" and "Shambala"), Gary Montgomery, Jim Keltner, Carl Radle, Leon Russell, drummer-turned-actor Gary Busey, Delbert McClinton, Warren Zevon, and many others, earning a reputation as a solid session guitarist without cashing in on his notoriety as having been a Beach Boy. Marks briefly played lead guitar for Delaney & Bonnie and Friends, but was let go and replaced by Eric Clapton. Marks was also offered the lead guitarist spot in Paul Revere and the Raiders, but turned down the offer because he did not want to dress up in a revolutionary war-era costume every time he played a show. Marks was a close friend of Warren Zevon for years until they had a falling-out. In 1988, when the Beach Boys were inducted into The Rock and Roll Hall of Fame, Marks was neither invited nor acknowledged at the ceremony.

Marks rejoined the Beach Boys as a full-time member playing lead guitar in 1997, when Carl Wilson, fighting cancer, was unable to continue touring with the group. After playing another 300 shows as an official Beach Boy, Marks left the band a second time in 1999 due to his own health issues when he was diagnosed with hepatitis C.

Marks became a leader in the hepatitis C community, appearing in the media to raise awareness of the disease. In 2007, Marks co-wrote The Lost Beach Boy with Stebbins, which detailed his early career and related his "lost years", his health problems, his musical development, and his recovery and acceptance within the Beach Boys community.

On May 20, 2005, the Beach Boys six-man line-up including both Marks and Jardine, was memorialized on the Beach Boys Historic Landmark in Hawthorne, California. The following year, on June 13, 2006, Marks gathered with surviving Beach Boys Brian Wilson, Al Jardine, Mike Love, and Bruce Johnston on the roof of the landmark Capitol Records building in Hollywood, where all five were presented with an RIAA Platinum record Award in recognition of two million in sales of the Beach Boys CD song collection Sounds of Summer: The Very Best of The Beach Boys. In 2008, following the release of a career retrospective, The Lost Years (released to coincide with his book), he toured the UK as a "special guest" with the Beach Boys. He has also semi-regularly performed with Jardine and Dean Torrence of Jan & Dean, in the "Legends of Surf Music" tour, with the Surf City All-Stars.

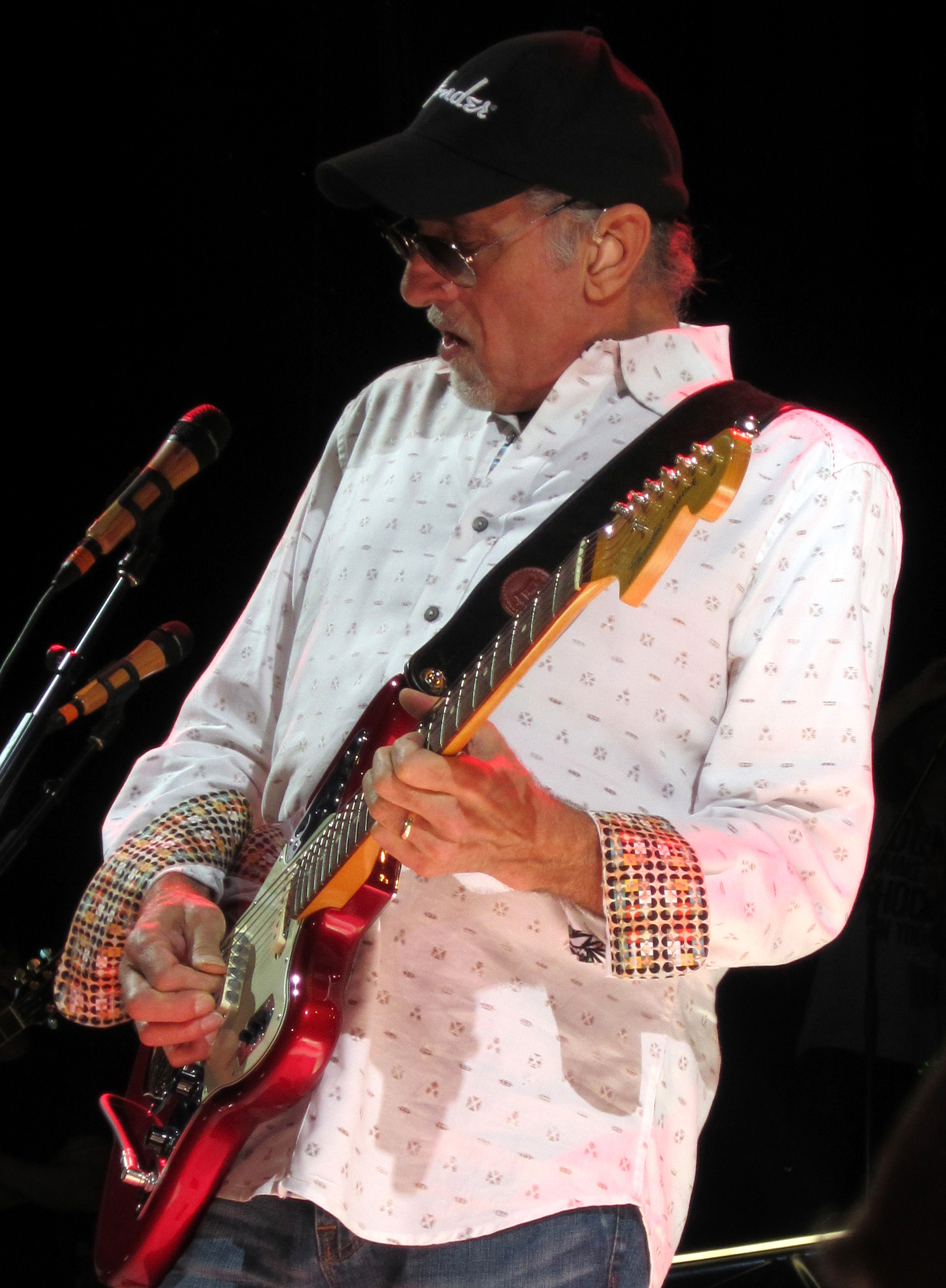
Performing with the Beach Boys in 2012

On December 16, 2011, it was announced that Marks would be reuniting with Brian Wilson, Mike Love, Al Jardine, and Bruce Johnston for a new Beach Boys album and 50th anniversary tour in 2012. The group appeared at the 2012 Grammy Awards on February 12, followed by a 50-date tour that began in Tucson, Arizona in April. Mike Love commented on working with Marks once again, stating, "David rocks. A phenomenal guitarist. When he does those leads on "Surfin'", "Surfin' Safari", and "Fun, Fun, Fun" it's so authentic. He and Carl committed on playing guitar since they were ten years old and were neighbors with each other from across the street in Hawthorne. He's a fantastic musician and a really fantastic guy to be with. He went through his issues with alcohol, but he's completely cooled out for maybe ten years now. It's going to be really great to be with him." Marks took over lead vocal duties on the songs "Hawaii" and "Getcha Back" during the anniversary tour.

Also in 2012, Marks released the album The Circle Continues, which featured a guest appearance from Jardine on vocals on the song "I Sail Away'.

In June 2013, Brian Wilson's website announced that he was recording and self-producing new material with Jardine, Marks, former Beach Boys member Blondie Chaplin, Don Was, and Jeff Beck. It stated that the material might be split into three albums: one of new pop songs, another of mostly instrumental tracks with Beck, and another of interwoven tracks dubbed "the suite" which initially began form as the closing four tracks of That's Why God Made the Radio. Released in April 2015, No Pier Pressure marked another collaboration between Wilson and Joe Thomas, featuring guest appearances from Jardine, Marks, Chaplin, and others.

Following the 50th anniversary reunion tour, it was announced that Marks along with Wilson and Jardine would no longer tour with Johnston and Love; instead, Marks appeared with Jardine and Wilson along with Wilson's band for a short summer tour in 2013 featuring the three. On the tour Marks sang "Little Bird", "Forever", "This Car of Mine", and "Summertime Blues". During the fall, Wilson, Jardine, and Marks joined guitar legend Jeff Beck for a 23 city tour, the foursome appearing on The Tonight Show Starring Jimmy Fallon to promote their tour, with former Beach Boys member Blondie Chaplin as guest musician. Marks declined to join them after the tour.

Marks and his wife, Carrieann, relocated to southern California in 2013 after living for a decade in North Salem, New York.

Jardine, Marks, Johnston, and Love appeared together at the 2014 Ella Awards Ceremony, where Love was honored for his work as a singer. Marks also made other appearances with Love and Johnston's touring Beach Boys group in 2014 and 2015.

Marks has been relatively inactive since 2015. In 2017, Marks made an appearance as himself on an episode of Decker.

In July 2018, Brian Wilson, Love, Jardine, Marks, and Johnston reunited for a one-off Q&A session moderated by director Rob Reiner at the Capitol Records Tower in Los Angeles. It was the first time the band had appeared together in public since their 2012 tour.

In 2019, he performed with Jardine at the "California Saga 2" event to raise money for the homeless.

In April 2021, Omnivore Recordings released California Music Presents Add Some Music, an album featuring Love, Jardine, Marks, Johnston, and several children of the original Beach Boys (most notably on a re-recording of The Beach Boys' "Add Some Music to Your Day" from 1970's Sunflower). The re-recording of “Add Some Music To Your Day” was the first studio recording to feature Mike Love, Al Jardine, Johnston, and Marks together since the end of the 2011-2012 50th anniversary reunion Also in 2021, he sued Universal Music for shortchanging him on royalties from foreign streaming revenue.

In January 2023, the tribute concert mentioned by Azoff in 2021 was announced as being part of the "Grammys Salute" series of televised tribute concerts. On February 8—three days after the 2023 Grammy award ceremonies, A Grammy Salute to the Beach Boys was recorded at the Dolby Theatre in Hollywood, California and subsequently aired as a two-hour special on CBS on April 9. Present for the taping were Wilson, Jardine, Marks, Johnston, and Love—this time not as performers but as featured guests, seated in a luxury box at the theatre, overlooking tribute performances covering the gamut of their catalog by mostly contemporary artists. According to Billboard, the program had 5.18 million viewers.

In March 2024, the band announced the release of a self-titled documentary which would be released by streaming service Disney+, which includes new and archived interviews from various members of the band and their inner circle, including Brian Wilson, Love, Jardine, Marks, Johnston, Carl Wilson, Dennis Wilson, Chaplin, Ricky Fataar, Brian Wilson's ex-wife Marilyn, and Don Was, among others. The documentary was directed by Frank Marshall and Thom Zimny and was released on May 24, 2024. The documentary included some footage from a private reunion of Brian Wilson, Love, Jardine, Marks, and Johnston at Paradise Cove, where the Surfin' Safari album cover photo was taken in 1962. Brian Wilson, Love, Jardine, Marks, Johnston, and Blondie Chaplin also participated in a non-performing reunion at the documentary's premiere on May 24, 2024.

== Discography ==
Solo

Year	Album details
1992	Work Tapes: Released: 1992; Tracks: Siren Song; Ocean Liner; I Wanna Be Your Driver; Fool's Guarantee; Over My Head; Doctor Of Love; Bamboo Shack; Early In The Morning; Have Love Will Travel; Hollywood Joe
2003	Something Funny Goin' On: Released: 2003; Label: Quiver Records; Tracks: Second Wind; Stowaway; Put Yourself In My Place (live); Mixed Drinks & High Emotions; High Side Of Normal; Crenshaw Blvd.; You Can't Talk To Me; The Legend; Put Yourself In My Place; Still Life In Motion; Land Of Opportunity
2006	I Think About You Often: Released: 2006; Label: Quiver Records; Tracks: Like 1969; Bamboo Shack; Light Of The Spirit; I Fall Into The Grace; Big Wave; Stowaway; I'm So Clever; Pretty Eyes; Dancin' In The Mirror; I Ain't Goin' Surfin'; Have You Ever Been Duped; I Think About You Often

- The Marks-Clifford Band "Live At The Blue Dolphin '77" (2006)
- The Lost Years : Limited Edition - triple album Set (2008) Quiver Records
- The Marksmen : The Ultimate Collectors Edition (2008) Quiver Records

The Beach Boys

- Surfin' Safari (1962)
- Surfin' U.S.A. (1963)
- Surfer Girl (1963)
- Little Deuce Coupe (1963)
- That's Why God Made the Radio (2012)
- Live – The 50th Anniversary Tour (2013)

The Moon

- Without Earth (1968)
- The Moon (1969)

Surf City All Stars

- Live In Concert (2007)
- Acoustic Vibrations (2009)
- Live In Concert (2013)

Other appearances

- Mike Love, Bruce Johnston and David Marks of the Beach Boys Salute NASCAR (1998)
- A Postcard from California (Al Jardine, 2010)
- No Pier Pressure (Brian Wilson, 2015)

== See also ==
- Beach Boys Historic Landmark
