= Nick Venet =

American record producer (1936–1998)

Background information
- Also known as: Tony Cost, Nik Venet
- Born: Nikolas Kostantinos Venetoulis; December 3, 1936; Baltimore, Maryland, U.S.
- Died: January 2, 1998 (aged 61) East Los Angeles, California, U.S.
- Occupation: Record producer
- Years active: 1955–1998
- Labels: Capitol, Dot

Nick Venet (born Nikolas Kostantinos Venetoulis, December 3, 1936 – January 2, 1998) was an American record producer, who began his career at age 19 with World Pacific Jazz. He is best known for signing The Beach Boys to Capitol Records and producing the band's earlier material including the song "Surfin' Safari". Brian Wilson credited Venet with helping him learn the craft of production.

== Career ==
Mentored by Lee Gillette, John Hammond, and Richard Bock, he worked with such musicians as Chet Baker, Lord Buckley, Nat "King" Cole, Stan Getz, Chico Hamilton, Stan Kenton, Lambert, Hendricks, and Ross, Peggy Lee, Gerry Mulligan, Ravi Shankar, and Kay Starr. In his early twenties, he joined Capitol Records. As well as being a producer, he was head of A&R at Capitol. He also did some producing with Randy Wood at Dot Records in the mid-1960s.

Venet produced a number of important Capitol clients, including Ray Anthony, The Buddies, Glen Campbell, Cashman, Pistilli, and West, Jim Croce, Ingrid Croce, King Curtis, Karen Dalton, Bobby Darin, The Four Preps, George Gerdes, Jimmie Haskell, Hearts & Flowers with Bernie Leadon, Hedge and Donna, The Hondells, The Honeys, The Kingston Trio, The Leaves, the Lettermen, Lothar and the Hand People, Mad River, Maffit & Davies, Ian Matthews and Matthews Southern Comfort, Onzie Matthews, Les McCann, Fred Neil, Vince Martin, Ricky Nelson, Dinsmore Payne, Lou Rawls, Billy Lee Riley, Murray Roman, Linda Ronstadt, Jack Scott, Maxine Sellers, Serendipity Singers, John Stewart, the Stone Poneys, Allan Taylor, Guthrie Thomas, The Vettes, Wendy Waldman, The Walker Brothers, Sammy Walker, and Timi Yuro.

He was executive producer on spoken word albums such as John G. Neihardt's Black Elk Speaks produced and recorded by William McIntyre, the Odyssey Theater Players in The Chicago Conspiracy Trial, Carl Reiner & Mel Brooks' 2000 Year Old Man series, and Orson Welles' The Begatting of the President. When Capitol Vice President Alan W. Livingston left to start Mediarts Records, he took Venet with him. There Venet produced Dory Previn (who wrote about their romantic relationship in "Lemon Haired Ladies") and Don McLean. He stayed on a few years when the company was acquired by United Artists. He also recorded artists including Sam Cooke and the Pilgrim Travelers, Ivory Joe Hunter, Sarah Kernochan, Vince Martin and the Tarriers, the Nashville Street Singers, Ted Neeley, Wayne Newton, Jack Nitzche, Shorty Rogers, Bonnie Murray Tamblyn, Harriet Schock, Gene Vincent, Waddy Wachtel, Clara Ward, Sarah Kim Wilde, Bobby Womack, and Frank Zappa. He also produced the original cast albums for the Broadway musical Salvation and the off-Broadway hit The Last Session by Steve Schalchlin - ironically, Venet's last session.

Venet shares credits for the music in the skateboard film, Skaterdater (1965). His brother, Steven, was also employed in the music industry as a songwriter.

== Later life and death ==
He later changed his name to Nik Venet in honor of his grandfather. He died on January 2, 1998, from Burkitt's lymphoma, just over a month before Carl Wilson of The Beach Boys. He was survived by his son, filmmaker Nik Venet III.
