= List of songs recorded by the Beach Boys =

This list contains virtually every song recorded by the Beach Boys, including cover versions, outtakes, B-sides, and non-album singles.

Singles are labelled as "non-album" if they were not included on an LP within 12 months of release.

This list excludes:

- solo recordings by the individual members, unless they have been released as a track on a Beach Boys record (such as Brian Wilson's first solo record, "Caroline, No")
- live performances, alternate mixes, or rerecordings of previously released songs, unless they are notably different from the original (such as the extended disco single edit of "Here Comes the Night")
- unreleased tracks (see list of unreleased songs recorded by the Beach Boys)

== List ==
Key
†	Indicates A-sided single release
#	Indicates songs that were not written or co-written by a member of the Beach Boys.
‡	Indicates reissues, compilations, and box sets

Name of song, songwriter(s), years of recording and release, and album debut
Song	Songwriter(s)	Recorded (Note: Recording information sourced from Badman and Doe.)	Album	Year
"10,000 Years Ago"	Dennis Wilson		We Gotta Groove ‡	2026
"409" †	Brian Wilson; Mike Love (Note: Mike Love originally did not receive writing credits for the song until they were awarded to him after a 1994 court case.); Gary Usher	1962	Surfin' Safari	1962
"4th of July"	Dennis Wilson	1971	Good Vibrations ‡	1993
"Add Some Music to Your Day" †	Brian Wilson; Joe Knott; Mike Love	1969–1970	Sunflower	1970
"Airplane"	Brian Wilson	1976–1977	Love You	1977
"All Alone"	Carli Muñoz #	1979	Endless Harmony Soundtrack ‡	1998
"All Dressed Up for School"	Brian Wilson	1964	Little Deuce Coupe/All Summer Long (reissue) ‡	1990
"All I Wanna Do"	Brian Wilson; Mike Love	1969	Sunflower	1970
"All I Want to Do"	Dennis Wilson; Stephen Kalinich	1968	20/20	1969
"All Summer Long"	Brian Wilson; Mike Love	1964	All Summer Long	1964
"All This Is That"	Al Jardine; Carl Wilson; Mike Love	1972	Carl and the Passions – "So Tough"	1972
"Alley Oop"	Dallas Frazier #	1965	Party!	1965
"Amusement Parks U.S.A."	Brian Wilson; Mike Love	1965	Summer Days (And Summer Nights!!)	1965
"And Your Dream Comes True"	Brian Wilson; Mike Love	1965	Summer Days (And Summer Nights!!)	1965
"Angel Come Home"	Carl Wilson; Geoffrey Cushing-Murray	1978	L.A. (Light Album)	1979
"Anna Lee, the Healer"	Brian Wilson; Mike Love	1968	Friends	1968
"Aren't You Glad"	Brian Wilson; Mike Love	1967	Wild Honey	1967
"At My Window"	Brian Wilson; Al Jardine	1969	Sunflower	1970
"Auld Lang Syne"	traditional #	1964	Christmas Album	1964
"Awake"	Floyd Tucker #	1971	Feel Flows ‡	2021
"Away"	Dennis Wilson; Billy Hinsche	1968	Wake the World: The Friends Sessions ‡	2018
"Baby Baby"	Dennis Wilson; Daryl Dragon	1971	Feel Flows ‡	2021
"Baby Blue"	Dennis Wilson; Gregg Jakobson; Karen Lamm	c. 1977	L.A. (Light Album)	1979
"Back Home"	Brian Wilson; Bob Norberg	1975–1976	15 Big Ones	1976
"The Baker Man"	Brian Wilson	1963	Surfin' Safari/Surfin' U.S.A. (reissue) ‡	1990
"Ballad of Ole' Betsy"	Brian Wilson; Roger Christian	1963	Little Deuce Coupe	1963
"Barbara"	Dennis Wilson	1971	Endless Harmony Soundtrack ‡	1998
"Barbara Ann" †	Fred Fassert #	1965	Party!	1965
"Barbie" † (originally credited to Kenny & the Cadets) (Note: Credited to the Beach Boys when released on Lost & Found (1961–62) (1991).)	Bruce Morgan #	1962	Non-album single	1962
"Battle Hymn of the Republic"	Julia Ward Howe #	1974	1974 release ‡	2024
"Barnyard"	Brian Wilson; Van Dyke Parks	1966	The Smile Sessions ‡	2011
"Barnyard Blues"	Dennis Wilson	1974	Made in California ‡	2013
"Be Here in the Mornin'"	Brian Wilson; Carl Wilson; Dennis Wilson; Mike Love; Al Jardine	1968	Friends	1968
"Be Here In The Morning, Darling"	Brian Wilson	1968	Wake the World: The Friends Sessions ‡	2018
"Be Still"	Dennis Wilson; Stephen Kalinich	1968	Friends	1968
"Be True to Your School" †	Brian Wilson; Mike Love	1963	Little Deuce Coupe	1963
"Be with Me"	Dennis Wilson	1968	20/20	1969
"Beach Boys Stomp"	Carl Wilson	1962	Lost & Found (1961–62) ‡	1991
"Beaches In Mind"	Brian Wilson; Mike Love; Joe Thomas	2012	That's Why God Made the Radio	2012
"Bells of Christmas"	Al Jardine; Ron Altbach; Mike Love	1977	Ultimate Christmas ‡	1998
"Before"	Dennis Wilson; Daryl Dragon	1971	Feel Flows ‡	2021
"Behold the Night"	Dennis Wilson; Daryl Dragon	1971	Feel Flows ‡	2021
"Belles of Paris"	Brian Wilson; Mike Love; Ron Altbach	1977–1978	M.I.U. Album	1978
"Better Get Back in Bed"	Brian Wilson	1972	Mount Vernon and Fairway	1973
"Blue Christmas"	Billy Hayes; Jay W. Johnson #	1964	Christmas Album	1964
"Blueberry Hill"	Vincent Rose; Al Lewis; Larry Stock #	1976	15 Big Ones	1976
"Bluebirds over the Mountain" †	Ersel Hickey #	1967–1968	20/20	1969
"Blowin' in the Wind"	Bob Dylan #	1965	Beach Boys' Party! Uncovered and Unplugged ‡	2015
"Body Talk (Grease Job)"		1972	Sail On Sailor – 1972 ‡	2022
"Boogie Woodie"	Nikolai Rimsky-Korsakov; Brian Wilson	1963	Surfer Girl	1963
"Break Away" †	Brian Wilson; Reggie Dunbar	1969	Non-album single	1969
"Brian's Back"	Mike Love	1978	Endless Harmony Soundtrack ‡	1998
"Brian's Jam"	Brian Wilson	1974	1974 release ‡	2024
"Bull Session with the 'Big Daddy'"	Brian Wilson; Carl Wilson; Dennis Wilson; Mike Love; Al Jardine	1965	Today!	1965
"Busy Doin' Nothin'"	Brian Wilson	1968	Friends	1968
"Cabinessence"	Brian Wilson; Van Dyke Parks	1966–1968	20/20	1969
"California Calling"	Al Jardine; Brian Wilson	1984–1985	The Beach Boys	1985
"California Dreamin'" †	John Phillips; Michelle Phillips #	1982	Made in U.S.A. ‡	1986
"California Feelin'"	Brian Wilson; Stephen Kalinich	1978	Made in California ‡	2013
"California Girls" †	Brian Wilson; Mike Love	1965	Summer Days (And Summer Nights!!)	1965
"California Saga/Big Sur"	Mike Love	1972	Holland	1973
"California Saga/California" †	Al Jardine	1972	Holland	1973
"California Saga/The Beaks of Eagles"	Robinson Jeffers; Al Jardine; Lynda Jardine	1972	Holland	1973
"Can't Wait Too Long" (also published as "Been Way Too Long")	Brian Wilson	1967–1968	Good Vibrations ‡	1993
"Car Crazy Cutie"	Brian Wilson; Roger Christian	1963	Little Deuce Coupe	1963
"Carl's Big Chance"	Brian Wilson; Carl Wilson	1964	All Summer Long	1964
"Carnival (Over the Waves)"	Juventino Rosas #	1969–1970	1969: I'm Going Your Way ‡	2019
"Caroline, No" † (originally credited to Brian Wilson) (Note: Credited to the Beach Boys when released on Pet Sounds (1966).)	Brian Wilson; Tony Asher	1966	Pet Sounds	1966
"Carry Me Home"	Dennis Wilson	1972	Sail On Sailor – 1972 ‡	2022
"Carl's Song"	Carl Wilson	1975	We Gotta Groove ‡	2026
"Cassius Love vs. Sonny Wilson"	Mike Love; Brian Wilson	1964	Shut Down Volume 2	1964
"A Casual Look"	Ed Wells #	1976	15 Big Ones	1976
"Catch a Wave"	Brian Wilson; Mike Love	1963	Surfer Girl	1963
"Celebrate the News"	Dennis Wilson; Gregg Jakobson	1969	Non-album single	1969
"Chapel of Love"	Jeff Barry; Ellie Greenwich; Phil Spector #	1976	15 Big Ones	1976
"Chasin' the Sky"	Randy Bishop #	1984	Up the Creek	1984
"Cherry, Cherry Coupe"	Brian Wilson; Roger Christian	1963	Little Deuce Coupe	1963
"Child Is Father of the Man"	Brian Wilson; Van Dyke Parks	1966–1967	The Smile Sessions ‡	2011
"Child of Winter (Christmas Song)" †	Brian Wilson; Stephen Kalinich	1974	Non-album single	1974
"Christmas Eve"	Brian Wilson	1964	Keep an Eye on Summer – The Beach Boys Sessions 1964 ‡	2014
"Christmas Day"	Brian Wilson	1964	Christmas Album	1964
"Christmas Time Is Here Again"	Buddy Holly; Jerry Allison; Norman Petty; Al Jardine	1977	Ultimate Christmas ‡	1998
"Chug-A-Lug"	Brian Wilson; Gary Usher; Mike Love	1962	Surfin' Safari	1962
"Cindy, Oh Cindy"	B. Barons; B. Long #	1962	Surfin' Safari/Surfin' U.S.A. (reissue) ‡	1990
"City Jim"	Carl Wilson	1972	1972 Release ‡	2022
"Come Go with Me"	C.E. Quick	1977–1978	M.I.U. Album	1978
"Cool, Cool Water" †	Brian Wilson; Mike Love	1967–1970	Sunflower	1970
"Cotton Fields (The Cotton Song)" †	Huddie Ledbetter #	1968	20/20	1969
"Country Air"	Brian Wilson; Mike Love	1967	Wild Honey	1967
"County Fair"	Brian Wilson; Gary Usher	1962	Surfin' Safari	1962
"Crack at Your Love"	Brian Wilson; Al Jardine	1984–1985	The Beach Boys	1985
"Crocodile Rock"	Elton John; Bernie Taupin #	c. 1991	Two Rooms: Celebrating the Songs of Elton John and Bernie Taupin	1991
"Cuckoo Clock"	Brian Wilson; Gary Usher	1962	Surfin' Safari	1962
"Cuddle Up"	Dennis Wilson; Daryl Dragon	1972	Carl and the Passions – "So Tough"	1972
"Custom Machine"	Brian Wilson; Mike Love	1963	Little Deuce Coupe	1963
"Da Doo Ron Ron"	Phil Spector; Jeff Barry; Ellie Greenwich #	1979	Made in California ‡	2013
"Dance, Dance, Dance" †	Brian Wilson; Carl Wilson; Mike Love	1964	Today!	1965
"Darlin'" †	Brian Wilson; Mike Love	1967	Wild Honey	1967
"Daybreak Over The Ocean"	Mike Love	2012	That's Why God Made the Radio	2012
"A Day in the Life of a Tree"	Brian Wilson; Jack Rieley	1971	Surf's Up	1971
"Deirdre"	Bruce Johnston; Brian Wilson	1969	Sunflower	1970
"Denny's Drums"	Dennis Wilson	1964	Shut Down Volume 2	1964
"Devoted to You"	Boudleaux Bryant #	1965	Party!	1965
"Diamond Head"	Al Vescovo; Lyle Ritz; Jim Ackley; Brian Wilson	1968	Friends	1968
"The Diary"	Neil Sedaka; Howard Greenfield #	1965	Beach Boys' Party! Uncovered and Unplugged ‡	2015
"Ding Dang"	Brian Wilson; Roger McGuinn	1973–1976	Love You	1977
"Disney Girls"	Bruce Johnston	1971	Surf's Up	1971
"Do It Again" †	Brian Wilson; Mike Love	1968	20/20	1969
"Do You Like Worms"	Brian Wilson; Van Dyke Parks	1966	Good Vibrations ‡	1993
"Do You Remember?"	Brian Wilson; Mike Love	1964	All Summer Long	1964
"Do You Wanna Dance?" †	Bobby Freeman #	1965	Today!	1965
"Don't Back Down"	Brian Wilson; Mike Love	1964	All Summer Long	1964
"Don't Go Near the Water"	Mike Love; Al Jardine	1971	Surf's Up	1971
"Don't Hurt My Little Sister"	Brian Wilson; Mike Love	1964	Today!	1965
"Don't Talk (Put Your Head on My Shoulder)"	Brian Wilson; Tony Asher	1966	Pet Sounds	1966
"Don’t Worry Baby"	Brian Wilson; Roger Christian	1964	Shut Down Volume 2	1964
"Drive-In"	Brian Wilson; Mike Love	1963–1964	All Summer Long	1964
"East Meets West" † (featuring the Four Seasons)	Bob Gaudio; Bob Crewe #	1983	Non-album single	1984
"Endless Harmony"	Bruce Johnston	1979	Keepin' the Summer Alive	1980
"Endless Sleep"	Dolores Nance; Jody Reynolds #	1964	Keep an Eye on Summer – The Beach Boys Sessions 1964 ‡	2014
"Everybody Wants to Live"	Brian Wilson	1977	We Gotta Groove ‡	2026
"Everyone's in Love with You" †	Mike Love	1975–1976	15 Big Ones	1976
"Fall Breaks and Back to Winter (W. Woodpecker Symphony)"	Brian Wilson	1967	Smiley Smile	1967
"Farmer's Daughter"	Brian Wilson; Mike Love	1963	Surfin' U.S.A.	1963
"Feel Flows"	Carl Wilson; Jack Rieley	1971	Surf's Up	1971
"Finders Keepers"	Brian Wilson; Mike Love	1963	Surfin' U.S.A.	1963
"Forever"	Dennis Wilson; Gregg Jakobson	1969	Sunflower	1970
"Friends" †	Brian Wilson; Carl Wilson; Dennis Wilson; Al Jardine	1968	Friends	1968
"From There to Back Again"	Brian Wilson; Joe Thomas	2012	That's Why God Made the Radio	2012
"Frosty the Snowman"	Steve Nelson; Jack Rollins #	1964	Christmas Album	1964
"Full Sail"	Carl Wilson; Geoffrey Cushing-Murray	1978	L.A. (Light Album)	1979
"Fun, Fun, Fun" †	Brian Wilson; Mike Love	1964	Shut Down Volume 2	1964
"Funky Pretty"	Brian Wilson; Mike Love; Jack Rieley	1972	Holland	1973
"Game of Love"	Clint Ballard Jr. #	1967	1967 – Sunshine Tomorrow ‡	2017
"Games Two Can Play"	Brian Wilson	1969	Good Vibrations ‡	1993
"Getcha Back" †	Mike Love; Terry Melcher	1984–1985	The Beach Boys	1985
"Gee"	William Davis; Viola Watkins #	1967	The Smile Sessions ‡	2011
"Gettin' Hungry"	Brian Wilson; Mike Love	1967	Smiley Smile	1967
"Gimme Some Lovin'"	Steve Winwood; Spencer Davis; Muff Winwood #	1977	We Gotta Groove ‡	2026
"Gimme Some Lovin'" / "I Need Your Love"	#	1972	Sail On Sailor – 1972 ‡	2022
"Girl Don't Tell Me"	Brian Wilson	1965	Summer Days (And Summer Nights!!)	1965
"The Girl from New York City"	Brian Wilson; Mike Love	1965	Summer Days (And Summer Nights!!)	1965
"Girls on the Beach"	Brian Wilson	1964	All Summer Long	1964
"God Only Knows"	Brian Wilson; Tony Asher	1966	Pet Sounds	1966
"Goin' On" †	Brian Wilson; Mike Love	1979–1980	Keepin' the Summer Alive	1980
"Goin' South"	Carl Wilson; Geoffrey Cushing-Murray	1978	L.A. (Light Album)	1979
"Goin' to the Beach"	Mike Love	1979	Made in California ‡	2013
"Good News"	Louis Gottlieb #	1967	Sunshine Tomorrow 2 – The Studio Sessions ‡	2017
"Good Time"	Brian Wilson; Al Jardine	1970	Love You	1977
"Good Timin'" †	Brian Wilson; Carl Wilson	1974–1978	L.A. (Light Album)	1979
"Good to My Baby"	Brian Wilson; Mike Love	1965	Today!	1965
"Good Vibrations" †	Brian Wilson; Mike Love	1966	Smiley Smile	1967
"The Gong"	Dennis Wilson	1968	I Can Hear Music: The 20/20 Sessions ‡	2018
"Got to Know the Woman"	Dennis Wilson	1969	Sunflower	1970
"Graduation Day"	Joe Sherman; Noel Sherman #	1965	Today!/Summer Days (And Summer Nights!!) (reissue) ‡	1990
"Guess I'm Dumb" (originally credited to Glen Campbell (Note: Credited to the Beach Boys when released on Made in California (2013).))	Brian Wilson; Russ Titelman	1965	Non-album single	1965
"Had to Phone Ya"	Brian Wilson; Mike Love; Diane Rovell	1976	15 Big Ones	1976
"Happy Birthday Roger McGuinn"	Carl Wilson	1974	1974 release ‡	2024
"Happy Endings" †	Bruce Johnston; Terry Melcher	c. 1987	Non-album single	1987
"Hard Time"		1972	Sail On Sailor – 1972 ‡	2022
"Hawaii"	Brian Wilson; Mike Love	1963	Surfer Girl	1963
"Hawaiian Dream"	Dennis Wilson; Daryl Dragon	1971	Feel Flows ‡	2021
"He Come Down"	Brian Wilson; Al Jardine; Mike Love	1971–1972	Carl and the Passions – "So Tough"	1972
"He Gives Speeches"	Brian Wilson; Van Dyke Parks	1966	The Smile Sessions ‡	2011
"Heads You Win - Tails I Lose"	Brian Wilson; Gary Usher	1962	Surfin' Safari	1962
"Hang On Sloopy"	Wes Farrell; Bert Berns #	1965	Beach Boys' Party! Uncovered and Unplugged ‡	2015
"H.E.L.P. Is On the Way"	Brian Wilson	1969–1970	Good Vibrations ‡	1993
"Heart and Soul"	Frank Loesser #	1965	Beach Boys' Party! Uncovered and Unplugged ‡	2015
"Help Me, Rhonda" † (also spelled "Help Me, Ronda")	Brian Wilson; Mike Love	1965	Today!	1965
"Here Comes the Night"	Brian Wilson; Mike Love	1967	Wild Honey	1967
"Here Comes the Night" † (disco edit)	Brian Wilson; Mike Love	1978–1979	L.A. (Light Album)	1979
"Here She Comes"	Ricky Fataar; Blondie Chaplin	1971–1972	Carl and the Passions – "So Tough"	1972
"Here Today"	Brian Wilson; Tony Asher	1966	Pet Sounds	1966
"Heroes and Villains" †	Brian Wilson; Van Dyke Parks	1966–1967	Smiley Smile	1967
"Hey Little Tomboy"	Brian Wilson	1976–1977	M.I.U. Album	1978
"Hide Go Seek"	Brian Wilson	1967	1967 – Sunshine Tomorrow ‡	2017
"Hold On Dear Brother"	Ricky Fataar; Blondie Chaplin	1972	Carl and the Passions – "So Tough"	1972
"Holidays"	Brian Wilson	1966	The Smile Sessions ‡	2011
"Holy Man"	Dennis Wilson	1977	We Gotta Groove ‡	2026
"Honkin' Down the Highway" †	Brian Wilson	1976	Love You	1977
"Honky Tonk"	Bill Doggett; Billy Butler; Clifford Scott; Shep Shepherd #	1963	Surfin' U.S.A.	1963
"Honey Get Home"	Brian Wilson	1967	1967 – Sunshine Tomorrow ‡	2017
"Hot Fun in the Summertime" †	Sylvester Stewart #	1991–1992	Summer in Paradise	1992
"How She Boogalooed It"	Mike Love; Bruce Johnston; Al Jardine; Carl Wilson	1967	Wild Honey	1967
"Hully Gully"	Fred Sledge Smith; Cliff Goldsmith #	1965	Party!	1965
"Hushabye"	Doc Pomus; Mort Shuman #	1964	All Summer Long	1964
"I Can Hear Music" †	Jeff Barry; Ellie Greenwich; Phil Spector #	1968	20/20	1969
"(I Can't Get No) Satisfaction"	Mick Jagger; Keith Richards #	1965	Beach Boys' Party! Uncovered and Unplugged ‡	2015
"I Do"	Brian Wilson	1963	Surfer Girl/Shut Down Volume 2 (reissue) ‡	1990
"I Do Love You"	Stevie Wonder #	1984–1985	The Beach Boys	1985
"I Don't Know"	Dennis Wilson	1967	The Smile Sessions ‡	2011
"I Get Around" †	Brian Wilson; Mike Love	1964	All Summer Long	1964
"I Just Got My Pay"	Brian Wilson	1970	Good Vibrations ‡	1993
"I Just Wasn't Made for These Times"	Brian Wilson; Tony Asher	1966	Pet Sounds	1966
"I Know There's an Answer" (also known as "Hang On to Your Ego")	Brian Wilson; Terry Sachen; Mike Love	1966	Pet Sounds	1966
"I Love to Say Da Da" (also published as "Love to Say Dada")	Brian Wilson	1967	Good Vibrations ‡	1993
"(I Saw Santa) Rockin' Around the Christmas Tree"	Brian Wilson; Al Jardine	1977	Ultimate Christmas ‡	1993
"I Should Have Known Better"	John Lennon; Paul McCartney #	1965	Party!	1965
"I Wanna Be Around / Workshop"	Sadie Vimmersteldt; Johnny Mercer; Brian Wilson	1966	The Smile Sessions ‡	2011
"I Wanna Pick You Up"	Brian Wilson	1976	Love You	1977
"I Was Made to Love Her"	Henry Cosby; Sylvia Moy; Lula Mae Hardaway; Stevie Wonder #	1967	Wild Honey	1967
"I Went to Sleep"	Brian Wilson; Carl Wilson	1968	20/20	1969
"I'd Love Just Once to See You"	Brian Wilson; Mike Love	1967	Wild Honey	1967
"I'll Be Home for Christmas"	Kim Gannon; Walter Kent; Buck Ram #	1964	Christmas Album	1964
"I'll Bet He's Nice"	Brian Wilson	1976	Love You	1977
"I'm Bugged at My Ol' Man"	Brian Wilson	1965	Summer Days (And Summer Nights!!)	1965
"I'm Confessin'"	Brian Wilson	1968	Wake the World: The Friends Sessions ‡	2018
"I'm Going Your Way"	Dennis Wilson	1969	1969: I'm Going Your Way ‡	2019
"I'm in Great Shape"	Brian Wilson; Van Dyke Parks	1966	The Smile Sessions ‡	2011
"I'm So Lonely"	Brian Wilson; Eugene Landy	1984–1985	The Beach Boys	1985
"I'm So Young"	William H. Tyrus Jr. #	1965	Today!	1965
"I'm the Pied Piper"	Brian Wilson; Carl Wilson	1972	Mount Vernon and Fairway	1973
"I'm Waiting for the Day"	Brian Wilson; Mike Love	1966	Pet Sounds	1966
"In My Car"	Brian Wilson; Eugene Landy; Alexandra Morgan	1989	Still Cruisin'	1989
"In My Room"	Brian Wilson; Gary Usher	1963	Surfer Girl	1963
"In the Back of My Mind"	Brian Wilson; Mike Love	1965	Today!	1965
"In the Parkin' Lot"	Brian Wilson; Roger Christian	1964	Shut Down Volume 2	1964
"In the Still of the Night"	Fred Parris #	1976	15 Big Ones	1976
"Is It True What They Say About Dixie?"	Irving Caesar; Sammy Lerner; Gerald Marks #	1968	I Can Hear Music: The 20/20 Sessions ‡	2018
"Island Fever"	Mike Love; Terry Melcher	1991–1992	Summer in Paradise	1992
"Island Girl"	Al Jardine	1987–1989	Still Cruisin'	1989
"It Could Be Anything" (also known as "Where We Are")	Carl Wilson	1978	We Gotta Groove ‡	2026
"Isn't It Time" †	Brian Wilson; Mike Love; Joe Thomas; Jim Peterik; Larry Millas	2011–2012	That's Why God Made the Radio	2012
"It's a Beautiful Day" †	Mike Love; Al Jardine	1979	Non-album single	1979
"It's About Time"	Dennis Wilson; Carl Wilson; Bob Burchman; Al Jardine	1970	Sunflower	1970
"It's Gettin' Late" †	Carl Wilson; Myrna Smith; Robert White Johnson	1984–1985	The Beach Boys	1985
"It's a New Day"	Dennis Wilson; Daryl Dragon; Stanley Shapiro	1971	Feel Flows ‡	2021
"It's Just a Matter of Time"	Brian Wilson; Eugene Landy	1984–1985	The Beach Boys	1985
"It's Natural"	David Sandler #	1971	Feel Flows ‡	2021
"It's OK" †	Brian Wilson; Mike Love	1976	15 Big Ones	1976
"It's Over Now"	Brian Wilson	1977	Good Vibrations ‡	1993
"It's Trying to Say"	Brian Wilson	1977	We Gotta Groove ‡	2026
"I've Got a Friend"	Dennis Wilson	1971	Feel Flows ‡	2021
"Johnny Carson"	Brian Wilson	1976	Love You	1977
"Jingle Bells"	James Lord Pierpont #	1964	Keep an Eye on Summer – The Beach Boys Sessions 1964 ‡	2014
"Judy"	Brian Wilson	1962	Lost & Found (1961–62) ‡	1991
"Just Once in My Life"	Gerry Goffin; Carole King; Phil Spector #	1976	15 Big Ones	1976
"Just for You"	Dennis Wilson	1971	Misc Tracks 1971 ‡	2021
"Keep an Eye on Summer"	Brian Wilson; Bob Norman	1964	Shut Down Volume 2	1964
"Keepin' the Summer Alive"	Carl Wilson; Randy Bachman	1979–1980	Keepin' the Summer Alive	1980
"Kiss Me, Baby"	Brian Wilson; Mike Love	1964	Today!	1965
"Kokomo" †	Mike Love; Scott McKenzie; Terry Melcher; John Phillips	1988	Still Cruisin'	1988
"Kona Coast"	Al Jardine; Mike Love	1977	M.I.U. Album	1978
"Lady" (originally credited to Dennis Wilson & Rumbo)	Dennis Wilson	1970	Non-album single	1970
"Lady Liberty"	Al Jardine; Ron Altbach	c. 1986	Non-album single	1986
"Lady Lynda" †	Al Jardine; Ron Altbach	1978	L.A. (Light Album)	1979
"Laugh at Me"	Sonny Bono #	1965	Beach Boys' Party! Uncovered and Unplugged ‡	2015
"Lahaina Aloha"	Mike Love; Terry Melcher	1991–1992	Summer in Paradise	1992
"Lana"	Brian Wilson	1963	Surfin' U.S.A.	1963
"Land Ahoy"	Brian Wilson	1962	Rarities ‡	1983
"Lavender"	Dorinda Morgan #	1961	Lost & Found (1961–62) ‡	1991
"Lazy Lizzie"	Brian Wilson	1976	We Gotta Groove ‡	2026
"Leaving This Town"	Ricky Fataar; Blondie Chaplin; Carl Wilson; Mike Love	1972	Holland	1973
"Let Him Run Wild"	Brian Wilson; Mike Love	1965	Summer Days (And Summer Nights!!)	1965
"Let the Wind Blow"	Brian Wilson; Mike Love	1967	Wild Honey	1967
"Let Us Go On This Way"	Brian Wilson; Mike Love	1976	Love You	1977
"Let's Go Away for Awhile"	Brian Wilson	1966	Pet Sounds	1966
"Let's Go Trippin'"	Dick Dale #	1963	Surfin' U.S.A.	1963
"Let's Put Our Hearts Together"	Brian Wilson	1976	Love You	1977
"Life Is for the Living"	Brian Wilson	1977	We Gotta Groove ‡	2026
"The Letter"	Wayne Carson #	1967	Rarities ‡	1983
"Little Bird"	Dennis Wilson; Stephen Kalinich	1968	Friends	1968
"Little Child (Daddy Dear)"	#	1972	Sail On Sailor – 1972 ‡	2022
"Little Deuce Coupe"	Brian Wilson; Roger Christian	1963	Surfer Girl	1963
"The Little Girl I Once Knew" †	Brian Wilson	1965	Non-album single	1965
"Little Girl (You're My Miss America)"	Vincent Catalano; Herb Alpert #	1962	Surfin' Safari	1962
"Little Honda"	Brian Wilson; Mike Love	1964	All Summer Long	1964
"Little Pad"	Brian Wilson	1967	Smiley Smile	1967
"Little Saint Nick" †	Brian Wilson; Mike Love	1963	Christmas Album	1963
"Little Surfer Girl"	Brian Wilson	c. 1962–1963	Good Vibrations ‡	1993
"Life Symphony"	Dennis Wilson	1974	1974 release ‡	2024
"Livin' with a Heartache" †	Carl Wilson; Randy Bachman	1979–1980	Keepin' the Summer Alive	1980
"Living Doll"	Brian Wilson; Alexandra Morgan; Eugene Landy	1987	Barbie: California Dream	1987
"Look (Song for Children)"	Brian Wilson	1966	The Smile Sessions ‡	2011
"Lonely Days"	Unknown	1967	Hawthorne, CA ‡	2001
"Lonely Sea"	Brian Wilson; Gary Usher	1962	Surfin' U.S.A.	1963
"Long Road"	Dennis Wilson	1974	1974 release ‡	2024
"Long Promised Road" †	Carl Wilson; Jack Rieley	1971	Surf's Up	1971
"Long Tall Sally"	Robert Blackwell; Enotris Johnson; Little Richard #	1965	Beach Boys' Party! Uncovered and Unplugged ‡	2015
"Lookin' at Tomorrow (A Welfare Song)"	Al Jardine; Gary Winfrey	1970	Surf's Up	1971
"Loop De Loop (Flip Flop Flyin' In An Aeroplane)"	Brian Wilson; Carl Wilson; Al Jardine	1969–1998	Endless Harmony Soundtrack ‡	1998
"Lines"	Brian Wilson	1977	We Gotta Groove ‡	2026
"The Lord's Prayer"	Albert Hay Malotte #	1963	Non-album single	1964
"Louie, Louie"	Richard Berry #	1964	Shut Down Volume 2	1964
"Love Affair"	Dennis Wilson	1968	I Can Hear Music: The 20/20 Sessions ‡	2018
"Love Is a Woman"	Brian Wilson	1976	Love You	1977
"Love Surrounds Me"	Dennis Wilson; Geoffrey Cushing-Murray	1977	L.A. (Light Album)	1979
"Luau"	Bruce Morgan #	1961	Non-album single	1961
"Lucy Jones"	Brian Wilson; Steve Kalinich	1974	California Feeling 2 ‡	2015
"Magic Transistor Radio"	Brian Wilson	1972	Mount Vernon and Fairway	1973
"Make It Big"	Mike Love; Bob House; Terry Melcher	1989	Still Cruisin'	1989
"Make It Good"	Dennis Wilson; Daryl Dragon	1972	Carl and the Passions – "So Tough"	1972
"Male Ego"	Brian Wilson; Mike Love; Eugene Landy	1984–1985	The Beach Boys	1985
"Mama Says"	Brian Wilson; Mike Love	1967	Wild Honey	1967
"The Man with All the Toys" †	Brian Wilson; Mike Love	1964	Christmas Album	1964
"Marcella" †	Brian Wilson; Tandyn Almer; Jack Rieley	1972	Carl and the Passions – "So Tough"	1972
"Match Point of Our Love"	Brian Wilson; Mike Love	1977	M.I.U. Album	1978
"Marilyn Rovell"	Brian Wilson	1976	We Gotta Groove ‡	2026
"Maybe I Don't Know"	Carl Wilson; Myrna Smith; Steve Levine; Julian Lindsay	1984–1985	The Beach Boys	1985
"Meant for You"	Brian Wilson; Mike Love	1968	Friends	1968
"Medley: All of My Love / Ecology"	Dennis Wilson; Daryl Dragon	1971	Feel Flows ‡	2021
"Medley: Happy Birthday, Brian / God Only Knows"	Brian Wilson; Tony Asher	1970	Feel Flows ‡	2021
"Melekalikimaka"	Al Jardine; Mike Love	1977	Ultimate Christmas ‡	1998
"Merry Christmas, Baby"	Brian Wilson; Mike Love	1964	Christmas Album	1964
"Misirlou"	Fred Wise; Sidney Keith Russell; Michalis Patrinos; Milton Leeds; Nick Roubanis #	1963	Surfin' U.S.A.	1963
"Mona"	Brian Wilson	1976	Love You	1977
"Mona Kana"	Dennis Wilson; Steve Kalinich	1968	Made in California ‡	2013
"Moog and Piano Riff"	Dennis Wilson	1974	1974 release ‡	2024
"Mony Mony"	Tommy James; Bo Gentry; Ritchie Cordell; Bobby Bloom #	1976	We Gotta Groove ‡	2026
"The Monkey's Uncle"	Richard M. Sherman; Robert B. Sherman #	1965	The Monkey's Uncle Soundtrack	1965
"Moon Dawg"	Derry Weaver #	1962	Surfin' Safari	1962
"Morning Christmas"	Dennis Wilson	1977	Ultimate Christmas ‡	1998
"Mt. Vernon and Fairway (Theme)"	Brian Wilson	1972	Mount Vernon and Fairway	1973
"Mother May I"	Brian Wilson	1963	The Big Beat 1963 ‡	2013
"Mountain of Love"	Harold Dorman #	1965	Party!	1965
"My Diane"	Brian Wilson	1977–1978	M.I.U. Album	1978
"My Love Lives On"	Dennis Wilson; Steve Kalinich	1974	Made in California ‡	2013
"My Little Red Book"	Burt Bacharach; Hal David#	1968	Wake the World: The Friends Sessions ‡	2018
"My Only Sunshine (The Old Master Painter / You Are My Sunshine)"	Haven Gillespie; Jimmie Davis; Charles Mitchell #	1966	The Smile Sessions ‡	2011
"My Solution"	Brian Wilson	1970	Feel Flows ‡	2021
"The Nearest Faraway Place"	Bruce Johnston	1968	20/20	1969
"Never Learn Not to Love"	Dennis Wilson	1968	20/20	1969
"New England Waltz"	Brian Wilson	1977	We Gotta Groove ‡	2026
"New Song (Transcendental Meditation)"	Brian Wilson	1968	Wake the World: The Friends Sessions ‡	2018
"The Night Was So Young"	Brian Wilson	1976	Love You	1977
"Noble Surfer"	Brian Wilson; Mike Love	1963	Surfin' U.S.A.	1963
"No-Go Showboat"	Brian Wilson; Roger Christian	1963	Little Deuce Coupe	1963
"Oh Darlin'" †	Brian Wilson; Mike Love	1979	Keepin' the Summer Alive	1980
"Oh Sweet Something"	Blondie Chaplin; Ricky Fataar	1972	Sail On Sailor – 1972 ‡	2022
"Oh Yeah"	Unknown	1968	I Can Hear Music: The 20/20 Sessions ‡	2018
"On Broadway"	Barry Mann; Cynthia Weil; Jerry Leiber; Mike Stoller #	1976	We Gotta Groove ‡	2026
"Old Folks at Home (Swanee River)"/"Ol' Man River"	Stephen Foster/ Jerome Kern; Oscar Hammerstein II #	1968	Friends/20/20 (reissue) ‡	1990
"One Kiss Led to Another"	Jerry Leiber, Mike Stoller #	1965	Beach Boys' Party! Uncovered and Unplugged	2015
"Only with You"	Dennis Wilson; Mike Love	1972	Holland	1973
"Our Car Club"	Brian Wilson; Mike Love	1963	Surfer Girl	1963
"Our Favorite Recording Sessions"	Brian Wilson; Carl Wilson; Dennis Wilson; Mike Love; Al Jardine	1964	All Summer Long	1964
"Our Prayer"	Brian Wilson	1966–1968	20/20	1969
"Our New Home"	Brian Wilson	1968	Wake the World: The Friends Sessions ‡	2018
"Our Sweet Love"	Brian Wilson; Carl Wilson; Al Jardine	1969–1970	Sunflower	1970
"Our Team"	Brian Wilson; Carl Wilson; Dennis Wilson; Mike Love; Al Jardine	1977	Good Vibrations ‡	1993
"Out in the Country"		1972	Sail On Sailor – 1972 ‡	2022
"Pacific Coast Highway"	Brian Wilson; Joe Thomas	2012	That's Why God Made the Radio	2012
"Palisades Park"	Chuck Barris #	1976	15 Big Ones	1976
"Papa-Oom-Mow-Mow"	Carl White; Al Frazier; Sonny Harris; Turner Wilson Jr. #	1965	Party!	1965
"Passing By"	Brian Wilson	1968	Friends	1968
"Passing Friend"	George O'Dowd; Roy Hay #	1984–1985	The Beach Boys	1985
"Peggy Sue" †	Buddy Holly; Jerry Allison; Norman Petty #	1977–1978	M.I.U. Album	1978
"Peaches"	Dennis Wilson	1968	I Can Hear Music: The 20/20 Sessions ‡	2018
"Pet Sounds"	Brian Wilson	1965	Pet Sounds	1966
"Pitter Patter"	Brian Wilson; Mike Love; Al Jardine	1977	M.I.U. Album	1978
"Please Let Me Wonder"	Brian Wilson; Mike Love	1965	Today!	1965
"Pom Pom Play Girl"	Brian Wilson; Gary Usher	1964	Shut Down Volume 2	1964
"Private Life Of Bill And Sue"	Brian Wilson; Joe Thomas	2012	That's Why God Made The Radio	2012
"Problem Child" †	Terry Melcher #	1990	Non-album single	1990
"Punchline"	Brian Wilson	1963	Good Vibrations ‡	1993
"Radio King Dom"	Brian Wilson; Jack Rieley	1972	Mount Vernon and Fairway	1973
"Remember "Walking In The Sand""	George Morton #	1991–1992	Summer in Paradise	1992
"Riot in Cell Block Number 9"	Jerry Leiber; Mike Stoller #	1965	Beach Boys' Party! Uncovered and Unplugged ‡	2015
"Rock 'n' Roll to the Rescue" †	Mike Love; Terry Melcher	1986	Made in U.S.A. ‡	1986
"Rock and Roll Music" †	Chuck Berry #	1976	15 Big Ones	1976
"Rock and Roll Woman"	Stephen Stills #	1968	Wake the World: The Friends Sessions ‡	2018
"The Rocking Surfer"	traditional #	1963	Surfer Girl	1963
"Roller Skating Child"	Brian Wilson	1976	Love You	1977
"Rollin' Up to Heaven"	Dennis Wilson	1974	1974 release ‡	2024
"Rooftop Harry"		1972	Sail On Sailor – 1972 ‡	2022
"Ruby Baby"	Jerry Leiber; Mike Stoller #	1965	Good Vibrations ‡	1993
"Runnin' Bear"	J. P. Richardson #	1976	We Gotta Groove ‡	2026
"Sail On, Sailor" †	Brian Wilson; Tandyn Almer; Ray Kennedy; Jack Rieley; Van Dyke Parks	1972	Holland	1973
"Sail Plane Song"	Brian Wilson; Carl Wilson	1968	Endless Harmony Soundtrack ‡	1998
"Salt Lake City"	Brian Wilson; Mike Love	1965	Summer Days (And Summer Nights!!)	1965
"San Miguel"	Dennis Wilson; Gregg Jakobson	1969	Ten Years of Harmony ‡	1981
"Santa Ana Winds"	Brian Wilson; Al Jardine	1979–1980	Keepin' the Summer Alive	1980
"Santa Claus Is Comin' to Town"	J. Fred Coots; Haven Gillespie #	1964	Christmas Album	1964
"Santa's Beard"	Brian Wilson; Mike Love	1964	Christmas Album	1964
"Santa's Got an Airplane"	Al Jardine; Brian Wilson; Mike Love	1977	Ultimate Christmas ‡	1998
"School Day (Ring! Ring! Goes The Bell)"	Chuck Berry	1979–1980	Keepin' the Summer Alive	1980
"Sea Cruise"	Huey P. Smith #	1976	Ten Years of Harmony ‡	1981
"Seasons in the Sun"	Jacques Brel; Rod McKuen #	1970	Feel Flows ‡	2021
"Shake, Rattle & Roll"	Big Joe Turner #	1976	We Gotta Groove ‡	2026
"She Believes in Love Again" †	Bruce Johnston	1984–1985	The Beach Boys	1985
"She Knows Me Too Well"	Brian Wilson; Mike Love	1964	Today!	1965
"Shelter"	Brian Wilson; Joe Thomas	2012	That's Why God Made the Radio	2012
"Sherry She Needs Me"	Brian Wilson; Russ Titelman	1965–1976	Made in California ‡	2013
"She's Goin' Bald"	Brian Wilson; Van Dyke Parks; Mike Love	1967	Smiley Smile	1967
"She's Got Rhythm"	Brian Wilson; Mike Love; Ron Altbach	1977	M.I.U. Album	1978
"The Shift"	Brian Wilson; Mike Love	1962	Surfin' Safari	1962
"Shortenin' Bread"	traditional #	1979	L.A. (Light Album)	1979
"Short Skirts"	Brian Wilson	1976	We Gotta Groove ‡	2026
"Shut Down"	Brian Wilson; Roger Christian	1963	Surfin' U.S.A.	1963
"Shut Down, Part II"	Carl Wilson	1964	Shut Down Volume 2	1964
"Side Two"	Brian Wilson	1963	The Big Beat 1963 ‡	2013
"Sing Out a Song"	David Sandler	1971	Misc Tracks 1971 ‡	2021
"Slip On Through" †	Dennis Wilson	1969	Sunflower	1970
"Sloop John B" †	traditional, arranged by Brian Wilson #	1965	Pet Sounds	1966
"Slow Summer Dancing (One Summer Night)"	Bruce Johnston; Danny Webb	1991–1992	Summer in Paradise	1992
"Smokey Joe's Cafe"	Jerry Leiber; Mike Stoller #	1965	Beach Boys' Party! Uncovered and Unplugged ‡	2015
"Solar System"	Brian Wilson	1976	Love You	1977
"Some of Your Love"	Brian Wilson; Mike Love	1979–1980	Keepin' the Summer Alive	1980
"Sound of Free" † (originally credited to Dennis Wilson & Rumbo)	Dennis Wilson; Mike Love	1970	Non-album single	1970
"Somewhere Near Japan" †	Bruce Johnston; Mike Love; Terry Melcher; John Phillips	c. 1987–1989	Still Cruisin'	1989
"The Elements: Fire"	Brian Wilson	1966–1967	The Smile Sessions ‡	2011
"Soulful Old Man Sunshine"	Brian Wilson; Rick Henn	1969	Endless Harmony Soundtrack ‡	1998
"Soul Searchin'"	Brian Wilson; Andy Paley	1995	Made in California ‡	2013
"South Bay Surfer"	Stephen Foster; Brian Wilson; Carl Wilson; Al Jardine	1963	Surfer Girl	1963
"Spark in the Dark"		1972	Sail On Sailor – 1972 ‡	2022
"Spirit of America"	Brian Wilson; Roger Christian	1963	Little Deuce Coupe	1963
"Spring Vacation"	Brian Wilson; Mike Love; Joe Thomas	2012	That's Why God Made the Radio	2012
"Steamboat"	Dennis Wilson; Jack Rieley	1972	Holland	1973
"Still Cruisin'" †	Mike Love; Terry Melcher	c. 1987–1989	Still Cruisin'	1989
"Still I Dream of It"	Brian Wilson	1977	Good Vibrations ‡	1993
"Still Surfin'"	Mike Love; Terry Melcher	1991–1992	Summer in Paradise	1992
"Stoked"	Brian Wilson	1963	Surfin' U.S.A.	1963
"Strange Things Happen"	Mike Love; Terry Melcher	1991–1992	Summer in Paradise	1992
"Strange World"	Brian Wilson; Joe Thomas	2012	That's Why God Made the Radio	2012
"String Bass Song (Rainbows)"	Dennis Wilson	1974	1974 release ‡	2024
"Student Demonstration Time"	Jerry Leiber; Mike Stoller; Mike Love	1971	Surf's Up	1971
"Sumahama"	Mike Love	1978	L.A. (Light Album)	1979
"Summer's Gone"	Brian Wilson; Joe Thomas	2012	That's Why God Made the Radio	2012
"Summer in Paradise"	Mike Love; Terry Melcher; Craig Fall	1991–1992	Summer in Paradise	1992
"Summer Means New Love"	Brian Wilson	1965	Summer Days (And Summer Nights!!)	1965
"Summer of Love"	Mike Love; Terry Melcher	1991–1992	Summer in Paradise	1992
"Summertime Blues"	Eddie Cochran; Jerry Capehart #	1962	Surfin' Safari	1962
"Sunshine"	Brian Wilson; Mike Love	1979–1980	Keepin' the Summer Alive	1980
"Surf Jam"	Carl Wilson	1963	Surfin' U.S.A.	1963
"Surfer Girl"	Brian Wilson	1963	Surfer Girl	1963
"The Surfer Moon"	Brian Wilson	1962	Surfer Girl	1963
"Surfers Rule"	Brian Wilson; Mike Love	1963	Surfer Girl	1963
"Surfin'"	Brian Wilson; Mike Love	1961	Surfin' Safari	1961
"Surfin'" †	Brian Wilson; Mike Love	1991–1992	Summer in Paradise	1992
"Surfin' Safari" †	Brian Wilson; Mike Love	1962	Surfin' Safari	1962
"Surfin' U.S.A." †	Brian Wilson; Chuck Berry	1963	Surfin' U.S.A.	1963
"Surf's Up" †	Brian Wilson; Van Dyke Parks	1966–1971	Surf's Up	1971
"Susie Cincinnati"	Al Jardine	1969–1970	Non-album single	1970
"Sweet and Bitter"	Brian Wilson; Don Goldberg	1970	Feel Flows ‡	2021
"Sweet Sunday Kinda Love"	Brian Wilson; Mike Love	1977	M.I.U. Album	1978
"Take a Load Off Your Feet"	Al Jardine; Brian Wilson; Gary Winfrey	1970–1971	Surf's Up	1971
"Talk to Me"	Joe Seneca #	1976	15 Big Ones	1976
"Tears in the Morning" †	Bruce Johnston	1969–1970	Sunflower	1970
"Teeter Totter Love"	Jasper Daily #	1967	The Smile Sessions ‡	2011
"Telephone Backgrounds (On A Clear Day)"	Carl Wilson	1971	Misc Tracks 1971 ‡	2021
"Tell Me Why"	John Lennon; Paul McCartney #	1965	Party!	1965
"Ten Little Indians" †	Brian Wilson; Gary Usher	1962	Surfin' Safari	1962
"Ten Years of Harmony"	Bruce Johnston	1972	1972 Release ‡	2022
"That Same Song"	Brian Wilson; Mike Love	1976	15 Big Ones	1976
"That Special Feeling"	Brian Wilson	1976	We Gotta Groove ‡	2026
"That's Not Me"	Brian Wilson; Tony Asher	1966	Pet Sounds	1966
"That's Why God Made the Radio" †	Joe Thomas; Brian Wilson; Jim Peterik; Larry Millas	2012	That's Why God Made the Radio	2012
"Their Hearts Were Full of Spring"	Bobby Troup #	1967	Smiley Smile/Wild Honey (reissue) ‡	1990
"Then I Kissed Her"	Phil Spector; Ellie Greenwich; Jeff Barry #	1965	Summer Days (And Summer Nights!!)	1965
"There's No Other (Like My Baby)"	Phil Spector; Leroy Bates #	1965	Party!	1965
"A Thing or Two"	Brian Wilson; Mike Love	1967	Wild Honey	1967
"Things We Did Last Summer"	J. Styne; S. Cahn #	1963	Good Vibrations ‡	1993
"Think About The Days"	Brian Wilson; Joe Thomas	2012	That's Why God Made The Radio	2012
"This Car of Mine"	Brian Wilson; Mike Love	1964	Shut Down Volume 2	1964
"This Whole World"	Brian Wilson	1969	Sunflower	1970
"Three Blind Mice"	Brian Wilson	1965	The Smile Sessions ‡	2011
"'Til I Die"	Brian Wilson	1970–1971	Surf's Up	1971
"Ticket to Ride"	Lennon-McCartney #	1965	Beach Boys' Party! Uncovered and Unplugged ‡	2015
"Time to Get Alone"	Brian Wilson	1968	20/20	1969
"A Time to Live in Dreams"	Dennis Wilson; Stephen Kalinich	1968	Hawthorne, CA ‡	2001
"The Times They Are A-Changin'"	Bob Dylan #	1965	Party!	1965
"T M Song"	Brian Wilson	1976	15 Big Ones	1976
"The Trader"	Carl Wilson; Jack Rieley	1972	Holland	1973
"Transcendental Meditation"	Brian Wilson; Mike Love; Al Jardine	1968	Friends	1968
"Trombone Dixie"	Brian Wilson	1965	Pet Sounds (reissue) ‡	1990
"Tune L"		1967	Sunshine Tomorrow 2 – The Studio Sessions ‡	2017
"Tune X"	Carl Wilson	1967	The Smile Sessions ‡	2011
"Twist and Shout"	Phil Medley; Bert Berns #	1965	Beach Boys' Party! Uncovered and Unplugged ‡	2015
"Under the Boardwalk"	Mike Love; Artie Resnick; Kenny Young	1991–1992	Summer in Paradise	1992
"Untitled (1/25/68)"	Dennis Wilson	1968	Wake the World: The Friends Sessions ‡	2018
"Vegetables"	Brian Wilson; Van Dyke Parks	1967	Smiley Smile	1967
"Wake the World"	Brian Wilson; Al Jardine	1968	Friends	1968
"Walk On By"	Burt Bacharach; Hal David #	1968	Friends/20/20 (reissue) ‡	1990
"Walkin'"	Brian Wilson; Al Jardine	1968–1969	I Can Hear Music: The 20/20 Sessions ‡	2018
"The Warmth of the Sun"	Brian Wilson; Mike Love	1964	Shut Down Volume 2	1964
"We Got Love"	Ricky Fataar; Blondie Chaplin; Mike Love	1971	Holland 2015 Remastered iTunes bonus track ‡	2015
"We Gotta Groove"	Brian Wilson	1976	We Gotta Groove ‡	2026
"We Three Kings of Orient Are"	John Henry Hopkins #	1964	Christmas Album	1964
"Wendy"	Brian Wilson; Mike Love	1964	All Summer Long	1964
"We'll Run Away"	Brian Wilson; Gary Usher	1964	All Summer Long	1964
"We're Together Again"	Brian Wilson; Ron Wilson	1968	Friends/20/20 (reissue) ‡	1990
"Well You Know I Knew"	Dennis Wilson	1968	I Can Hear Music: The 20/20 Sessions ‡	2018
"What Is a Young Girl Made Of?" (originally credited to Kenny & the Cadets)	Bruce Morgan #	1962	Non-album single	1962
"When a Man Needs a Woman"	Brian Wilson; Carl Wilson; Dennis Wilson; Al Jardine; Steve Korthof; Jon Parks	1968	Friends	1968
"When Girls Get Together"	Brian Wilson; Mike Love	1969	Keepin' the Summer Alive	1980
"When I Grow Up (To Be a Man)" †	Brian Wilson; Mike Love	1964	Today!	1965
"Where I Belong"	Carl Wilson; Robert White Johnson	1984–1985	The Beach Boys	1985
"Where Is She?"	Brian Wilson	1969	Made in California ‡	2013
"Whistle In"	Brian Wilson	1967	Smiley Smile	1967
"White Christmas"	Irving Berlin #	1964	Christmas Album	1964
"Why"	Brian Wilson	1977	Made in California ‡	2013
"Why Do Fools Fall In Love"	Frankie Lymon; Morris Levy #	1964	Shut Down Volume 2	1964
"Why Don't They Let Us Fall in Love"	Phil Spector; Jeff Barry; Ellie Greenwich #	1980	Made in California ‡	2013
"Wild Honey" †	Brian Wilson; Mike Love	1967	Wild Honey	1967
"Wind Chimes"	Brian Wilson	1967	Smiley Smile	1967
"Winds of Change"	Ron Altbach; Ed Tuleja #	1977–1978	M.I.U. Album	1978
"Winter Symphony"	Brian Wilson	1977	Ultimate Christmas ‡	1998
"Unknown Piano/Synth Track"	Dennis Wilson	1972	1972 Release ‡	2022
"Untitled 1971 Piano Track"	Dennis Wilson	1971	Misc Tracks 1971 ‡	2021
"Untitled Demo"	Dennis Wilson; Audrey Wilson	1974	1974 release ‡	2024
"Untitled Jam / Let's Live Before We Die"	Brian Wilson	1964	Keep an Eye on Summer – The Beach Boys Sessions 1964 ‡	2014
"Wipe Out" † (with the Fat Boys)	Bob Berryhill; Pat Connolly; Jim Fuller; Ron Wilson #	1987	Still Cruisin'	1989
"With a Little Help from My Friends"	John Lennon; Paul McCartney #	1967	Rarities ‡	1983
"With Me Tonight"	Brian Wilson	1967	Smiley Smile	1967
"Wonderful"	Brian Wilson; Van Dyke Parks	1967	Smiley Smile	1967
"Wontcha Come Out Tonight"	Brian Wilson; Mike Love	1977	M.I.U. Album	1978
"Won't You Tell Me"	Murry Wilson; Brian Wilson	1971	Feel Flows ‡	2021
"(Wouldn't It Be Nice to) Live Again"	Dennis Wilson; Stan Shapiro	1971	Made in California ‡	2013
"Wouldn't It Be Nice" †	Brian Wilson; Tony Asher; Mike Love	1966	Pet Sounds	1966
"You Need a Mess of Help to Stand Alone" †	Brian Wilson; Jack Rieley	1971–1972	Carl and the Passions – "So Tough"	1972
"You Never Give Me Your Money"	John Lennon; Paul McCartney#	1969	Feel Flows ‡	2021
"You Still Believe in Me"	Brian Wilson; Tony Asher	1966	Pet Sounds	1966
"A Young Man Is Gone"	Bobby Troup; Mike Love	1963	Little Deuce Coupe	1963
"Your Summer Dream"	Brian Wilson; Bob Norberg	1963	Surfer Girl	1964
"You're So Good to Me"	Brian Wilson; Mike Love	1965	Summer Days (And Summer Nights!!)	1965
"You're As Cool As Can Be"	Brian Wilson	1968	Wake the World: The Friends Sessions ‡	2018
"You're Still A Mystery"	Brian Wilson; Andy Paley	1995	Made in California ‡	2013
"You're Welcome"	Brian Wilson	1966	Non-album single	1967
"You've Got to Hide Your Love Away"	John Lennon; Paul McCartney #	1965	Party!	1965
"You've Lost That Lovin' Feelin'"	Phil Spector; Barry Mann; Cynthia Weil #	1976	Made in California ‡	2013

== Bibliography ==
- Badman, Keith (October 2004). The Beach Boys: The Definitive Diary of America's Greatest Band on Stage and in the Studio. Backbeat Books. ISBN 978-0-87930-818-6.
- Elliott, Brad (November 2003). Surf's Up! The Beach Boys on Record, 1961-1981. Surf's Up Books. ISBN 978-0-9727686-1-0.
