= Beach Boy (disambiguation) =

Beach Boy is a 1997 novel by Ardashir Vakil.

Beach Boy or Beachboy may also refer to:

- "Beach Boy", a 1965 single by Ronny & the Daytonas
- "Beach Boy", a 2022 single by Benee
- Beachboy, a 2014 album by McCafferty

== See also ==
- The Beach Boys (disambiguation)
- Lifeguard, a rescuer who supervises swimmers etc., including on a beach
- Cabana boy, a male attendant who serves the guests of a hotel, often on a beach
- Beach Boii, American rapper (born 1995)
