= Good Timin' =

Good Timin' may refer to:

- "Good Timin'" (The Beach Boys song), a song by The Beach Boys
- "Good Timin'" (Jimmy Jones song), a UK #1 by Jimmy Jones
