= L.A. (Light Album) =

1979 album by the Beach Boys

Studio album by the Beach Boys
- Released: March 16, 1979
- Recorded: April 29, 1974 – January 24, 1979
- Studios: Brother (Santa Monica); Western; Britannia; Sounds Good; Westlake (Los Angeles); Super Sound (Monterey); Criteria (Miami); Kaye-Smith (Seattle); Caribou (Nederland)
- Length: 41:33
- Label: Brother/Caribou/CBS
- Producers: Bruce Johnston; the Beach Boys; James William Guercio

The Beach Boys chronology
| M.I.U. Album (1978) | L.A. (Light Album) (1979) | Keepin' the Summer Alive (1980) |

Singles from L.A. (Light Album)
- 1. "Here Comes the Night” b/w “Baby Blue" Released: February 19, 1979; 2. "Good Timin'” b/w “Love Surrounds Me" Released: April 1979; 3. "Lady Lynda” b/w “Full Sail" Released: August 1979

L.A. (Light Album) is the 23rd studio album by the American rock band the Beach Boys, released on March 16, 1979, and their first issued through CBS Records. Recorded during a period of acrimony between the band members, it was a critical and commercial failure, peaking at number 100 in the U.S. and number 32 in the UK.

The album largely consists of solo recordings by the individual band members, including two from Dennis Wilson ("Love Surrounds Me" and "Baby Blue") that were lifted from his unreleased second solo album, Bambu. Brian Wilson was not present for much of the L.A. sessions. The production was credited to returning Beach Boy Bruce Johnston, the band itself, and their manager James William Guercio.

L.A. produced three singles: an 11-minute disco rerecording of "Here Comes the Night" from their 1967 album Wild Honey, the Brian and Carl Wilson collaboration "Good Timin'", and Al Jardine's "Lady Lynda". "Here Comes the Night" and "Good Timin'" charted at numbers 44 and 40, respectively, while "Lady Lynda" was a top 10 hit in several territories abroad, including the UK.

== Background and production ==
In the late 1970s, the Beach Boys were in a state of professional and personal disarray, with the Wilson brothers struggling with drug abuse and, alongside Mike Love, each facing an imminent or ongoing divorce from their wives. In March 1977, the group signed an $8 million deal with CBS Records, with their first album expected for delivery before January 1, 1978. Dennis Wilson released his first solo album, Pacific Ocean Blue, in September 1977, after which the band recorded M.I.U. Album to finish off their contract with Reprise. From January 11 to August 22, 1978, members of the band held sessions at various studios in Los Angeles. In Dennis' case, he was focused on recording his second solo album, Bambu.

The Beach Boys had missed their CBS album deadline and, from February to March, embarked on a three-week tour of Australia and New Zealand. (Note: The band had successfully negotiated a deadline extension. Martell recalled, "They were making money because Capitol was putting out repackages out the kazoo. They were making a lot of money on tour and making money from two companies... so they didn't feel under pressure to produce an album.") While the tour was a commercial success, tensions within the band were disastrous and nearly resulted in another breakup when the group discovered Dennis had purchased heroin for Brian Wilson with funds allegedly acquired from Carl Wilson. During an argument regarding this incident, Brian's bodyguard Rocky Pamplin punched Carl in the face. Band manager and business advisor Stephen Love, who felt that Pamplin's actions were justified, was subsequently fired. In June, Dennis declared that the band's forthcoming album Adult/Child, recorded before the M.I.U. sessions, would not be released.

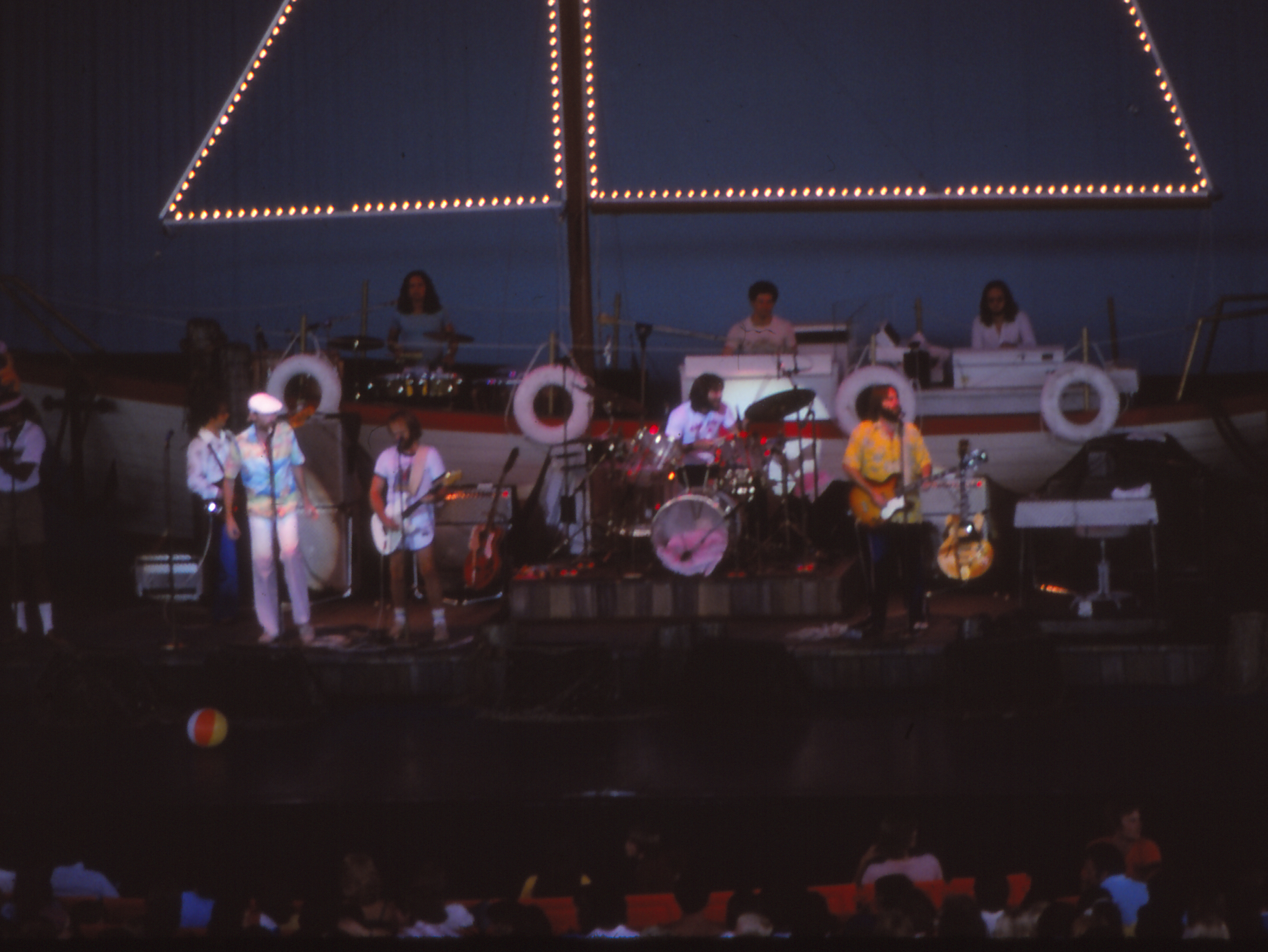
The Beach Boys performing a concert in Michigan shortly before embarking on sessions at Criteria Studios in Miami (August 1978)

After returning to Los Angeles, Brian ran away on a days-long drug binge and was later discovered lying under a tree at Balboa Park in San Diego without shoes, money, or a wallet. Biographer Steven Gaines writes that Brian was then admitted to a local hospital, and when discharged, immediately joined his bandmates at Criteria Studios in Miami, where they were recording their long-overdue first album for CBS. The sessions at Criteria lasted from August 28 to September 1, after which they compiled a tape of their work for CBS. (Note: Doe states that the tape consisted of "California Feeling", "Brian's Back", "I'm Begging You Please", "Calendar Girl", "Baby Blue" (the Bambu version), "Looking Down The Coast/Monterey", "Shortenin' Bread", "Santa Ana Winds" (original version), and "Good Timin'".)

Peter Ames Carlin, another biographer, supports that sessions had already been underway in Miami before Brian rejoined the group, but Mike's 2016 memoir, Good Vibrations, states the band had not recorded at Miami or delivered music to CBS before Brian and the other members were summoned to meet with label president Walter Yetnikoff: "When [Yetnikoff] finally walked in, bearded and rumpled, he leaned against his desk and said, 'Gentlemen, I think I've been fucked.'" (Note: According to Love, "Brian raised his voice and said, 'Mr. Yetnikoff, I've got some ideas for some songs, and I want to do them at the Criteria Studios in Miami.' 'Okay,' Yetnikoff said. 'We'll be down there in two weeks.' Brian defused the crisis, and we traveled to Miami.") Carlin writes that the Miami sessions and subsequent preview of their songs to CBS "did not go well". CBS vice president Tony Martell remembered, "We sat there and listened to the tunes. ... At one point, it was a little volatile, because of what we heard. They told us it was one of their finest efforts." Brian's other bodyguard, Stan Love, said that when Yetnikoff heard the tapes, "he turned to the group and said, 'I think I've been fucked.'"

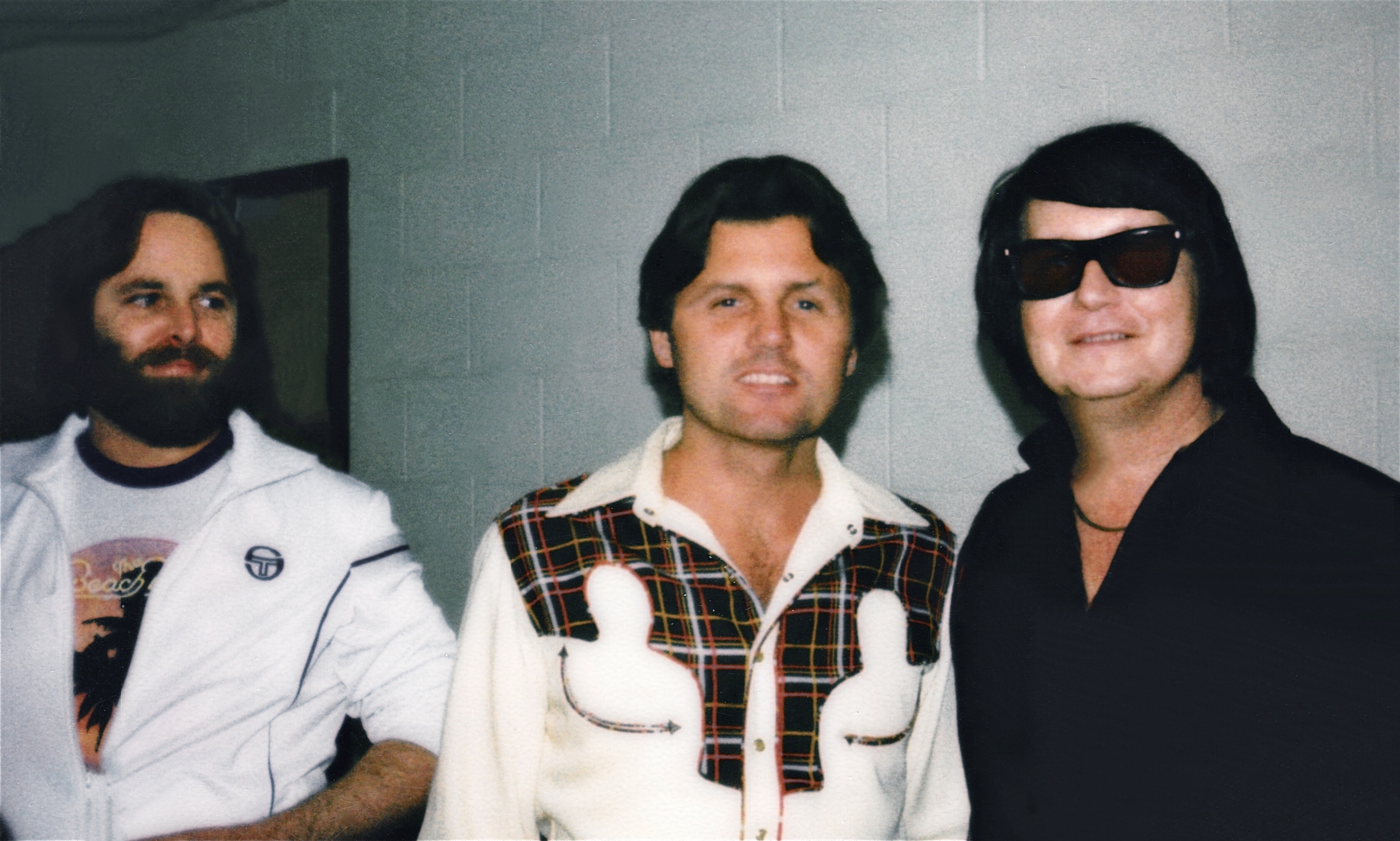
Carl Wilson and Bruce Johnston backstage with Roy Orbison, late 1979

The Wilson brothers' cousin Steve Korthof recalled, "Brian was real weird then, real quiet, not saying much. Real depressed. I think he just realized he wasn't going to be able to pick up the slack. Brian eventually suggested that Bruce Johnston be brought back in to help produce the album." His bandmates agreed to the suggestion based on the strength of Johnston's success writing the 1975 hit "I Write the Songs". According to Gaines, "When everyone else returned to Los Angeles to continue recording at Western Studios, Brian wanted to stay in Florida by himself. The group agreed that this was out of the question and forced him to return to L.A."

Sessions resumed at various other studios from September 18, 1978, to January 24, 1979. In between these sessions, Mike also recorded two unreleased solo albums, First Love and Country Love. Brian, who is barely present on L.A., was institutionalized at Brotzman Memorial Hospital from November 1978 to early 1979 following an incident in which he attacked his doctor during a visit. In Carlin's description, "if Brian sang a note anywhere on the album, his voice is so far down in the mix as to be completely unidentifiable."

== Songs and outtakes ==
Love described L.A. as "mainly a collection of solo efforts". These included songs from Mike Love's unreleased album First Love and Dennis Wilson's in progress album Bambu. The album's centerpiece was "Here Comes the Night", an 11-minute disco reworking of an original R&B song that the band had released on their 1967 album Wild Honey. Dennis was opposed to the recording, and Brian did not participate. Another older song, "Good Timin'", had dated from the band's aborted 1974 sessions at Caribou Ranch. Brian's rendition of "Shortenin' Bread" featured Dennis on lead, and was a different recording from the version on the unreleased Adult/Child album.

Among the newer songs, Carl contributed three – "Angel Come Home", "Full Sail", and "Goin' South" – that he wrote with songwriter Geoffrey Cushing-Murray, whom he had met through touring member Billy Hinsche. Dennis' two songs – "Baby Blue" and "Love Surrounds Me" – were lifted from Bambu. Biographer Jon Stebbins states that the songs were included at the insistence of Dennis' bandmates, and quotes music journalist Domenic Priore, who surmised, "They obviously didn't have enough good material for their debut album on their new label, so they nicked some of the better [songs from Bambu]".

Love's "Sumahama" is lyrically inspired by his fiancée at the time, a woman named Sumako, and is "about a young girl who wants to go with her mother to a place called 'Sumahama' in search of her father." Sumahama was re-recorded from the version recorded on First Love. Although some of the lyrics are in Japanese, Sumako was of Korean descent. Al Jardine's "Lady Lynda" is a tribute to his then-wife that is based musically on Bach's "Jesu, Joy of Man's Desiring".

Among the outtakes, a re-recorded version of "Santa Ana Winds" appeared on their next album, Keepin' the Summer Alive (1980), "Brian's Back" (another First Love outtake) was released on the 1998 compilation Endless Harmony, and "California Feelin'" was released on the 2013 compilation Made in California. "Rock Plymouth Rock/Roll" [sic], a song from the band's unfinished Smile album, was also considered for inclusion as the opening track of L.A.. Still-unreleased tracks from the L.A. sessions include "Looking Down the Coast/Monterey", "I'm Begging You Please", "Basketball Rock", "Bowling", "There's a Feeling Through the Air", and renditions of "Calendar Girl" and "Drip Drop".

== Packaging ==
In the liner notes, it is explained that the L.A. (Light Album) title refers to the "awareness of, and the presence of, God here in this world as an ongoing loving reality". The initials also allude to Los Angeles, the band's native home. Carlin writes that the title "evoked both Los Angeles and the city's long-standing position as a capital of vaguely New Age religions".

The sleeve design features an assortment of illustrations drawn individually by Gary Meyer ("The Beach Boys"), Jim Heimann ("Light Album"), Drew Struzan ("Sumahama"), Dave McMacken ("Lady Lynda"), Steve Carver ("Full Sail"), Nick Taggart ("Here Comes the Night"), Howard Carriker ("Angel Come Home"), Peter Green ("Good Timin'"), Neon Park ("Baby Blue"), Blue Beach ("Shortenin' Bread"), Mick Haggerty ("Here Comes the Night"), and William Stout ("Goin' South"). Troy Lane is credited as "cover artist", while Gary Meyer is credited with art direction and design.

== Release ==
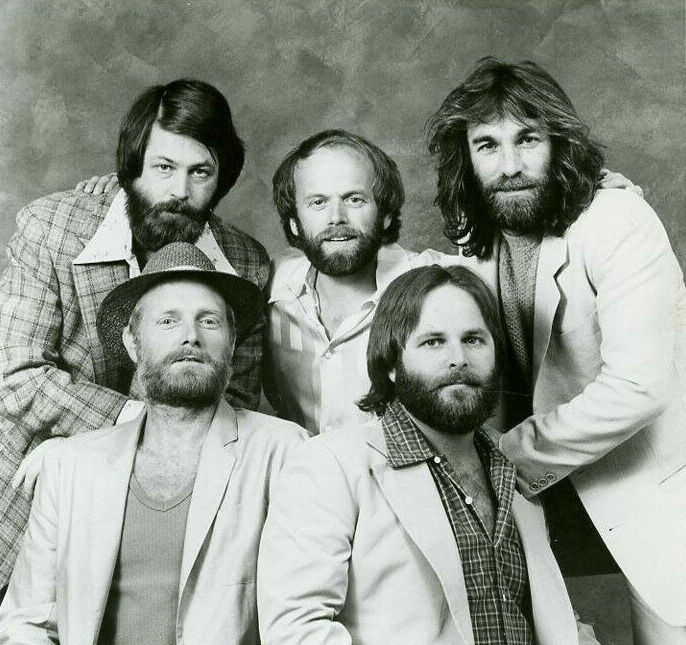
The group at a 1979 photoshoot.

Lead single "Here Comes the Night" (backed with "Baby Blue") was issued on February 19, 1979, and peaked at number 44. L.A. (Light Album) followed on March 16 and reached number 100 in the U.S. The next month, "Good Timin'" (backed with "Love Surrounds Me") was issued as a second single and reached number 40, becoming the band's first top 40 hit since "It's OK" in 1976. Stebbins summarized this juncture in the band's career,

Dennis's fans hated disco and thought Mike's songs were silly. Mike's fans thought Dennis's voice was awful and found his songs too depressing. Brian's fans wanted more Brian. ... Despite being heralded with the fanfare of a major-label debut, the LP was no more than a reflection of a band in disarray. No one agreed on anything, and nothing complemented anything else. Now the Beach Boys would have to go on the road and try to sell a product that nobody wanted.

In April, the group appeared on The Midnight Special, where they performed their past hits alongside "Baby Blue", "Here Comes the Night", and "Angel Come Home". In August, "Lady Lynda" (backed with "Full Sail") was issued as the album's third and final single. It failed to chart in the U.S., but was a top 10 hit in several territories abroad, including the UK.

== Critical reception ==
Retrospective professional ratings
Review scores
| Source | Rating |
|---|---|
| AllMusic | 2/5 stars |
| Blender | 2/5 stars |
| Christgau's Record Guide | C+ |
| The Encyclopedia of Popular Music | 3/5 stars |
| MusicHound Rock | woof! |
| The Rolling Stone Album Guide | 1/5 stars |

The album received mostly unfavorable reviews from music critics. In his review for Rolling Stone, Dave Marsh wrote, "The Beach Boys have not made great rock music since Wild Honey [and have not] made competent pop music since Holland", concluding that the album "is worse than awful. It is irrelevant." The New York Times concluded that "the songs here are better than some recent albums by the group; they're gentle, tuneful and innocently charming... But they're pretty trivial, too."

AllMusic reviewer John Bush felt, "The Beach Boys ended the decade by releasing the worst album of their career", describing it as "yet another oddball attempt to push the Beach Boys into the contemporary mainstream despite their many songwriting and production flaws." Blender's Douglas Wolk decreed that L.A. was "practically a self-parody" with "Here Comes the Night" being the only enjoyable track.

Jeff Tamarkin, who penned liner notes for the 2000 CD reissue, said of the album: "There is undeniable brilliance here if one dares to look." Stebbins praised the Wilson brothers' contributions and derided the songs by Love and Jardine, calling the album "an uneven and disappointing affair. If you liked one part of it, then you were sure to hate others." Carlin opined that L.A. was "a big improvement over M.I.U.. ... the album's strength came largely from its diversity of voices". Critic Richard Williams referred to "Angel Come Home" as "the most beautifully textured and exquisitely pain-racked white soul music ever made".

== Track listing ==
Side one
| No. | Title | Writer(s) | Lead vocal(s) | Length |
|---|---|---|---|---|
| 1. | "Good Timin'" | Brian Wilson, Carl Wilson | Carl Wilson | 2:12 |
| 2. | "Lady Lynda" | Johann Sebastian Bach, Al Jardine, Ron Altbach | Al Jardine | 3:58 |
| 3. | "Full Sail" | C. Wilson, Geoffrey Cushing-Murray | C. Wilson | 2:56 |
| 4. | "Angel Come Home" | C. Wilson, Cushing-Murray | Dennis Wilson | 3:39 |
| 5. | "Love Surrounds Me" | Dennis Wilson, Cushing-Murray | D. Wilson | 3:41 |
| 6. | "Sumahama" | Mike Love | Mike Love | 4:07 |

Side two
| No. | Title | Writer(s) | Lead vocal(s) | Length |
|---|---|---|---|---|
| 1. | "Here Comes the Night" | B. Wilson, Love | C. Wilson | 10:51 |
| 2. | "Baby Blue" | D. Wilson, Gregg Jakobson, Karen Lamm | C. Wilson and D. Wilson | 3:25 |
| 3. | "Goin' South" | C. Wilson, Cushing-Murray | C. Wilson | 3:16 |
| 4. | "Shortenin' Bread" | Traditional; arranged by B. Wilson | C. Wilson and D. Wilson | 2:49 |
| Total length: | | | | 41:33 |

== Personnel ==
Credits from Craig Slowinski.

The Beach Boys

- Al Jardine – lead (2) and backing vocals (1, 2, 7, 10); 12-string guitar (2)
- Bruce Johnston – backing vocals (all tracks); Fender Rhodes (1, 2?, 10)
- Mike Love – lead (6) and backing vocals (1–4, 6, 7, 9, 10)
- Brian Wilson – backing vocals (2?, 4); piano (1, 10); harpsichord and organ (1); Moog synthesizer (10)
- Carl Wilson – lead (1, 3, 7–10) and backing vocals (all tracks); guitars (1, 4, 10?); Fender Rhodes (3, 9); Wurlitzer electric piano (4)
- Dennis Wilson – lead (4, 5, 8, 10) and backing vocals (5, 8); Oberheim synthesizers (5, 8); Fender Rhodes and Moog synthesizer (5); piano (8); drums (1, 10); additional drums and timpani (5)

Touring members

- Michael Andreas – saxophone (10)
- Ed Carter – guitars (2, 5); bass guitar (2)
- Bobby Figueroa – drums (2, 4, 5, 8); percussion (2); backing vocals (3)
- Billy Hinsche – guitars (10)
- Mike Meros – Clavinet and Wurlitzer electric piano (7)
- Carli Muñoz – piano (5)
- Rod Novak – saxophone (8, 10)
- Sterling Smith – harpsichord and possible Fender Rhodes (2); Hammond organ (10)

Guests

- Curt Boettcher – guitars (7)
- Geoffrey Cushing-Murray – backing vocals (3)
- James William Guercio – bass guitar (1, 3, 10)
- Christine McVie – backing vocals (5)

Additional session musicians

- Robert Adcock – cello (8)
- Murray Adler – violin (2, 3, 6, 7, 9)
- Mike Baird – drums and percussion (7)
- Roberleigh Barnhart – cello (6, 9)
- Myer Bello – viola (6, 7, 9)
- Arnold Belnick – violin (2, 3)
- Samuel Boghossian – viola (2, 3)
- Jimmy Bond – double bass (2, 3)
- Alfred Breuning – violin (6, 9)
- Verlye Mills Brilhart – harp (2, 3)
- Joe Chemay – bass guitar (5, 7); additional bass guitar (8, 10)
- Ronald Cooper – cello (4)
- Isabelle Daskoff – violin (2, 3, 6, 8, 9)
- Jim Decker – French horn (2, 3, 6)
- Harold Dicterow – violins (2, 3)
- Earle Dumler – oboe (6)
- Marcia Van Dyke – violin (7)
- Arni Egilsson – double bass (8)
- Jesse Ehrlich – cello (2, 3, 6, 7, 9)
- Gene Estes – Clavinet and vibraphone (7); percussion (4)
- Bob Esty – synthesizer and percussion (7)
- Victor Feldman – percussion (7)
- Henry Ferber – violin (2, 3, 7)
- Bernard Fleischer – saxophone (10)
- Richard Folsom – violin (2, 3, 7, 8)
- Steve Forman – percussion (3–5)
- Bryan Garofalo – bass guitar (6)
- James Getzoff – violin (2, 3, 7, 8)
- Harris Goldman – violin (2, 3, 8)
- Anne Goodman – cello (4)
- Allan Harshman – viola (7)
- Igor Horoshevsky – cello (6, 9)
- Bill House – guitar (6)
- Harry Hyams – viola (8)
- Dick Hyde – trombones and bass trombone (2)
- William Hymanson – viola (8)
- Raymond Kelley – cello (2, 3, 7, 8)
- Jerome Kessler – cello (2, 3)
- Chuck Kirkpatrick – guitar (10)
- William Kurasch – violin (2, 3, 6–9)
- Bernard Kundell – violin (6, 9)
- Neil LeVang – dobro (5)
- Jeff Legg – guitar (8)
- Gayle Levant – harp (6, 8, 9)
- Joel Levin – cello (8)
- Marvin Limonick – violin (2, 3, 7)
- Charles Loper – French horn (2, 3)
- Edgar Lustgarten – cello (4)
- Kathleen Lustgarten – cello (4)
- Joy Lyle – violin (6, 7, 9)
- Jimmy Lyon – lead guitar (10)
- Arthur Maebe – French horn (2, 3)
- Gary Mallaber – drums (3, 9); timpani (3); shaker (9); percussion (4)
- Peter Mercurio – double bass (8)
- Jay Migliori – flutes (2)
- David Montagu – violin (7)
- Ira Newborn – guitars (7)
- Michael Nowak – viola (7)
- Brian O'Connor – French horn (6)
- Earl Palmer – drums (6)
- Dennis F. Parker – bass guitar (4)
- Judy Perett – cello (7)
- Joel Peskin – alto saxophone (7, 9); flute (6)
- Ray Pizzi – bassoons (2)
- Jack Redmond – French horn (2, 3)
- William Reichenbach – French horn (2, 3)
- Lyle Ritz – double bass (2, 3, 9)
- Jay Rosen – violin (2, 3, 6, 9)
- Nathan Ross – violin (7)
- David Schwartz – viola (2, 3, 7)
- Fred Selden – saxophone (10)
- Sid Sharp – violin (6, 7, 9)
- John Philip Shenale – Oberheim synthesizers (4, 5)
- Harry Shlutz – cello (2, 3, 7)
- Linn Subotnick – viola (2, 3, 7, 8)
- Barbara Thomason – viola (6, 9)
- Wayne Tweed – bass guitar (8)
- Tommy Vig – vibraphone (6)
- Wah Wah Watson – lead guitar (7)
- Jai Winding – Fender Rhodes (6)
- Herschel Wise – viola (2, 3, 6–8)
- Dan Wyman – synthesizer programming (7)
- Tibor Zelig – violin (2, 3, 6–9)
- Richie Zito – lead guitar (7)

== Charts ==
Chart performance for L.A. (Light Album)
| Chart (1979) | Peak position |
|---|---|
| Dutch Album Chart | 43 |
| UK Top 40 Album Chart | 32 |
| US Billboard Top LPs & Tape | 100 |

== Bibliography ==
- Badman, Keith (2004). The Beach Boys: The Definitive Diary of America's Greatest Band, on Stage and in the Studio. Backbeat Books. ISBN 978-0-87930-818-6.
- Carlin, Peter Ames (2006). Catch a Wave: The Rise, Fall, and Redemption of the Beach Boys' Brian Wilson. Rodale. ISBN 978-1-59486-320-2.
- Dillon, Mark (2012). Fifty Sides of the Beach Boys: The Songs That Tell Their Story. ECW Press. ISBN 978-1-77090-198-8.
- Gaines, Steven (1986). Heroes and Villains: The True Story of The Beach Boys. New York: Da Capo Press. ISBN 0306806479.
- Love, Mike (2016). Good Vibrations: My Life as a Beach Boy. Penguin Publishing Group. ISBN 978-0-698-40886-9.
- Stebbins, Jon (2000). Dennis Wilson: The Real Beach Boy. ECW Press. ISBN 978-1-55022-404-7.
- White, Timothy (1996). The Nearest Faraway Place: Brian Wilson, the Beach Boys, and the Southern Californian Experience. Macmillan. ISBN 0333649370.
