= The Beach Boys (disambiguation) =

The Beach Boys are an American rock group formed in 1961.

The Beach Boys may also refer to:

- The Beach Boys (album), by The Beach Boys, 1985
- "Beach Boys", a song by Weezer from the 2017 album Pacific Daydream
- The Beach Boys and the California Myth, a 1978 biography of the Beach Boys by David Leaf, revised in 1985 as The Beach Boys
- The Beach Boys, a 1979 biography of the band by Byron Preiss
- The Beach Boys (film), a 2024 documentary of the band

== See also ==
- Beach Boy (disambiguation)
- The Beach Boys live performances
- The Beach Boys discography
- List of songs recorded by the Beach Boys
- The Beach Boys' unreleased and bootleg recordings
