= Ted Coombs =

American technology author

Ted Coombs (born 1954) is an American technology author, futurist, artist, and scientist. He set a Guinness World Record for roller skating across the United States in 1979.

== Work ==
Born on June 19, 1954, as Ronald Alvin Schlemeyer, he was adopted on July 11, 1956, as Theodore James Coombs. He was an early author of the "...for Dummies" series as well as over a dozen computer books, and a portrait artist. He is a programmer for CognitiveAI, working on the development of AI systems capable of cognition. He developed the TedAgents reasoning system and information security expert at Risk Mitigate.

== Roller Skating ==
In early 1979, Ted was living and working in the Hermosa Beach Animal Hospital in Hermosa Beach, California. One evening, while practicing roller skating, he had the idea that he would like to roller skate across the United States to protest the 1979 energy crisis that was causing long gasoline lines and gas rationing in 1979. He contacted KZLA Radio in Los Angeles, then an adult contemporary format station, and told them about his idea. They contacted United Artists who was then marketing Lorimar Productions' first movie, Americathon, a movie starring Harvey Korman and John Ritter. United Artists saw this as a way to promote the movie and sponsored his venture.

He later learned that Clinton Shaw already roller-skated across both Canada and the United States breaking world records. He decided to skate further, returning across the United States. He left in May 1979 from a Hollywood gas station, converted to appear like a restaurant attended by stars from the movie, including Harvey Korman, to begin his trip across the U.S. and back. He was followed by a van driven by Brian Douglas, his friend and musical partner.

Along the way he broke the record for miles skated in one day by skating 120 miles (139.121 kilometers) non-stop from Breckenridge, Texas into Dallas, Texas. He headed North and was given a parade in Chicago followed by Playboy Bunnies skating in costume to greet Jane Byrne, the mayor of Chicago. (Dorothy Stratten, Playboy's Playmate of the Month for August 1979 and Playmate of the Year for 1980, appeared uncredited in the movie Americathon as a stage dancer.) He headed East again through Columbus, Ohio and Pittsburgh, Pennsylvania. He fell for the first time in the dangerous curve fronting the Pennsylvania restaurant Noah's Ark on a hill where you can view several states. With only minor injuries, he headed to Washington, D.C., where he spent the day with Speaker of the House Tip O'Neill, presenting him with a pair of roller skates.

The biggest event on his trip was entering New York City. The New York Tunnel Commission closed the Lincoln Tunnel for his trip into the city. Accompanied by a police escort, he was the first person to roller skate through the Lincoln Tunnel. He was the guest of honor at a Central Park concert given by Eddie Money and later attended the premier of the movie Americathon.

His trip was not complete. While he had fulfilled his agreement with United Artists to make it to New York, his goal was the distance record. He headed south to Richmond, Virginia and then west into Missouri, where on September 13, 1979, he broke the world distance record in the small town of Mt. Sterling, Missouri. That night, the driver of the van (someone other than Douglas who had left earlier in the trip) stole the van, abandoning Coombs in Mt. Sterling. Ted continued skating into Sedalia, Missouri, where roller-skate rink owners in Missouri and Leavenworth, Kansas, had skate-a-thons and raised money for his continued trip. Coombs continued until Yates Center, Kansas where he stopped his trip, having skated 5,193 miles (8,375.33 kilometers). He took a bus to Las Vegas in order to retrieve the van and then returned to his home in Hermosa Beach.

== Publications ==
- Ted Coombs; Jason Coombs (March 1995). dBASE for Windows programming for dummies. IDG Books. ISBN 978-1-56884-215-8.
- Ted Coombs; Jason Coombs (1995). PowerBuilder 4.0 Power Toolkit. Ventana. ISBN 978-1-56604-224-6.
- Jason Coombs; Ted Coombs (March 1995). PowerBuilder 4 programming for dummies. IDG Books. ISBN 978-1-56884-325-4.
- Ted Coombs; Jason Coombs; Donald Brewer (August 23, 1996). ActiveX sourcebook: build and ActiveX-based Web site. Wiley Computing Publishing. ISBN 978-0-471-16714-3.
- Ted Coombs; Jason Coombs; Donald Brewer (1996). Netscape Livewire sourcebook: Create and Manage a Java-based Web site. Wiley Computing Publishing. ISBN 978-0-471-15605-5.
- Jason Coombs; Ted Coombs (March 23, 1998). Setting up an Internet site for dummies. IDG Books Worldwide. ISBN 978-0-7645-0358-0.
- Ted Coombs; Roderico DeLeon (July 2000). Icq Fyi: Instant Communications Online : Your Q&A Guide to ICQ. Muska & Lipman. ISBN 978-1-929685-04-2.
- Ted Coombs; Jon Campbell (April 25, 2001). 1001 Visual Basic programmer's tips. Onword Press/Thomson Learning. ISBN 978-1-884133-93-0.
- Ted Coombs (May 13, 2002). Programming with C#.NET. OnWord Press. ISBN 978-0-7668-5008-8.
- Ted Coombs; Roderico DeLeon (July 24, 2002). Basic Home Networking. Cengage Learning. ISBN 978-0-7668-6180-0.
- Ted Coombs; Roderico DeLeon (2007). Google Power Tools Bible. Wiley. ISBN 978-0-470-09712-0.

== See also ==
- Josh Brunty
