= Americathon =

1979 film by Neal Israel

- US VHS cover for the film
- Directed by: Neal Israel
- Written by: Phil Proctor & Peter Bergman (play and adaptation); Neal Israel & Michael Mislove & Monica Johnson (screenplay)
- Produced by: Joe Roth
- Starring: John Ritter; Harvey Korman; Peter Riegert; Fred Willard; Jay Leno; Chief Dan George
- Cinematography: Gerald Hirschfeld
- Edited by: John C. Howard
- Music by: Tom Scott
- Production company: Lorimar
- Distributed by: United Artists
- Release date: August 10, 1979 (US)
- Running time: 86 min.
- Country: United States
- Language: English
- Budget: $2,200,000
- Box office: $6,171,763

Americathon (also known as Americathon 1998) is a 1979 American science fiction comedy film directed by Neal Israel and starring John Ritter, Fred Willard, Peter Riegert, Harvey Korman, and Nancy Morgan, with narration by George Carlin. It is based on a play by Firesign Theatre members Phil Proctor and Peter Bergman. The movie includes appearances by Jay Leno, Meat Loaf, Tommy Lasorda, and Chief Dan George, with a musical performance by Elvis Costello.

== Plot ==
In the (then-near future) year 1998, the United States has run out of oil. Many Americans are living in their now-stationary cars and using nonpowered means of transportation, such as jogging, riding bicycles, and rollerskating. Tracksuits have become a common attire, and paper money has lost all its value. All business transactions are now conducted in gold; even a coin-operated elevator explicitly states "Gold Coins Only."

In the search for leadership, Americans elect Chet Roosevelt President of the United States. Roosevelt, a "cosmically inspired" former governor of California, is modeled on California governor Jerry Brown. Despite wearing a three-piece tracksuit with a vest, Roosevelt shares little in common with historical figures like Theodore Roosevelt or Franklin D. Roosevelt, apart from his name.

Roosevelt, an overly optimistic man who frequently quotes positive affirmation slogans, organizes a series of highly publicized fundraising events, all of which ultimately fail. His attention shifts to pursuing a relationship with Vietnamese American pop superstar Mouling Jackson. Real financial assistance comes in the form of loans from a cartel of Native Americans led by billionaire Sam Birdwater, who controls Nike (styled as National Indian Knitting Enterprises during the film's release when they were still emerging as a company).

The federal government, now headquartered in "The Western White House," a sub-leased condominium in Marina del Rey, California, faces national bankruptcy. The country is in danger of being foreclosed and repossessed when Birdwater publicly reveals on national television that he lent America billions of dollars and demands repayment. The alternative is foreclosure, with the country reverting to its original owners. Birdwater justifies his stance, stating, "Hey, I have to eat, too. Does that make me a bad guy?"

In desperation, Roosevelt hires young television consultant Eric McMerkin to help produce a national raffle. However, they eventually decide that the only way to raise enough money to save America is to run a national telethon. They enlist the services of vapid TV celebrity Monty Rushmore to host it. Meanwhile, presidential adviser Vincent Vanderhoff secretly plots to ensure the telethon's failure. His goal is to allow representatives of the United Hebrab Republic, formed by the merger of Israel and the Arab states, to purchase what remains of the country when Birdwater forecloses.

== Cast ==
- John Ritter as President Chet Roosevelt
- Harvey Korman as Monty Rushmore
- Peter Riegert as Eric McMerkin
- Fred Willard as Vincent Vanderhoff
- Chief Dan George as Sam Birdwater
- Zane Buzby as Mouling Jackson
- Nancy Morgan as Lucy Beth
- Meat Loaf as Roy Budnitz
- Elvis Costello as the Earl of Manchester
- Tommy Lasorda as Jimmy Dunphy
- Jay Leno as Larry Miller
- Howard Hesseman as Kip Margolis
- Cybill Shepherd as Gold Girl
- Allan Arbus as Moishe Weitzman
- Jimmy Weldon as Big Jim, VP Research
- David Opatoshu as Abdul Muhammad
- George Carlin as the Narrator

Dorothy Stratten appears, uncredited and in a brief non-speaking role, in a Playboy bunny style outfit during a scene where Meat Loaf's character donates blood. The Del Rubio triplets can be seen performing "America the Beautiful" behind several posing bodybuilders. Director Neal Israel has a cameo as a protesting rabbi holding a picket sign reading "The President Is a Yutz" (Yiddish for "a stupid, clueless person").

== Production ==
John Carradine was cast as "Uncle Sam", but his scenes did not make the final cut.

The soundtrack album, released August 18, 1979, features "It's a Beautiful Day" by The Beach Boys, "Crawling to the USA" by Elvis Costello and "Get a Move On" by Eddie Money.

In a scene that features a song by Vietnamese singer Mouling Jackson (Zane Buzby, better known as a TV director and philanthropist), a large poster of actor Burt Kwouk can be seen. The photo is actually taken from the 1968 film The Shoes of the Fisherman, in which Kwouk played Chinese leader Chairman Peng.

In a scene where Eric McMerkin is reading a list of "Government Approved" performers, the names of "Proctor & Bergman" (the co-authors of the original play) can be seen fifth on the list, credited as "Comics." Peter Bergman and Phil Proctor were members of the satirical comedy performance group Firesign Theatre.

== Marketing ==
To promote the movie, Ted Coombs roller-skated across the United States and back and gained a place in the Guinness Book of World Records. A photo novel of the movie was released in 1979, and the musical soundtrack was released on both vinyl and audiocassette by Lorimar Records.

=== Soundtrack ===
Side One
No.	Title	Performer(s)	Length
1.	"It's a Beautiful Day"	The Beach Boys	4:32
2.	"Get a Move On"	Eddie Money	4:56
3.	"Open Up Your Heart"	Eddie Money	3:55
4.	"(I Don't Want to Go to) Chelsea"	Elvis Costello	3:08
5.	"Crawling to the U.S.A."	Elvis Costello	2:54

Side Two
No.	Title	Performer(s)	Length
1.	"Without Love"	Nick Lowe	2:27
2.	"Car Wars"	Tom Scott	4:05
3.	"Don't You Ever Say No"	Zane Buzby	3:21
4.	"Gold"	Harvey Korman	6:32

== Reception ==
Roger Ebert gave the movie half of one star out of four and called it "a puerile exploitation of one very thin joke during 98 very long minutes." On his Sneak Previews program with Gene Siskel, Ebert said, "At times, it is a savage affront to the intelligence," and "It's not funny. It's one of the low points of my entire movie-going career." Janet Maslin of The New York Times wrote "The premise of Americathon is strong enough to sustain a 15-minute skit, but the movie has the ill fortune to drag on for an hour and a half." Dale Pollock of Variety stated "With a slow 85 minutes of Americathon to endure, film audience may go out and contribute to a fund to stop more pix like this from being made." Gene Siskel of the Chicago Tribune gave the movie one-and-a-half stars out of four and wrote, "'Americathon' is amusing in its first 20 minutes or so as it sets the stage for what's going on in 1998 ... But then it's 60 minutes of telethon, and frankly, even if you don't like Jerry Lewis, Korman's sendup wears awfully thin." Linda Gross of the Los Angeles Times wrote "The film has a clever premise, some funny sight gags and a few good one-liners, but the gag is too drawn out and watching the movie becomes like watching a TV variety show that goes on and on." Judith Martin of The Washington Post called the movie "a gross comedy that depends for jokes on President Carter's teeth, Governor Brown's psychoculture and other nationally recognized targets that anyone can hit blindfolded. Mostly, that film just whacks crudely away, although now and then it hits its mark with an impressive smack."

== Home media ==
The movie was made available on VHS and laserdisc in the 1980s by Lorimar Home Video, both of which are now out of print. The home video rights passed to Warner Bros. in the late 1980s as part of their purchase of Lorimar. Warner Home Video made the movie available in January 2011 on DVD in widescreen (1.85:1) format as part of its Warner Archive manufacture-on-demand collection.

== Legacy ==
In 1984, New York City public radio station WNYC sponsored a marathon of American music dubbed "Americathon '84".

== Predictions ==
Referencing the movie's futuristic premise itself, there were many societal or political forecasts woven into the storyline, and a number of these have become reality since the film's release, including:

- The People's Republic of China embraces capitalism and becomes a global economic superpower.
- Nike becomes a huge multinational conglomerate.
- The collapse of the USSR occurs.
- The prevalence of reality shows on television.
- Network television deals with previously taboo subjects accepted as normal (Monty Rushmore stars in the sitcom Both Father and Mother and plays a cross-dressing single father in the title role. The film's narrative also mentions The Schlong Show, a game show where contestants are judged by their reproductive organs).
- A governor of California is elected president.
- People in the 21st century began living increasingly in vans and RVs to offset the cost of unaffordable housing and property taxes.
