= Sumahama =

Single by the Beach Boys

from the album L.A. (Light Album)
- A-side: "It's a Beautiful Day"
- Released: September 1979
- Genre: Pop
- Length: 4:07 (album); 4:28 (single)
- Label: Caribou
- Songwriter(s): Mike Love
- Producer(s): Bruce Johnston, The Beach Boys, James William Guercio

The Beach Boys singles chronology
"Lady Lynda" (1979)	"Sumahama" (1979)	"Goin' On" (1980)

"Sumahama" is a song by American rock band the Beach Boys from their 1979 album L.A. (Light Album). Written by Mike Love, it was lyrically inspired by his fiancée at the time, a woman named Sumako. The lyrics describe "a young girl who wants to go with her mother to a place called 'Sumahama' in search of her father." Although some of the lyrics are in Japanese, Sumako was of Korean descent.

Sumahama is also the name of a popular beach in Kobe, Japan. 'Hama' is the Japanese word for 'beach'.

== Background ==
It was originally written by Mike Love for his unreleased solo album, First Love. When the release of that project fell through, the song was rerecorded by the Beach Boys.

The original United States LP release of the L.A. (Light Album) featured a version of "Sumahama" that faded out early during the final Japanese verse and did not feature the instrumental ending present on the later released 45 or the re-released CD version of the album. The original LP version of the song was approximately four minutes and seven seconds.

== Single release ==
In the U.S., "Sumahama" was released as a B-side to the single "It's a Beautiful Day".

"Sumahama" was released as a single in the UK backed with "Angel Come Home", charting at number 45.

== Personnel ==
Per Craig Slowinski.

The Beach Boys

- Mike Love – lead vocals
- Carl Wilson - backing vocals
- Bruce Johnston - backing vocals

Additional musicians

- Murray Adler - violin
- Roberleigh Barnhart - cello
- Myer Bello - viola
- Alfred Breuning - violin
- Isabelle Daskoff - violin
- Earle Dumler - oboe
- Jesse Ehrlich - cello
- Bryan Garofalo - bass guitar
- Igor Horoshevsky - cello
- Bill House - guitar
- Bernard Kundell - violin
- William Kurasch - violin
- Gayle Levant - harp
- Joy Lyle - violin
- Brian O’Connor - French horn
- Earl Palmer - drums
- Joel Peskin - flute
- Jay Rosen - violin
- Sid Sharp - violin
- Barbara Thomason - cello
- Tommy Vig - vibraphone
- Jai Winding - Fender Rhodes
- Herschel Wise - viola
- Tibor Zelig - violin
