= Here Comes the Night (The Beach Boys song) =

Song by American group Beach Boys

Song by the Beach Boys

from the album Wild Honey
- Released: December 18, 1967
- Recorded: October 1967
- Studio: Beach Boys Studio
- Genre: Blue-eyed soul; pop
- Length: 2:41
- Label: Capitol
- Songwriters: Brian Wilson; Mike Love
- Producer: The Beach Boys

Licensed audio
- "Here Comes the Night" on YouTube

"Here Comes the Night" is a song by the American rock band the Beach Boys from their 1967 album Wild Honey. Written by Brian Wilson and Mike Love, the group later rerecorded the track for their 1979 album, L.A. (Light Album), as a disco song lasting nearly eleven minutes. A four-minute edit of this version was released as a single on February 19, 1979, and reached number 44 on the U.S. Billboard Hot 100.

== Composition ==
Author Andrew Hickey noted: "This is a rather by-the-numbers song which however manages the interesting trick of having the chorus apparently lose its tonal centre altogether – normally one would have a harmonically simple chorus while the verses are complex, but this has simple verses in C but a chorus whose chords are Cmin, Ab7 and F, which are chords that just should not go together."

== Original recording ==
"Here Comes the Night" was logged as having been recorded at Beach Boys Studio on October 26, 1967, although in actuality it's more likely to have been throughout the end of the month.

== Disco remake ==
"Here Comes the Night"

Single by the Beach Boys

from the album L.A. (Light Album)
- B-side: "Baby Blue"
- Released: February 19, 1979
- Genre: Disco
- Length: 4:28
- Label: Brother; Caribou; CBS
- Songwriters: Brian Wilson; Mike Love
- Producers: Bruce Johnston; Curt Becher

The Beach Boys singles chronology
"Peggy Sue" (1978)	"Here Comes the Night" (1979)	"Good Timin'" (1979)

Licensed audio
- "Here Comes the Night" on YouTube

The 1979 disco version of the song, produced by Bruce Johnston and Curt Becher, is over eight minutes longer than the original song, with Becher contributing to the arrangement.

Dennis Wilson was opposed to this recording, and Brian did not participate. Al Jardine later expressed his distaste for the disco remake of the song.

I hated that track. It was one of the worst experiences of my life recording anywhere, but Bruce has this idea to do the perfect disco record, which of course none of our fans wanted us to do. I like the original song, but this pandering to disco did not work. Curt Becher, who was really quite a producer and musician in his own right, it was really a labor of love for those guys. They wanted every note perfect, and it had to be right on the right beats per minute, mathematically created for disco. But that disco sound didn't suit the Beach Boys at all.

There are five edits of this disco version. The first edit appears on the L.A. (Light Album), while the second edit was released on a 12" single release (Caribou/Brother/CBS 2Z8-9028). The third edit was the B-side of the 12" single, which is a slightly shorter instrumental (backing track) version of the song. The fourth and fifth version of the song is found on the 7" single release (Caribou/Brother/CBS ZS8 9026)(DJ version).

Variations

- Time: 10 min 51 sec (album version)
- Time: 10 min 36 sec (12" single edit)
- Time: 9 min 4 sec (12" instrumental edit)
- Time: 4 min 28 sec (7" single edit) long version
- Time: 3 min 18 sec (7" single edit) short version

== Reception ==
Record producer Tony Visconti spoke positively of the song, commenting, "I can play that 10 times today and I wouldn't get bored with it."

The "Here Comes the Night" disco single (backed with "Baby Blue") was issued on February 19, 1979, and peaked at number 44. The band briefly introduced the disco version into their live set in 1979. Jardine commented, "We performed it once and we were booed. We actually received such criticism that we never played it again."

Reviewing the single in 1979, Smash Hits said, "Hard, fast electro-burble and swirling strings pound along beneath snatches of harmonising voices and a lot of solo lead singing of an unremarkable song. It's OK but there are plenty of better disco tracks about." Record World said that the song "is lush and perfectly adapted to the genre."

== Personnel ==
Per John Brode, Will Crerar, Joshilyn Hoisington, and Craig Slowinski.

=== 1967 version ===
The Beach Boys

- Al Jardine – backing vocals, 12-string electric guitar
- Mike Love – backing vocals
- Brian Wilson – lead and backing vocals, grand piano, Baldwin organ, snare drum
- Carl Wilson – backing vocals, 12-string electric guitar, bass guitar, tambourine

=== 1979 version ===
The Beach Boys

- Carl Wilson – lead vocals
- Mike Love – backing vocals
- Al Jardine – backing vocals
- Bruce Johnston – backing vocals

Additional personnel

- Murray Adler – violin
- Mike Baird – drums, percussion
- Myer Bello – viola
- Curt Boettcher – guitars
- Joe Chemay – bass guitar
- Marcia Van Dyke – violin
- Jesse Ehrlich – cello
- Gene Estes – clavinet, vibraphone
- Bob Esty – synthesizer, percussion
- Victor Feldman – percussion
- Henry Ferber – violin
- Ronald Folsom – violin
- James Getzoff – violin
- Allan Harshman – viola
- Raymond Kelley – cello
- William Kurasch – violin
- Marvin Limonick – violin
- Joy Lyle – violin
- Mike Meros – clavinet, Wurlitzer electric piano
- David Montagu – violin
- Ira Newborn – guitars
- Michael Nowak – viola
- Judy Perett – cello
- Joel Peskin – alto saxophone
- Nathan Ross – violin
- David Schwartz – viola
- Sid Sharp – violin
- Harry Shlutz – cello
- Linn Subotnick – viola
- Wah Wah Watson – lead guitar
- Herschel Wise – viola
- Dan Wyman – synthesizer programming
- Tibor Zelig – violin
- Richie Zito – lead guitar

== Charts ==
Chart (1979)	Peak position
UK Singles (The Official Charts Company)	37
US Billboard Hot 100	44
US Billboard Disco Top 80	48
