= Lady Lynda =

Single by the Beach Boys

from the album L.A. (Light Album)
- B-side: "Full Sail"
- Released: June 1979
- Recorded: July–November 1978
- Genre: Pop; symphonic rock
- Length: 3:58
- Label: Brother/Caribou/CBS
- Songwriters: Al Jardine; Ron Altbach
- Producers: Bruce Johnston; The Beach Boys; James William Guercio

The Beach Boys singles chronology
"Good Timin'" (1979)	"Lady Lynda" (1979)	"It's a Beautiful Day" (1979)

"Lady Lynda" is a song written by vocalist/guitarist Al Jardine and touring keyboardist Ron Altbach for American rock band the Beach Boys. It was released on the band's 1979 album L.A. (Light Album). Its melody is based on "Jesu, Joy of Man's Desiring" by J. S. Bach.

The opening harpsichord is played by Sterling Smith. The lyrics to the song refer to Jardine's then-wife, Lynda Jardine. After the two divorced, the song was rewritten as "Lady Liberty", a tribute to the Statue of Liberty. It was released as the B-side to the group's 1986 single of "California Dreamin'".

Record World said it has "a big production sound and liberal synthesizer/string textures."

The song peaked at No. 6 on the UK Singles Chart. It also reached No. 39 on the U.S. adult contemporary chart. The song was edited for single release with the single version dropping the harpsichord introduction present on the album version.

== Personnel ==
Credits from Craig Slowinski

=== Lady Lynda ===
The Beach Boys

- Al Jardine – lead and backing vocals, 12-string guitar
- Bruce Johnston - backing vocals; possible Fender Rhodes
- Mike Love - backing vocals
- Brian Wilson - possible backing vocals
- Carl Wilson - backing vocals
- Dennis Wilson – co-arrangement

Additional musicians

- Murray Adler - violin
- Arnold Belnick - violin
- Samuel Boghossian - viola
- Jimmy Bond - double bass
- Verlye Mills Brilhart - harp
- Ed Carter - guitar, bass guitar
- Isabelle Daskoff - violin
- Jim Decker - French horn
- Harold Dicterow - violin
- Jesse Ehrlich - cello
- Henry Ferber - violin
- Bobby Figueroa – drums, tambourine, tubular bells
- Richard Folsom - violin
- James Getzoff - violin
- Harris Goldman - violin
- Dick Hyde - trombones and bass trombone
- Raymond Kelley - cello
- Jerome Kessler - cello
- William Kurasch - violin
- Marvin Limonick - violin
- Charles Loper - French horn
- Arthur Maebe - French horn
- Jay Migliori - flutes
- Ray Pizzi - bassoons
- Jack Redmond - French horn
- William Reichenbach - French horn
- Lyle Ritz - double bass
- Jay Rosen - violin
- David Schwartz - viola
- Bobby Shew - trumpets
- Harry Shlutz - cello
- Sterling Smith - harpsichord; possible Fender Rhodes
- Linn Subotnick - viola
- Herschel Wise - viola
- Tibor Zelig - violin

=== Full Sail ===
The Beach Boys

- Bruce Johnston - backing vocals
- Mike Love - backing vocals
- Carl Wilson - lead and backing vocals, Fender Rhodes

Additional musicians

- Murray Adler - violin
- Arnold Belnick - violin
- Samuel Boghossian - viola
- Jimmy Bond - double bass
- Verlye Mills Brilhart - harp
- Geoffrey Cushing-Murray - backing vocals
- Isabelle Daskoff - violin
- Jim Decker - French horn
- Harold Dicterow - violin
- Jesse Ehrlich - cello
- Henry Ferber - violin
- Bobby Figueroa – backing vocals
- Richard Folsom - violin
- Steve Forman - percussion
- James Getzoff - violin
- Harris Goldman - violin
- Jim Guercio - bass guitar
- Raymond Kelley - cello
- Jerome Kessler - cello
- William Kurasch - violin
- Marvin Limonick - violin
- Charles Loper - French horn
- Arthur Maebe - French horn
- Gary Mallaber - drums, timpani
- Jack Redmond - French horn
- William Reichenbach - French horn
- Lyle Ritz - double bass
- Jay Rosen - violin
- David Schwartz - viola
- Harry Shlutz - cello
- Linn Subotnick - viola
- Herschel Wise - viola
- Tibor Zelig - violin
