= Soulful Old Man Sunshine =

Song by the Beach Boys

from the album Endless Harmony Soundtrack
- Released: August 11, 1998
- Recorded: November 6–9, 1969
- Length: 3:25
- Songwriters: Brian Wilson, Rick Henn, Don Ralke

Licensed audio
- "Soulful Old Man Sunshine" on YouTube

"Soulful Old Man Sunshine" is a song by the American rock band the Beach Boys that was recorded during the sessions for their 1970 album Sunflower. It was written by Brian Wilson, Rick Henn (former leader of the Murry Wilson-spearheaded Sunrays) and veteran arranger/producer Don Ralke (who previously contributed to The Many Moods of Murry Wilson [1967]).

== Production ==
"Soulful Old Man Sunshine" was recorded on November 6 and 9, 1969, but was left unfinished. Henn arranged the instrumentation, while Brian wrote the vocal arrangement, which was loosely based on the 1957 hit "Little Bitty Pretty One".

Carl Wilson sang the lead vocal, at one point mispronouncing the title line as "soulful old man shunshine". According to biographers Andrew Doe and John Tobler, the track would have been included on the 1993 box set Good Vibrations, but Carl had vetoed it because he had been embarrassed by his tongue twist on the recording.

== Release ==
"Soulful Old Man Sunshine" was released on the 1998 compilation Endless Harmony Soundtrack. The set also included a demo recording featuring Brian Wilson singing and Henn playing piano.

Don Ralke remained uncredited as a co-writer by the song's publishers on Endless Harmony Soundtrack and the subsequent Made in California box set (2013) until a 2019 mix (notable for its elision of Carl's mispronunciation) was included on Feel Flows: The Sunflower & Surf's Up Sessions 1969–1971 (2021).

== Cover version ==
- 1992 – Manfred Schmidt, In My Room

== See also ==
- List of unreleased songs recorded by the Beach Boys
