= Brian's Back (song) =

Song by the Beach Boys

from the album Endless Harmony Soundtrack
- Released: August 11, 1998
- Recorded: August 28–31, 1978 (unreleased Beach Boys Light Album version); October-November 1978 (First Love solo version)
- Length: 4:07
- Label: Capitol
- Songwriter(s): Mike Love
- Producer(s): Paul Fauerso

Licensed audio
- "Brian's Back" on YouTube

"Brian's Back" is a song by American rock band the Beach Boys that was recorded in two versions during the sessions for Love's unreleased solo album First Love and the Beach Boys' 1979 album L.A. (Light Album). Written by Mike Love and produced by Paul Fauerso, the song addresses the "Brian Is Back!" media campaign from 1976. The players on the First Love version included Carl Wilson, Ron Altbach, Dave Somerville, and Jerry Donahue. Following Brian Wilson's passing, Mike Love shared a tribute film by filmmaker Noven Jaisi—featuring the song—on his social media and at his live shows.

== Background and lyrics ==
Mike Love wrote the song as a response to the "Brian Is Back!" publicity campaign that had surrounded Brian Wilson and the release of the group's 1976 album 15 Big Ones. Love wrote in his memoir,

Brian wasn't back. [...] But there was a time, early in the campaign, that I hoped Brian really was back, and there were times in the studio or even onstage when Brian would reconnect to the music and his voice would soar and he would hit the high notes as only Brian Wilson could. I would watch in amazement and get so emotional I'd have to choke back the tears. I couldn't tell him how I felt, but I wrote this song instead, called "Brian's Back."

Besides his work with the Beach Boys and his side band Celebration, Love also recorded two solo albums in October and November 1978. First Love was produced by Love's Celebration collaborator Paul Fauerso and featured original songs by Love and vocals from cousin and Beach Boys bandmate Carl Wilson. Country Love was a country album produced by Al Perkins (a pedal steel guitarist formerly of The Flying Burrito Brothers and Manassas) and mostly featured original songs written by Love. Both albums were not released but were later bootlegged; Love later revisited and re-recorded several songs from First Love later in his solo career and with The Beach Boys.

Two versions of "Brian's Back" were recorded: a solo version (with a guest appearance from Carl) intended for First Love and a Beach Boys version, intended for their 1979 album L.A. (Light Album).

The lyrics contain references to "Fun, Fun, Fun", "I Get Around", "Good Vibrations", and Pet Sounds.

== Personnel ==
Partial credits for Mike Love's solo version intended for the unreleased album First Love.

- Mike Love - lead vocals
- Carl Wilson - co-lead and additional vocals
- Paul Fauerso - vocals, producer
- Ron Altbach - vocals
- Dave Somerville - vocals
- Jerry Donahue - guitar

== Release ==
"Brian's Back" was considered for inclusion on a Mike Love solo album, First Love, which was never released. Instead, the track was first released on the 1998 compilation Endless Harmony Soundtrack. In 2013, an alternate mix was included on the box set Made in California. The Beach Boys' version remains unreleased.

== See also ==
- List of unreleased songs recorded by the Beach Boys
