= Loop de Loop (Flip Flop Flyin' in an Aeroplane) =

Song by the Beach Boys

from the album Endless Harmony Soundtrack
- Released: August 11, 1998
- Recorded: March 5, 1969 – July 4, 1998
- Studio: Sunset Sound, Beach Boys, and The Red Barn
- Label: Capitol
- Songwriters: Al Jardine, Brian Wilson, Carl Wilson
- Producer: Al Jardine

Licensed audio
- "Loop de Loop (Flip Flop Flyin' in an Aeroplane)" on YouTube

"Loop de Loop (Flip Flop Flyin' in an Aeroplane)" is a song by the American rock band the Beach Boys that was written by Al Jardine, Brian Wilson, and Carl Wilson. It was originally recorded between the late 1960s and 1970s. In 1998, Jardine finished the song for its release on Endless Harmony Soundtrack.

== "Sail Plane Song" ==
"Loop de Loop" was originally written by Brian and Carl Wilson under the titles "Sail Plane Song" (written on the tape box) and "Glide Plane Song" (written on the tape leader). The group recorded a version at their private studio on June 8, 1968 during the early sessions for their album 20/20. Relative to later versions, the instrumentation was bare, featuring only drums, bass, guitar, organ, and piano played by the band members. According to biographer Peter Ames Carlin,

That Brian is growing increasingly interested in numbing his senses becomes all the more clear. ... Here, Brian leaps onto a metaphorical airplane that; given the oddly circular chord pattern ... and the remote sound of his vocal, is fueled by something more psychedelic than diesel jet fuel. ... nearly explaining why a person in pain might feel inclined to get high via any available means. And indeed, the joruney [sic?] he goes on to relate is both vividly described and entirely disconnected from reality, from his visit to the ocean to the skyward climb that ends when he turns off the engine and, instead of falling through the clouds, sails straight to the sun.

== Reworkings ==
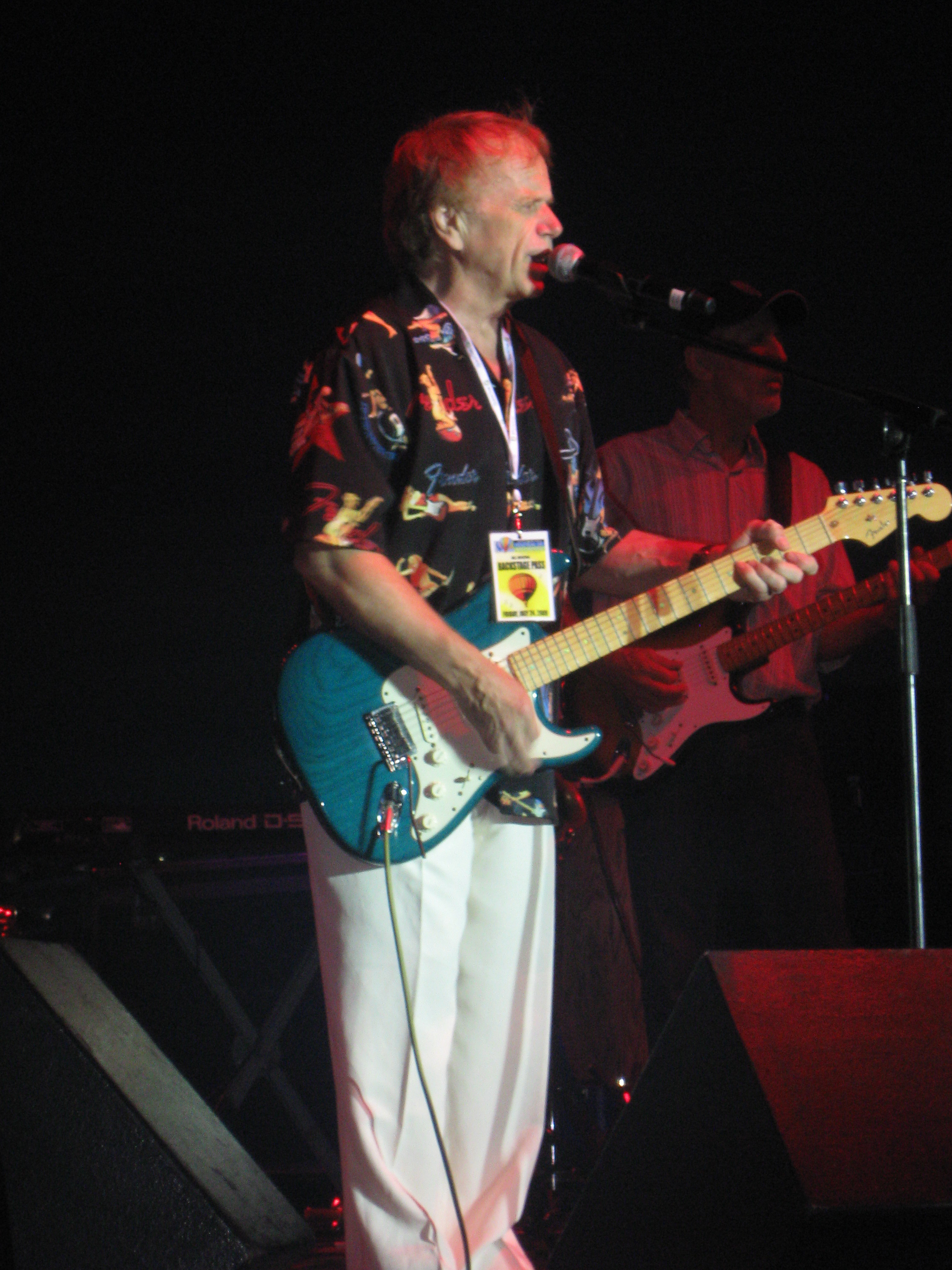
It took Al Jardine 29 years to finish the song.

Following the recording of "Sail Plane Song", Al Jardine reworked the arrangement and rerecorded the song from scratch at Sunset Sound Recorders on March 5 and 6, 1969. Further recording was made at the band's studio at a later date. On his contribution to the song, now titled "Loop De Loop," Jardine commented,

I see myself as a kind of completer of things. "Loop De Loop" was Brian's idea to begin with. I fully admit that the genesis idea came from his brain, but he refused to finish it. He would just leave it there dangling in front of you and you'd go, "For God's sake, this is too good to leave unfinished."

His additions to the instrumentation included timpani, cymbals, string bass, tack piano, Fender Rhodes, several guitars (including one processed through a Leslie speaker), ukulele, tambourine, glockenspiel, horns, woodwinds, Moog synthesizer, and other sound effects. Capitol A&R director Karl Engemann drafted a memo, dated May 16, 1969, that mentioned that he was enthused about "Loop de Loop (Flip Flop)" [sic] being the band's next single.

After the release of Sunflower, band engineer Stephen Desper assembled a collection of songs consisting mostly of outtakes deemed suitable for a follow-up LP, which he labelled "Second Brother Album". The selections included "Loop de Loop". Band manager Jack Rieley rejected the selections, describing "Loop de Loop" as "forgettable". He later stated that his growing involvement with the group's songwriting process had attracted the ire of Jardine, Mike Love, and Bruce Johnston, who "tried to force me to march into Mo Ostin's and sell him on their 1969 track 'Loop De Loop'. I refused and Brian, Dennis, and Carl backed me up."

According to music historian Brad Elliot, the track was left unreleased due to Jardine's dissatisfaction with his lead vocal. In late 1977, the song was rewritten as "Santa's Got an Airplane" for the band's unreleased album Merry Christmas from the Beach Boys. This version used the same backing track as "Loop de Loop", but different vocals to reflect the new Christmas-themed lyrics. The writing was credited to Jardine, Brian, and Love.

In July 1998, Jardine returned to the song once more, rerecording his vocals at The Red Barn studio in Big Sur.

== Release history ==
- In August 1998, the original "Sail Plane Song" recording and Jardine's newly-remixed version of "Loop de Loop" were released for the compilation Endless Harmony Soundtrack.
- In September 1998, "Santa's Got an Airplane" was released for the compilation Ultimate Christmas.
- In 2013, an alternate mix of "Sail Plane Song" was released for the compilation Made in California.
- In 2018, an alternate mix of "Sail Plane Song" was released for the compilation I Can Hear Music: The 20/20 Sessions.
- In 2021, the 1969 mix of "Loop de Loop" was released for the compilation Feel Flows.

== Personnel ==
Per Brad Elliot.

"Sail Plane Song"

- Al Jardine – guitar
- Bruce Johnston – organ
- Brian Wilson – piano
- Carl Wilson – bass
- unknown – drums (likely Dennis Wilson)
