= Ultimate Christmas (The Beach Boys album) =

Compilation album by the Beach Boys
- Released: September 22, 1998
- Recorded: October 1963 – November 1977
- Genre: Rock
- Length: 61:58
- Label: Capitol
- Producer: Brad Elliot

The Beach Boys chronology
| Endless Harmony Soundtrack (1998) | Ultimate Christmas (1998) | The Capitol Years (1999) |

Professional ratings
Review scores
| Source | Rating |
|---|---|
| AllMusic | 4/5 stars |
| Blender | 2/5 stars |
| Encyclopedia of Popular Music | 2/5 stars |

Ultimate Christmas is a 1998 compilation of Christmas music by the Beach Boys released on Capitol Records. It rounds up all of the tracks from 1964's The Beach Boys' Christmas Album in addition to a handful of unreleased tracks from the aborted Merry Christmas from the Beach Boys album in 1977, some of which are alternative versions of songs included on M.I.U. Album the following year.

As a collection of the Beach Boys' Christmas tunes, Ultimate Christmas manages to round up virtually every song the band recorded and released on the subject. In 2004, Capitol took it out of print and replaced it with Christmas with the Beach Boys, essentially the same compilation with different cover art and one song ("Christmas Time Is Here Again") removed from the track list. Tracks 14-15 and 17-26 were previously unreleased.

== Track listing ==
| No. | Title | Writer(s) | Lead vocals | Length |
|---|---|---|---|---|
| 1. | "Little Saint Nick" | Brian Wilson, Mike Love | Mike Love | 2:01 |
| 2. | "The Man with All the Toys" | B. Wilson, Love | Brian Wilson and Love | 1:32 |
| 3. | "Santa's Beard" | B. Wilson, Love | Love | 2:00 |
| 4. | "Merry Christmas, Baby" | B. Wilson | Love | 2:21 |
| 5. | "Christmas Day" | B. Wilson | Al Jardine | 1:47 |
| 6. | "Frosty the Snowman" | Steve Nelson, Jack Rollins | B. Wilson | 1:54 |
| 7. | "We Three Kings of Orient Are" | John Henry Hopkins | Love and B. Wilson | 4:03 |
| 8. | "Blue Christmas" | Billy Hayes, Jay W. Johnson | B. Wilson | 3:09 |
| 9. | "Santa Claus Is Coming to Town" | J. Fred Coots, Haven Gillespie | B. Wilson and Love | 2:20 |
| 10. | "White Christmas" | Irving Berlin | B. Wilson | 2:29 |
| 11. | "I'll Be Home for Christmas" | Kim Gannon, Walter Kent, Buck Ram | B. Wilson | 2:44 |
| 12. | "Auld Lang Syne" | Traditional; arranged by B. Wilson | group | 1:19 |
| 13. | "Little Saint Nick" (Single Version, Stereo) | B. Wilson, Love | Love | 2:08 |
| 14. | "Auld Lang Syne" (Alternate Mix) | Traditional; arranged by B. Wilson | group | 1:23 |
| 15. | "Little Saint Nick" (Alternate Version) | B. Wilson, Love | B. Wilson and Love | 2:04 |
| 16. | "Child of Winter (Christmas Song)" | B. Wilson, Stephen Kalinich | B. Wilson and Love | 2:49 |
| 17. | "Santa's Got an Airplane" | Alan Jardine, B. Wilson, Love | Love and Al Jardine | 3:09 |
| 18. | "Christmas Time Is Here Again" | Buddy Holly, Norman Petty, Jerry Allison, Jardine | Jardine | 3:02 |
| 19. | "Winter Symphony" | B. Wilson | B. Wilson | 3:00 |
| 20. | "(I Saw Santa) Rockin' Around the Christmas Tree" | B. Wilson, Jardine | Al, Matt and Adam Jardine | 2:23 |
| 21. | "Melekalikimaka" (aka "Kona Christmas") | Jardine, Love | Love and Jardine | 2:34 |
| 22. | "Bells of Christmas" | Jardine, Ron Altbach, Love | Jardine | 2:44 |
| 23. | "Morning Christmas" | Dennis Wilson | Dennis Wilson | 3:22 |
| 24. | "Toy Drive Public Service Announcement" | | | 1:23 |
| 25. | "Dennis Wilson Christmas Message" | | | 0:31 |
| 26. | "Brian Wilson Christmas Interview" | | | 2:35 |
