= It's a Beautiful Day (The Beach Boys song) =

Single by The Beach Boys
- B-side: "Sumahama"
- Released: September 1979
- Recorded: Unknown
- Genre: Pop
- Length: 4 min 36 sec (Americathon version); 3 min 20 sec (single mix); 3 min 29 sec (Made in California remix)
- Label: Caribou Records
- Songwriters: Mike Love and Al Jardine
- Producer: Bruce Johnston

The Beach Boys singles chronology
"Lady Lynda" (1979)	"It's a Beautiful Day" (1979)	"Goin' On" (1980)

"It's a Beautiful Day" is a song written by Mike Love and Al Jardine for the American rock band The Beach Boys. The song was never released on an original Beach Boys album; however, it was released on the soundtrack to the film Americathon and as a single in September 1979 with B-side, "Sumahama". The song has also been released on the Ten Years of Harmony Beach Boys compilation album as well as the Made in California compilation.

Record World said that it "captures all the exuberance of a sunny day on a California beach."

On October 11, 2026, the song was given its live debut by Jardine, performing it with his backing Pet Sounds Band in Cerritos, California at the Cerritos Center for the Performing Arts; Jardine provided lead vocals on the live performance as well.

== Personnel ==
Credits via Craig Slowinski.

The Beach Boys

- Brian Wilson – possible organ
- Mike Love – vocals
- Al Jardine – vocals, rhythm guitar
- Carl Wilson – vocals, lead guitar
- Bruce Johnston – backing vocals, piano

Kim Calkins – drums

Kevin "Brandino" Brandon – bass

Jeff Peters – engineer, mixer
