= Lost & Found (1961–62) =

Compilation album by The Beach Boys
- Released: February 1991
- Recorded: September 15, 1961 – March 8, 1962
- Genre: Rock
- Length: 37:48
- Label: DCC Compact Classics
- Producer: Hite Morgan

The Beach Boys chronology
Still Cruisin' (1989)	Lost & Found (1961–62) (1991)	Summer in Paradise (1992)

Professional ratings
Review scores
Source	Rating
AllMusic	3.5/5 stars
MusicHound	3.5/5

Lost & Found (1961–62) is a Beach Boys compilation album which was released in 1991 under DCC Compact Classics record company. The album contains all of the early recordings of the band before they were signed to their first major record label, Capitol Records. This release is notable to collectors as it uses the original master tapes, whereas many countless gray market issues of the same material use inferior sources. This release was compiled and mastered by Steve Hoffman. Original recordings were produced by Hite Morgan in 1961 & 1962.

== Track listing ==
1. "Luau" demo (Bruce Morgan) – 1:46
2. "Surfin'" demo (Brian Wilson, Mike Love) – 2:31
3. "Studio Chatter" – 0:16
4. "Surfin'" (Brian Wilson, Mike Love) – 2:29
5. "Studio Chatter" – 0:07
6. "Surfin'" (Brian Wilson, Mike Love) – 2:21
7. "Studio Chatter" – 0:23
8. "Luau" (Bruce Morgan) – 1:50
9. "Luau" (Bruce Morgan) – 1:49
10. "Barbie" (Bruce Morgan) – 2:23 [†]
11. "What Is a Young Girl Made Of" (Bruce Morgan) – 2:18 [†]
12. "Surfin' Safari" (Brian Wilson, Mike Love) – 2:06
13. "Studio Chatter" – 0:20
14. "Surfin' Safari" (Brian Wilson, Mike Love) – 2:05
15. "Studio Chatter" – 1:00
16. "Surfer Girl" (Brian Wilson) – 2:26
17. "Judy" (Brian Wilson) – 2:22
18. "Judy" (Brian Wilson) – 2:21
19. "Beach Boy Stomp (A.K.A. Karate)" (Carl Wilson) – 2:15
20. "Surfin' Safari" (Stereo overdub attempt) (Brian Wilson, Mike Love) – 2:09
21. "Lavender" demo (Bruce Morgan) – 2:31

[†]: These tracks were released under the name Kenny and The Cadets, which comprised Brian, Carl, and Audree Wilson, and Al Jardine (after he'd left The Beach Boys). These appear as stereo mixes with the vocals on one channel, the instrumental track on the other. The originally released single was mono.
