= Beach Boii =

American rapper

- Born: Christian Andre Beach; New York City, New York
- Origin: West Palm Beach, Florida
- Genres: Hip Hop, Pop, R&B
- Occupations: Rapper; singer; songwriter; producer
- Instrument: Vocals
- Years active: 2016–present
- Label: Beach Boii
- Website: beachboii.com

Christian Andre Beach, known professionally as Beach Boii, is an American rapper, singer, and songwriter from South Florida. He released his first EP, Bandit, in October 2018.

He is best known for his EP Work, released in 2019.

== Career ==
Christian Beach was born in New York City. He released his first single, "Fantasy", in 2016. In that same year he released the single "Come Closer". In 2017, Beach released several singles such as "Reach Me", "Shine", and "Rude". In 2018, he released his first EP called Bandit. In early 2019, Beach Boii's single "Rude" was listed as a No. 7 dance hall song by BuzzFeed. In late 2019, he gained local attention by the release of his EP Work. In early 2020, he gained media attention for the release of his single "2 Cold", which was later remixed with Vybz Kartel.

== Discography ==
=== Albums and EPs ===
List of albums & eps, with selected details
Title	Details
Bandit	Released: August 4, 2018; Label: Beach Boii LLC; Formats: Digital download
Work	Released: October 8, 2019; Label: Beach Boii LLC; Formats: Digital download

== Singles ==
List of singles, showing year released and album name
Title	Year	Album
"Fantasy"	2016	Non-album single
"Come Closer"	2016	Non-album single
"Reach Me"	2017	Non-album single
"Shine"	2017	Non-album single
"Rude"	2017	Non-album single
"No Games"	2017	Non-album single
"Real Gyalis"	2018	Non-album single
"Wave"	2018	Non-album single
"Vibe"	2019	Non-album single
"Ariana feat. Choliare"	2019	Non-album single
"Luv Problems"	2019	Non-album single
"Hold On"	2019	Non-album single
"2 Cold"	2020	Non-album single
