= Good Timin' (The Beach Boys song) =

Single by the Beach Boys

from the album L.A. (Light Album)
- B-side: "Love Surrounds Me"
- Released: April 1979
- Recorded: April 29 / November 2, 1974; December 13, 1978
- Studio: Brother Studios and Caribou Ranch, California
- Genre: Pop
- Length: 2:12
- Label: Brother/Caribou/CBS
- Songwriter(s): Brian Wilson; Carl Wilson
- Producer(s): Bruce Johnston; The Beach Boys; James William Guercio

The Beach Boys singles chronology
"Here Comes the Night" (1979)	"Good Timin'" (1979)	"Lady Lynda" (1979)

"Good Timin'" is a song by the American rock band the Beach Boys and the second single from their 1979 album L.A. (Light Album). It is one of the few songs jointly credited to Brian and Carl Wilson.

== Recording ==
"Good Timin'" was recorded during the group's sessions at Brother Studios and Caribou Ranch in April and November 1974, respectively, with Brian contributing piano and harpsichord. The basic track was completed and Carl Wilson recorded the lead vocals. In a 1975 interview, Carl stated that the track had been slated for the group's next album. That album, which became 15 Big Ones, ultimately did not include "Good Timin'". In a 1976 interview, Dennis Wilson bemoaned the track's absence from 15 Big Ones, praising it as "another 'Surfer Girl'".

Due to negative critical reactions to the Beach Boys' "Here Comes the Night" disco single, "Good Timin'" was hastily assembled with necessary vocal overdubs by Carl and Bruce Johnston and released as a single. Johnston recalled: "I'm not putting Al down or Mike but the real soldier who stuck with me the whole time was Carl. The two of us sang the verses on Good Timin', the two of us sang the four vocal parts."

== Release ==
"Good Timin'" reached No. 40 in the U.S. during a stay of ten weeks on the Billboard Hot 100 singles chart; and peaked at No. 33 on the Cash Box sales chart. It was their first single to reach the Top 40 portion of the chart since "It's OK" in October 1976. It also reached No. 12 on the Billboard Adult Contemporary chart.

Record World called it a "vintage Beach Boys ballad complete with rich layers of their trademark falsetto harmonies."

== Live performances ==
"Good Timin'" was performed live on tours throughout the early 1980s following its release. Brian sang the lead vocals during The 50th Reunion Tour with Al Jardine also on vocals filling in for Carl Wilson.

== Personnel ==
Sourced from sessionography archivist Craig Slowinski.

=== Good Timin' ===
The Beach Boys

- Carl Wilson – lead and backing vocals, guitars
- Brian Wilson – piano, harpsichord, organ
- Dennis Wilson – drums
- Bruce Johnston – backing vocals, Fender Rhodes electric piano
- Mike Love – backing vocals
- Al Jardine – backing vocals

Additional musician

- Jim Guercio – bass

=== Love Surrounds Me ===
The Beach Boys

- Dennis Wilson – lead, harmony and backing vocals, Fender Rhodes, Oberheim and Moog synthesizers, additional drums, timpani, arrangements
- Carl Wilson – backing vocals
- Bruce Johnston - backing vocals

Additional musicians

- Christine McVie – backing vocals
- Ed Carter – electric lead and rhythm guitars
- Neil LeVang – dobro during closing vamp
- Joe Chemay – bass
- Carli Muñoz – grand piano
- Phil Shenale – Oberheim synthesizer during closing vamp
- Bobby Figueroa – drums
- Steve Forman – tambourine, mark tree, bell tree, cabasa during closing vamp
