= Endless Harmony Soundtrack =

Compilation album by The Beach Boys
- Released: 11 August 1998
- Recorded: 12 June 1963 – 4 July 1998
- Genre: Rock
- Length: 74:01
- Label: Capitol
- Producers: Phil Sandhaus, Michel Etchart

The Beach Boys chronology
The Pet Sounds Sessions (1997)	Endless Harmony Soundtrack (1998)	Ultimate Christmas (1998)

Alternate cover
- The cover for the re-released version, issued on 28 March 2000.

Professional ratings
Review scores
Source	Rating
AllMusic	4/5 stars
Encyclopedia of Popular Music	4/5 stars
The Rolling Stone Album Guide	2/5 stars
Melody Maker	4/5 stars

Endless Harmony Soundtrack is an anthology album of previously unheard material by The Beach Boys, originally released by Capitol Records in August 1998. Named for Bruce Johnston's song on the 1980 album Keepin' the Summer Alive, it was designed as a tie-in with the band's biographical documentary of the same name. The soundtrack was re-issued in March 2000 with some remixing and different artwork (European pressings retained the original mixes), while the original 1998 edition (with the orange/yellow cover) went out of print shortly thereafter.

== Background ==
The Endless Harmony project was undertaken shortly after the death of founding member Carl Wilson, who died of lung cancer in February 1998. At this point, Brian Wilson decided that the band was officially finished and disassociated himself from any further group activity. At odds with Mike Love for continuing after Carl's passing, Al Jardine did the same. Both Love and Bruce Johnston (with their accompanying concert act) continued to perform live as The Beach Boys until all five surviving members reunited for their 50th anniversary in 2012.

The Endless Harmony Soundtrack itself is patterned like The Beatles' Anthology albums, with alternate versions and live renditions of songs, as well as previously unreleased ones. Spanning from a stereo remix of 1963's "Surfer Girl" to the completion of the unreleased 1969 recording "Loop de Loop (Flip Flop Flyin' in an Aeroplane)", the album also includes a brief snippet of both Brian Wilson and Van Dyke Parks routining three Smile songs in 1966.

Endless Harmony Soundtrack never charted in the U.S. or the UK. Although the album was not a commercial success, it did encourage Capitol Records to issue a more comprehensive archival package in Hawthorne, CA, released in May 2001.

== Track listing ==
All tracks written by Brian Wilson and Mike Love, unless otherwise noted.

No.	Title	Length
1.	"Soulful Old Man Sunshine (Writing session excerpt)" (Brian Wilson, Rick Henn)	0:42
2.	"Soulful Old Man Sunshine " (B. Wilson, Henn)	3:25
3.	"Radio Concert Promo 1"	0:15
4.	"Medley: Surfin' Safari/Fun, Fun, Fun/Shut Down/Little Deuce Coupe/Surfin' U.S.A. (Live at University of Michigan 1966)" (B. Wilson, Mike Love, Roger Christian, Chuck Berry)	3:33
5.	"Surfer Girl (Binaural mix)" (B. Wilson)	2:27
6.	"Help Me, Rhonda (Alternate single version)"	2:50
7.	"Kiss Me, Baby (Stereo remix)"	2:42
8.	"California Girls (Stereo remix)"	2:44
9.	"Good Vibrations (Live rehearsal on 8 December 1968, London)"	3:40
10.	"Heroes and Villains ( 4 November 1966 demo)" (B. Wilson, Van Dyke Parks)	2:27
11.	"Heroes and Villains (Live outtake 1973)" (B. Wilson, Parks)	3:40
12.	"God Only Knows (Live at Wally Heider Studios 1967)" (B. Wilson, Tony Asher)	2:45
13.	"Radio Concert Promo 2"	0:15
14.	"Darlin' (Live at Knebworth 1980)"	2:26
15.	"Wonderful/Don't Worry Bill (Live at Carnegie Hall 1972)" (B. Wilson, Parks, Ricky Fataar, Blondie Chaplin, Steve Fataar, Brother Fataar)	5:52
16.	"Do It Again (Early version)"	2:30
17.	"Break Away (Demo)" (B. Wilson, Murry Wilson)	2:38
18.	"Sail Plane Song" (B. Wilson, Carl Wilson)	2:12
19.	"Loop de Loop (Flip Flop Flyin' in an Aeroplane)" (B. Wilson, C. Wilson, Al Jardine)	2:56
20.	"Barbara " (Dennis Wilson)	2:58
21.	"'Til I Die (Alternate mix)" (B. Wilson)	4:52
22.	"Long Promised Road (Live at Carnegie Hall 1972)" (C. Wilson, Jack Rieley)	4:17
23.	"All Alone" (Carli Muñoz)	3:36
24.	"Brian's Back" (Love)	4:07
25.	"Endless Harmony" (Bruce Johnston)	3:10

== Sources ==
- Endless Harmony Soundtrack CD booklet notes, Brad Elliott, c. 2000.
- Allmusic
