= Geoffrey Cushing-Murray =

American musician

Geoffrey Cushing-Murray (born 1946 in New York, United States) is an American songwriter. He served as a decorated Army officer in Vietnam and studied English at UCLA, where he was a member of the varsity fencing team. He has written songs such as "Hot Night in a Cold Town" which was covered by John Mellencamp, Uriah Heep and Steppenwolf. He was also a longtime songwriting partner of Carl Wilson of the Beach Boys, having co-written "Angel Come Home", "Full Sail", and "Goin' South" with Carl, and "Love Surrounds Me" with Dennis Wilson. Plans to write with Brian Wilson were shelved at the initial discussion stage. In the comments section of YouTube, Geoffrey Cushing-Murray states, "The correct lyric is "A Mexican wind blows in breaking the hold Angelinos have on their halos." Somewhere along the line someone mis-transcribed the lyric from a demo by John Kay to the "Angelina's hair" non sequitur. "
