= Fifty Big Ones =

Greatest hits album by the Beach Boys
- Released: October 9, 2012
- Recorded: 1962–2012
- Genre: Rock
- Length: 134:43
- Label: Capitol
- Producers: Brian Wilson, The Beach Boys, Nick Venet, Bruce Johnston, James William Guercio, Steve Levine, Terry Melcher

The Beach Boys chronology
That's Why God Made the Radio (2012)	Fifty Big Ones (2012)	Live – The 50th Anniversary Tour (2013)

Fifty Big Ones (also spelled 50 Big Ones) is a two-disc compilation album released by Capitol Records consisting of material from the American rock and roll band the Beach Boys. The album was released in 2012 to commemorate the band's 50th anniversary, and features some remastered mixes and stereo debuts. The track listing is similar to the setlist the band played on the 50th anniversary tour.

The name of the compilation is a reference to their 1976 album, 15 Big Ones, which included fifteen songs and commemorated their fifteenth anniversary (two songs from that album, "It's OK" and "Rock and Roll Music", are included here).

In Japan, the disc was released with a 51st track: the single version of "Be True to Your School".

== Track listing ==
All tracks written by Brian Wilson/Mike Love, unless otherwise noted.

=== Disc one ===
No.	Title	Writer(s)	Original album	Length
1.	"California Girls" (2002 stereo mix)		Summer Days (And Summer Nights!!)	2:46
2.	"Do It Again"		20/20	2:19
3.	"Surfin' Safari"		Surfin' Safari	2:06
4.	"Catch a Wave"		Surfer Girl	2:11
5.	"Little Honda"		All Summer Long	1:53
6.	"Surfin' U.S.A."	Chuck Berry, B. Wilson	Surfin' U.S.A.	2:30
7.	"Surfer Girl"	B. Wilson	Surfer Girl	2:27
8.	"Don't Worry Baby" (2009 stereo mix)		Shut Down Volume 2	2:50
9.	"Little Deuce Coupe"	B. Wilson, Roger Christian	Surfer Girl	1:41
10.	"Shut Down" (2003 stereo mix)	B. Wilson, Christian	Surfin' U.S.A.	1:51
11.	"I Get Around"		All Summer Long	2:13
12.	"The Warmth of the Sun"		Shut Down Volume 2	2:53
13.	"Please Let Me Wonder" (2007 stereo mix)		The Beach Boys Today!	2:51
14.	"Wendy" (2007 stereo mix)		All Summer Long	2:21
15.	"Getcha Back"	Mike Love, Terry Melcher	The Beach Boys	3:01
16.	"The Little Girl I Once Knew"		non-LP single, 1965	2:36
17.	"When I Grow Up (To Be a Man)" (2012 stereo mix)		The Beach Boys Today!	2:05
18.	"It's O.K."		15 Big Ones	2:12
19.	"Dance, Dance, Dance" (2003 stereo mix)	B. Wilson, Love, Carl Wilson	The Beach Boys Today!	2:04
20.	"Do You Wanna Dance?" (2012 stereo mix)	Bobby Freeman	The Beach Boys Today!	2:22
21.	"Rock and Roll Music"	Chuck Berry	15 Big Ones	2:28
22.	"Barbara Ann" (2012 stereo mix)	Fred Fassert	Beach Boys' Party!	2:13
23.	"All Summer Long" (2007 stereo mix)		All Summer Long	2:10
24.	"Help Me, Rhonda" (single version)		Summer Days (And Summer Nights!!)	2:47
25.	"Fun, Fun, Fun"		Shut Down Volume 2	2:16

=== Disc two ===
No.	Title	Writer(s)	Original album	Length
1.	"Kokomo"	Love, Melcher, Scott McKenzie, John Phillips	Cocktail OST / Still Cruisin'	3:37
2.	"You're So Good to Me" (2007 stereo mix)		Summer Days (And Summer Nights!!)	2:15
3.	"Wild Honey" (2012 stereo mix)		Wild Honey	2:38
4.	"Darlin'" (2012 stereo mix)		Wild Honey	2:12
5.	"In My Room"	B. Wilson, Gary Usher	Surfer Girl	2:13
6.	"All This Is That"	Al Jardine, C. Wilson, Love	Carl and the Passions – "So Tough"	3:59
7.	"This Whole World"	B. Wilson	Sunflower	1:57
8.	"Add Some Music to Your Day"	B. Wilson, Love, Joe Knott	Sunflower	3:33
9.	"Cotton Fields (The Cotton Song)" (single version; 2001 stereo mix)	Huddie Ledbetter	non-LP single, 1970	3:15
10.	"I Just Wasn't Made for These Times" (1996 stereo mix)	B. Wilson, Tony Asher	Pet Sounds	3:22
11.	"Sail On, Sailor"	B. Wilson, Van Dyke Parks, Tandyn Almer, Raymond Kennedy, Jack Rieley	Holland	3:18
12.	"Surf's Up"	B. Wilson, Parks	Surf's Up	4:14
13.	"Friends"	B. Wilson, C. Wilson, D. Wilson, Jardine	Friends	2:33
14.	"Heroes and Villains" (2012 stereo mix)	B. Wilson, Parks	Smile	3:36
15.	"I Can Hear Music"	Jeff Barry, Ellie Greenwich, Phil Spector	20/20	2:37
16.	"Good Timin'"	B. Wilson, C. Wilson	L.A. (Light Album)	2:13
17.	"California Saga (On My Way to Sunny Californ-i-a)"	Jardine	Holland	3:23
18.	"Isn't It Time" (single version)	B. Wilson, Love, Larry Millas, Jim Peterik, Joe Thomas	That's Why God Made the Radio	3:47
19.	"Kiss Me, Baby"		The Beach Boys Today!	2:44
20.	"That's Why God Made the Radio"	B. Wilson, Millas, Peterik, Thomas	That's Why God Made the Radio	3:19
21.	"Forever"	D. Wilson, Gregg Jakobson	Sunflower	2:41
22.	"God Only Knows" (1996 stereo mix)	B. Wilson, Asher	Pet Sounds	2:55
23.	"Sloop John B" (1996 stereo mix)	Trad. arr B. Wilson	Pet Sounds	3:03
24.	"Wouldn't It Be Nice" (2001 stereo mix)	B. Wilson, Asher, Love	Pet Sounds	2:33
25.	"Good Vibrations"		Smile	3:37

== Single disc track listing ==
All tracks written by Brian Wilson/Mike Love, unless otherwise noted.

No.	Title	Writer(s)	Original album	Length
1.	"That's Why God Made the Radio"		That's Why God Made the Radio (2012)	3:20
2.	"California Girls"		Summer Days (And Summer Nights!!) (1965)	2:47
3.	"Sloop John B"	Trad. arr B. Wilson	Pet Sounds (1966)	3:00
4.	"Wouldn't It Be Nice"	B. Wilson, Asher, Love	Pet Sounds (1966)	2:33
5.	"Surfer Girl"	B. Wilson	Surfer Girl (1963)	2:27
6.	"Do It Again" (Remastered)		20/20 (1969)	2:18
7.	"Surfin' Safari" (Mono Version, Remastered 2012)		Surfin' Safari (1962)	2:06
8.	"Surfin' U.S.A."	Chuck Berry, B. Wilson	Surfin' U.S.A. (1963)	2:29
9.	"Don't Worry Baby"		Shut Down Volume 2 (1964)	2:50
10.	"Little Deuce Coupe"	B. Wilson, Roger Christian	Surfer Girl (1963)	1:40
11.	"I Get Around"		All Summer Long (1964)	2:13
12.	"Fun, Fun, Fun"		Shut Down Volume 2 (1964)	2:20
13.	"Be True to Your School" (Remastered)		Little Deuce Coupe (1963)	2:11
14.	"Dance, Dance, Dance"	B. Wilson, Love, Carl Wilson	The Beach Boys Today! (1965)	2:04
15.	"All Summer Long"		All Summer Long (1964)	2:10
16.	"Help Me, Rhonda" (Single Version)		Summer Days (And Summer Nights!!) (1965)	2:49
17.	"Rock and Roll Music" (Remastered)	Chuck Berry	15 Big Ones (1976)	2:29
18.	"God Only Knows"	B. Wilson, Asher	Pet Sounds (1966)	2:55
19.	"Good Vibrations"		Smiley Smile (1967)	3:37
20.	"Kokomo"	Love, Melcher, Scott McKenzie, John Phillips	Cocktail OST (1988) / Still Cruisin' (1989)	3:37
