= Live – The 50th Anniversary Tour =

Live album by The Beach Boys
- Released: May 21, 2013
- Recorded: April–September 2012
- Genres: Rock, pop
- Length: 122:28
- Label: Capitol/UMe
- Producers: Brian Wilson, Joe Thomas

The Beach Boys chronology
Fifty Big Ones (2012)	Live – The 50th Anniversary Tour (2013)	Made in California (2013)

Professional ratings
Review scores
Source	Rating
AllMusic	3/5 stars
Today Online	3.5/5 stars

Live – The 50th Anniversary Tour is a live album by the Beach Boys released on May 21, 2013. The album was recorded during the band's 50th anniversary reunion tour.

== Reception ==
AllMusic reviewer Stephen Thomas Erlewine gave the album a good review, describing it as "a pleasant dose of nostalgia." The album was also criticized in several sources including The Independent as being "saturated in 'Auto-Tune'", turning the lead singers voices into "horrible metallic noises."

== Track listing ==
All tracks composed by Brian Wilson and Mike Love; except where indicated

Disc 1

1. "Do It Again" – 3:38
2. "Little Honda" – 2:06
3. "Catch a Wave" – 2:09
4. "Hawaii" – 1:46
5. "Don't Back Down" – 1:45
6. "Surfin' Safari" – 2:48
7. "Surfer Girl" (Brian Wilson) – 2:29
8. "The Little Girl I Once Knew" (Brian Wilson) – 3:09
9. "Wendy" – 2:25 (Lead vocals by Bruce Johnston)
10. "Getcha Back" (Mike Love, Terry Melcher) – 2:42 (Lead vocals by David Marks)
11. "Then I Kissed Her" (Phil Spector, Ellie Greenwich, Jeff Barry) – 2:17
12. "Marcella" (Brian Wilson, Tandyn Almer, Jack Rieley) – 3:23
13. "Isn't It Time" (Brian Wilson, Mike Love, Joe Thomas, Jim Peterik, Larry Millas) – 4:01
14. "Why Do Fools Fall in Love" (Morris Levy, Frankie Lymon) – 2:30
15. "When I Grow Up (To Be a Man)" – 2:55
16. "Disney Girls" (Bruce Johnston) – 5:33 - taken from the band’s performance in Grand Prairie, TX on April 26
17. "Be True to Your School" – 3:06
18. "Little Deuce Coupe" (Brian Wilson, Roger Christian) – 1:50
19. "409" (Brian Wilson, Mike Love, Gary Usher) – 1:52
20. "Shut Down" (Brian Wilson, Roger Christian) – 1:46
21. "I Get Around" – 2:46

Disc 2

1. "Pet Sounds" (Brian Wilson) – 3:45
2. "Add Some Music to Your Day" (Brian Wilson, Joe Knott, Mike Love) – 3:49
3. "Heroes and Villains" (Brian Wilson, Van Dyke Parks) – 3:54
4. "Sail On, Sailor" (Brian Wilson, Van Dyke Parks, Almer, Ray Kennedy, Rieley) – 3:45 (Lead vocals by Brian Wilson)
5. "California Saga: California" (Al Jardine) – 3:09
6. "In My Room" (Brian Wilson, Gary Usher) – 2:53
7. "All This Is That" (Al Jardine, Carl Wilson, Mike Love) – 3:38
8. "That's Why God Made the Radio" (Brian Wilson, Thomas, Peterik, Millas) – 4:27
9. "Forever" (Dennis Wilson, Gregg Jakobson) (Lead vocals by Dennis Wilson via archive recording) – 2:57
10. "God Only Knows" (Brian Wilson, Tony Asher) (Lead vocals by Carl Wilson via archive recording) – 2:39
11. "Sloop John B" (Traditional; arranged by Brian Wilson and Al Jardine) – 3:07
12. "Wouldn't It Be Nice" (Brian Wilson, Asher, Mike Love) (Lead vocals by Al Jardine, Jeff Foskett and Mike Love) – 2:41
13. "Good Vibrations" (Lead vocals by Brian Wilson, Jeff Foskett and Mike Love) – 4:14
14. "California Girls" – 3:15
15. "Help Me Rhonda" – 3:19
16. "Rock and Roll Music" (Chuck Berry) – 2:48
17. "Surfin' U.S.A." (Brian Wilson, Chuck Berry) – 3:00
18. "Kokomo" (Mike Love, Scott McKenzie, Tony Melcher, John Phillips) – 4:00
19. "Barbara Ann" (Fred Fassert) – 2:33
20. "Fun, Fun, Fun" – 3:29

== Personnel ==
Partial credits from Craig Slowinski.

The Beach Boys

- Al Jardine – lead, harmony and backing vocals; rhythm guitar; banjo on “California Saga: California”; additional lead guitar on "Sail On, Sailor"
- Bruce Johnston – lead, harmony and backing vocals; keyboards
- Mike Love – lead, harmony and backing vocals; percussion
- David Marks – lead, harmony and backing vocals; lead guitar
- Brian Wilson – lead, harmony and backing vocals; piano; bass on "Barbara Ann" and "Fun, Fun, Fun"
- Carl Wilson – lead vocals on "God Only Knows" (archive recording)
- Dennis Wilson – lead vocals on "Forever" (archive recording)

Supporting musicians

- Scott Bennett – harmony and backing vocals, keyboards, mallets, percussion
- Nelson Bragg – harmony and backing vocals, percussion
- John Cowsill – harmony and backing vocals, drums
- Mike D'Amico – harmony and backing vocals, bass, drums on "Marcella", "Pet Sounds", and “Add Some Music To Your Day”
- Nick "Nicky Wonder" Walusko - harmony and backing vocals, guitar
- Jeff Foskett – lead, harmony, and backing vocals; rhythm guitar; percussion; mandolin on "Disney Girls"
- Probyn Gregory – harmony and backing vocals, guitar, horns, percussion, bass on "Marcella" and “Add Some Music To Your Day”, tannerin on "Good Vibrations" and "Forever", trumpet on "Pet Sounds"
- Darian Sahanaja – harmony and backing vocals, keyboards, mallets
- Scott Totten – harmony and backing vocals, guitar, lead vocals on "Why Do Fools Fall In Love", ukulele on "Isn't It Time", bass on "Pet Sounds"
- Paul von Mertens – woodwinds (saxophones, flutes, harmonicas)
