= That's Why God Made the Radio =

Studio album by the Beach Boys
- Released: June 5, 2012
- Recorded: c. 2005 (most of “Daybreak Over the Ocean”); May 2011 – March 2012
- Studios: Ocean Way, Hollywood
- Genres: Soft rock; baroque pop
- Length: 38:53
- Label: Capitol
- Producers: Brian Wilson; Paul Fauerso

The Beach Boys chronology
The Smile Sessions (2011)	That's Why God Made the Radio (2012)	Fifty Big Ones (2012)

Singles from That's Why God Made the Radio
- 1. "That's Why God Made the Radio" Released: April 25, 2012; 2. "Isn't It Time" Released: September 28, 2012

That's Why God Made the Radio is the twenty-ninth studio album by American rock band the Beach Boys, released on June 5, 2012, by Capitol Records. Produced by Brian Wilson, the album was recorded to coincide with the band's 50th anniversary. It is their first studio album since 1996's Stars and Stripes Vol. 1, the first album to feature original material since Summer in Paradise in 1992, their first album to feature guitarist and backing vocalist David Marks since Little Deuce Coupe in 1963, their only album not to feature co-founder Carl Wilson (due to his death in 1998), and their last with Brian (before his death in 2025), Al Jardine (before his departure in 2012), and Bruce Johnston (before his departure in 2026).

Preceded by the single "That's Why God Made the Radio", the album received generally positive reviews, reached number 3 on the Billboard 200, and was their highest charting studio album of new material since 1965, placing them second all-time with longest span of top 10 albums at 49 years.

== Background ==
Jim Peterik has said that the album's title came from a comment made by Brian in response to Peterik's description of an AM radio broadcast filtering through a car's oval speaker.

According to record producer Joe Thomas, Brian Wilson circa 2008 or 2010 inquired to him about demo tapes recorded during the sessions for Wilson's 1998 solo album Imagination which Thomas co-produced: "He called up and said I've got some ideas for some new Beach Boys songs, and I said, That’s great, and I pointed out to him that when we worked together several years ago he had the genesis of some other Beach Boys songs that he had never really wanted to put on any of his solo records. That he had isolated specifically for the Beach Boys. So he asked me to compile those and it was more than a few." One of these demos was an early version of the then-future title track "That's Why God Made the Radio". Some of these early demos reportedly even featured vocals from Carl Wilson. The two proceeded to meet with Mike Love in Palm Springs, who then agreed to a collaboration.

In the late 2000s, reports began to circulate that the surviving members of the Beach Boys would reunite for a 50th Anniversary tour and album. Despite some uncertainty and initial denials, on December 16, 2011, it was announced that Brian Wilson, Mike Love, Al Jardine, Bruce Johnston and David Marks would reunite for a new album and The Beach Boys 50th Anniversary Reunion Tour. The studio reunion was kicked off by a remake of the band's 1968 single, "Do It Again", recorded earlier that May. The next day, the group recorded the album's opening track, "Think About the Days".

== Composition ==
Wilson and Love discussed the upcoming album and tour in an interview on February 16, 2012. The duo claimed that the album was halfway done, with Wilson doing most of the writing. In the same interview, Wilson said he considered the title track, "That's Why God Made the Radio", to be one of the group's best. The album ends with a Pet Sounds- and Smile-inspired suite. The suite, originally six tracks, ended up being the final four tracks on the album: "Strange World", "From There to Back Again", "Pacific Coast Highway", and "Summer's Gone." Thomas described the making:

He really wanted to do like a kind of reflection of California from the standpoint of a, you know, a guy who’s almost 70 years old. So it’s driving down Pacific Coast Highway and thinking about his life in retrospect. So this suite was a series of maybe one or two minute vignettes that he had like 15 of them that he would start and never finish. When I put them together on ProTools, it was eerie to me that they all fit together. It was like, wow. This song was written a year before the song that followed it, but yet they fit completely perfectly: modulation, key move, the whole thing. Then Brian started assembling these little bits and I kind of dreamed… I was 10 years old when Smile was recorded, but I kind of dreamed that was how that happened. I have no special authority to tell you that’s how it did. It just seemed like all these little pieces became like this theme, and instead of being Americana or whatever Smile was, it was his drive down Pacific Coast Highway.

Sometimes he’ll have a great chorus and I’ll just add a couple lines in a verse. Or a lot of times we’ll just play. What Brian likes is chords. So I’ll play the piano and I’ll play maybe five or six or seven chord progressions, and we’ll just sit there. And sometimes he won’t say anything, and then all of sudden he’ll come up with this brilliant melody while I’m playing the chords.

— Joe Thomas

Many of the songs, classified as baroque pop, were written in collaboration with Thomas, whose input sometimes included entire chord progressions. Some songs were already years-old finished compositions: "That's Why God Made the Radio" was written by Brian Wilson, Jim Peterik, Joe Thomas and Larry Millas in the late 1990s. Purportedly, "about 80 hours worth" of demo tapes were sourced from that period. "Spring Vacation" originated during Imagination and contained new lyrics by Love written reportedly in five minutes.

28 songs were written/recorded for the album, including "From There to Back Again", "Isn't It Time", "Beaches in Mind", "Shelter", "The Private Life of Bill and Sue", and "Summer's Gone". "Summer's Gone" was originally intended by Wilson to be the title track and final song on the album, with the intention that it would be the final Beach Boys album. This was changed when Wilson decided he would like to record a follow-up. Due to his falling out with Love, however, Thomas and Wilson's ambitions were instead realized on Wilson's 2015 album No Pier Pressure. The song was written in reflection of his mother's death and the end of Carl's life, who died two months after their mother. The song "Daybreak Over the Ocean" was originally recorded in 1978 by Love for his first, as yet unreleased solo album, First Love.

Thomas describes the two sides of the album as the "dark side" and the "sunny side", and also believed that it was important for a Beach Boys album to have a sunny side, catering to both "hardcore Brian Wilson fans" and "Beach Boys fans". For the album, Wilson is credited as the sole producer, a first for the group since 1977's Love You, while Love is credited as executive producer, and Thomas for "recording". Thomas explained these roles:

Brian is still, as you would imagine, the taskmaster in terms of what people play. He’s in charge of those sessions. ... He arranges all the vocals and produces the record. I record it because I think he really likes the fact that technically… you gotta kind of keep up on all the techniques that are available to us right now and that’s kind of what my role is. He’s not going to tell me to use an SM-58 microphone instead of a U-67. He trusts me in that way. But he’s the producer in absolutely every way. I couldn’t even begin to think that anybody could produce Brian Wilson. It would be like how can anybody direct Richard Burton, you know?

In 2013, however, Love stated that he was disappointed with the album's creative process. "I was hoping to get together with Brian on That's Why God Made the Radio, but a guy who was involved in the production of that album engineered it otherwise," Love explains, "I talked to Brian about a year before we even started doing any of the recording for [the album]. He and I talked about doing a project and he was excited about doing it, but it never came to fruition at all. It was given another direction—not by me and not by Brian but by others. We were supposed to be allowed to get together to write songs from scratch like we did in the '60s, but that was never to be."

Prior to release, Al Jardine stated that Carl Wilson's voice would be featured on the new album, as a song he had recorded would finally be used, titled "Waves of Love". Jardine expressed regret over the inability to incorporate Dennis Wilson as well. However, while pre-recorded segments from both Carl and Dennis Wilson were featured during concerts on the band's 50th Anniversary Tour, "Waves of Love" did not end up on the final version of the album. According to Bruce Johnston before its release, the album's track listing was determined by Capitol.

During the band's June 15, 2012 show, a slight revision of "Isn't It Time" was performed, with some lyrics altered and a different vocal arrangement for the song's bridge. These revisions later appeared on the song's single release.

== Release ==
=== Promotion ===
The first single from the album, "That's Why God Made the Radio", made its national radio debut April 25, 2012, on ESPN's Mike and Mike in the Morning. It was released to the band's YouTube channel later that same day, with accompanying lyrics. In addition, the song has been released and is now available as a single on digital outlets such as iTunes and Amazon. As of September 2012, the album's title track, "Isn't It Time", and "Summer's Gone" have been the only songs from the album to be performed live.

The band appeared on various television shows throughout the tour performing the song, including an hour-long performance and interview segment on the shopping channel QVC in which close to 20,000 copies of the album were sold. QVC gave away an exclusive eleven track greatest hits CD with the purchase of the album. The hits CD was not available anywhere else. On May 1, 2012, Walmart scheduled an exclusive limited edition 50th anniversary collection 'ZinePak, to include a 72-page magazine with rare photos and new interviews with the group, as well as an 11-song CD including the group's recent re-recording of "Do It Again".

Doin' It Again, an hour-long documentary that aired during the summer of 2012 on PBS, was released on DVD and Blu-ray August 28, 2012. The documentary features a new biography with new interviews of the current lineup, footage of the band recording the new album, and live performances from the 50th anniversary tour. In November 2012, a DVD and Blu-ray titled The Beach Boys Live in Concert: 50th Anniversary was released featuring a performance by the band from July 2012 in Phoenix, AZ. The release featured a heavily edited performance which was cut down to sixty minutes and only 21 of the 50 songs performed. There was also mention of plans to release a DVD of their performance at Red Rocks although nothing has been officially announced.

=== Critical reception ===
Professional ratings
Aggregate scores
Source	Rating
Metacritic	64/100
Review scores
Source	Rating
AllMusic	3.5/5 stars
Consequence of Sound	B−
Digital Spy	4/5 stars
Entertainment Weekly	B+
The Guardian	3/5 stars
Los Angeles Times	3/4 stars
NME	6/10
Paste	6.0/10
Rolling Stone	3/5 stars
Spin	6/10

According to Bruce Johnston, the album's overall aesthetic compares to their 1970 album Sunflower. It received generally favorable reviews, and reviewers unanimously highlighted the album's four-song closing suite as its crowning moment, which Consequence of Sound called "a funeral dirge full of majesty" and The Guardian touted "the best thing Brian Wilson has put his name to in the last 30 years."

Some critics were disparaging of the other more upbeat and lighthearted tracks in comparison, and one reviewer accused the band of using Auto-Tune. Others accredited the album's low points specifically to Mike Love's contributions, as NOW Magazine wrote "Since 'Ronald Reagan-lite Love' thinks the Beach Boys’ best period was their most profitable, we get bankable early 60s simplicity and zero evidence that these guys were once the coolest, funniest, strangest guys in music." Beats Per Minute summarized, "The album as a whole isn't flawless, yet by sounding utterly enchanting during its climax it leaves a listener feeling genuinely touched."

=== Commercial performance ===
The album debuted at No. 3 in the US album charts and became the group's highest-charting album in 38 years—since 1974's compilation Endless Summer and highest-charting studio album since 1965's Summer Days (And Summer Nights!!). It also became the band's first US top 10 studio album since 1976's 15 Big Ones and the highest-debuting album of their entire career. The album made its debut in the UK charts at number 15 giving the group their highest studio album debut since 1971's Surf's Up. The album debuted at number 15 on the Canadian Albums Chart.

== Track listing ==
=== Compact disc and web release ===
All tracks are written by Brian Wilson and Joe Thomas except where noted.

No.	Title	Writer(s)	Lead vocal(s)	Length
1.	"Think About the Days"		All	1:27
2.	"That's Why God Made the Radio"	B. Wilson; Thomas; Larry Millas; Jim Peterik	B. Wilson; Al Jardine; Jeffrey Foskett; Bruce Johnston; Mike Love	3:19
3.	"Isn't It Time"	B. Wilson; Love; Thomas; Millas; Peterik	B. Wilson; Johnston; Jardine; Love; Foskett	3:45
4.	"Spring Vacation"	B. Wilson; Love; Thomas	Love; Johnston; B. Wilson	3:06
5.	"The Private Life of Bill and Sue"		B. Wilson; Foskett	4:17
6.	"Shelter"		B. Wilson; Foskett	3:02
7.	"Daybreak Over the Ocean"	Love	Love	4:20
8.	"Beaches in Mind"	B. Wilson; Love; Thomas	Love	2:38
9.	"Strange World"		B. Wilson	3:03
10.	"From There to Back Again"		Jardine; B. Wilson	3:23
11.	"Pacific Coast Highway"		B. Wilson; Foskett	1:47
12.	"Summer's Gone"	B. Wilson; Jon Bon Jovi; Thomas	B. Wilson	4:41
Total length:				38:53

=== Vinyl release ===
Side one
No.	Title	Writer(s)	Lead vocals	Length
1.	"Think About the Days"		All	1:27
2.	"That's Why God Made the Radio"	B. Wilson; Thomas; Millas; Peterik	B. Wilson; Jardine; Foskett; Johnston; Love	3:19
3.	"Isn't It Time"	B. Wilson; Love; Thomas; Millas; Peterik	B. Wilson; Johnston; Jardine; Love; Foskett	3:45
4.	"Spring Vacation"	B. Wilson; Love; Thomas	Love; Johnston; B. Wilson	3:06
5.	"Beaches in Mind"	B. Wilson; Love; Thomas	Love	2:38
6.	"Daybreak Over the Ocean"	Love	Love	4:20

Side two
No.	Title	Writer(s)	Lead vocals	Length
7.	"Shelter"		B. Wilson; Foskett	3:02
8.	"The Private Life of Bill and Sue"		B. Wilson; Foskett	4:17
9.	"Strange World"		B. Wilson	3:03
10.	"From There to Back Again"		Jardine; B. Wilson	3:23
11.	"Pacific Coast Highway"		B. Wilson; Foskett	1:47
12.	"Summer's Gone"	B. Wilson; Bon Jovi; Thomas	B. Wilson	4:41

=== Bonus tracks ===
Japanese edition bonus track
No.	Title	Writer(s)	Lead vocals	Length
13.	"Do It Again" (2012 version)	B. Wilson; Love	Love; B. Wilson	2:57

50 Years of Hits |}

All tracks are written by Brian Wilson and Mike Love except where noted.

50 Years of Hits (QVC exclusive CD)
No.	Title	Writer(s)	Lead vocals	Length
1.	"Catch a Wave"		Love; B. Wilson	2:07
2.	"Surfin' Safari"		Love	2:05
3.	"409"	B. Wilson; Love; Gary Usher	Love	1:59
4.	"God Only Knows"	B. Wilson; Tony Asher	Carl Wilson	2:49
5.	"California Girls"		Love	2:38
6.	"Heroes and Villains"	B. Wilson; Van Dyke Parks	B. Wilson	3:37
7.	"Surfer Girl"	B. Wilson	B. Wilson	2:26
8.	"Wouldn't It Be Nice"	B. Wilson; Asher; Love	B. Wilson; Love	2:22
9.	"Little Honda"		Love	1:52
10.	"Dance, Dance, Dance"		Love; Wilson	1:59
11.	"Do It Again"		Love	2:57

50th Anniversary Collection

All tracks are written by Brian Wilson and Mike Love except where noted.

50th Anniversary Collection (Reader's Digest Remastered Deluxe Edition)
No.	Title	Writer(s)	Lead vocals	Length
1.	"Wouldn't It Be Nice"	B. Wilson; Asher; Love	B. Wilson; Love	2:22
2.	"Surfin' U.S.A."	B. Wilson; Chuck Berry	Love	2:27
3.	"Good Vibrations"		C. Wilson; B. Wilson; Love	3:36
4.	"I Get Around"		Love; B. Wilson	2:13
5.	"Sloop John B"	traditional, arranged by B. Wilson	B. Wilson; Love	2:56
6.	"Rock and Roll Music"	Berry	Love	2:29
7.	"Surfer Girl"	B. Wilson	B. Wilson	2:26
8.	"Do You Wanna Dance?"	Bobby Freeman	Dennis Wilson	2:19
9.	"Surfin' Safari"		Love	2:05
10.	"God Only Knows"	B. Wilson; Asher	C. Wilson	2:49
11.	"Little Honda"		Love	1:52
12.	"It's OK"		Love	2:12
13.	"California Dreamin'"	John Phillips; Michelle Phillips	Jardine; C. Wilson	3:12
14.	"Disney Girls (1957)"	Johnston	Johnston	4:07
15.	"Then I Kissed Her"	Phil Spector; Ellie Greenwich; Jeff Barry	Jardine	2:15
16.	"Why Do Fools Fall in Love"	Frankie Lymon; M. Levy	B. Wilson	2:07
17.	"You're So Good to Me"		B. Wilson	2:14
18.	"Let Him Run Wild"		B. Wilson	2:20
19.	"Help Me, Rhonda"		Jardine	2:46
20.	"Barbara Ann"	Fred Fassert	B. Wilson; Dean Torrence	3:23
21.	"California Girls"		Love	2:38
22.	"Fun, Fun, Fun"		Love	2:03
23.	"Be True to Your School"		Love	2:06
24.	"Dance, Dance, Dance"	B. Wilson; C. Wilson; Love	Love; B. Wilson	1:59
25.	"Do It Again"		Love; B. Wilson	2:25
26.	"Heroes and Villains"	B. Wilson; Parks	B. Wilson	3:37
27.	"Little Deuce Coupe"	B. Wilson; Roger Christian	Love	1:38
28.	"Catch a Wave"		Love; B. Wilson	2:11
29.	"409"	B. Wilson; Love; Usher	Love	1:59
30.	"Vegetables"	B. Wilson; Parks	Jardine; B. Wilson; Love	2:07
31.	"All This Is That"	Jardine; C. Wilson; Love	C. Wilson; Jardine; Love	4:00
32.	"'Til I Die"	B. Wilson	B. Wilson; C. Wilson; Love	2:41
33.	"Cool, Cool Water"		B. Wilson; Love	5:03
34.	"Don't Go Near the Water"	Love; Jardine	Love; Jardine	2:39
35.	"Wonderful"	B. Wilson; Parks	C. Wilson	2:21
36.	"You're Welcome"	B. Wilson	B. Wilson	1:07

== Personnel ==
According to the album's liner notes.

(track number in parentheses)

=== The Beach Boys ===
- Brian Wilson – vocals (1–6, 8–12), additional vocals (7)
- Mike Love – vocals (all tracks)
- Al Jardine – vocals (1–6, 8–12), additional vocals (7), whistling (10)
- Bruce Johnston – vocals (1–6, 8–12), additional vocals (7)
- David Marks – guitar (2–6, 8, 12)

=== Additional musicians ===
- Jeffrey Foskett – vocals (1–6, 8–12), additional vocals (7), acoustic guitar (2, 4–6), snaps (5)
- Adrian Baker – vocals (7)
- Christian Love – vocals (7)
- Hayleigh Love – vocals (7)
- Skip Masters – radio voiceover (5)
- Tom Bukovac – guitar (2, 4, 10), acoustic guitar (5, 12), electric guitar (6)
- Jim Riley – guitar (4, 8)
- Nick Rowe – guitar (2)
- Scott Totten – acoustic and electric guitar (7)
- Nick Walusko – guitar (2, 4, 12)
- Jeff "Skunk" Baxter – electric guitar (4), guitar (8)
- Probyn Gregory – acoustic guitar (5, 8), banjo (5), French horn (1, 6, 11, 12), trombone (6)
- Chad Cromwell – drums (2, 4, 9)
- John Cowsill – drums (5, 8), snaps (5)
- Curt Bisquera – drums (7)
- Eddie Bayers – drums (12)
- Michael Rhodes – bass (2, 4, 9, 10, 12)
- Larry Millas – bass (3)
- Brett Simons – bass (5, 8, 12)
- Cliff Hugo – bass (7)
- Joe Thomas – piano (1, 11, 12), harpsichord (6), organ (8), tack piano (12), snaps (5)
- John Hobbs – piano (2, 5), tack piano (6, 9, 10)
- Scott Bennett – organ (2, 4, 8), clavinet (4, 8), vibes (1, 5, 12)
- Darian Sahanaja – vibes (2, 5)
- Paul Fauerso – keyboards and percussion (7)
- Gary Griffin – accordion (9)
- Nelson Bragg – timpani (5), percussion (5, 6, 9, 11, 12)
- Jessica Bish – snaps (5)
- Jim Peterik – ukulele (3), percussion (3)
- Paul Mertens – baritone saxophone (5), string arrangements (9–11), flute (10–12)
- Joel Deroulin, Sharon Jackson, Peter Kent, Songa Lee, Julie Rogers, John Wittenberg – violins (10, 11)
- Alisha Bauer, Vanessa Freebarin-Smith – cellos (10, 11)
- David "Stoney" Stone – double bass (12)
- Chris Bleth – oboe (12)

=== Recording personnel ===
- Brian Wilson – producer and arranger
- Mike Love – executive producer
- Joe Thomas – recording
- Paul Fauerso – producer and recording (7)
- Frank Pappalardo – recording, mixing engineer
- Michael Czaszwicz – additional engineering
- Wesley M. Seidman – additional engineering
- Larry Millas – additional engineering
- Tom Gordon – additional engineering
- Bob Ludwig – mastering

=== Artwork ===
- Lawrence Azerrad – graphic design
- Guy Webster – photography

== Charts ==
=== Weekly charts ===
Chart (2012)	Peak position
Australian Albums (ARIA)	31
Austrian Albums (Ö3 Austria)	42
Belgian Albums (Ultratop Flanders)	35
Belgian Albums (Ultratop Wallonia)	46
Canadian Albums (Billboard)	14
Danish Albums (Hitlisten)	12
Dutch Albums (Album Top 100)	24
Finnish Albums (Suomen virallinen lista)	31
French Albums (SNEP)	80
German Albums (Offizielle Top 100)	36
Irish Albums (IRMA)	50
Italian Albums (FIMI)	39
Japanese Albums (Oricon)	18
Norwegian Albums (VG-lista)	8
Scottish Albums (Official Charts)	15
Spanish Albums (Promusicae)	49
Swedish Albums (Sverigetopplistan)	13
Swiss Albums (Schweizer Hitparade)	36
UK Albums (Official Charts)	15
US Billboard 200	3

=== Year-end charts ===
Chart (2012)	Position
US Billboard 200	192
