= From There to Back Again =

Song by the Beach Boys

from the album That's Why God Made the Radio
- Released: June 5, 2012
- Length: 3:23
- Label: Capitol
- Songwriters: Brian Wilson, Joe Thomas
- Producer: Brian Wilson

"From There to Back Again" is a song by the American rock band the Beach Boys from their 2012 album That's Why God Made the Radio. Written by Brian Wilson and Joe Thomas, the song features Al Jardine and Wilson in the lead vocals, and is part of a four-song suite which concludes the album.

The song received critical acclaim from critics, who variously praised it for Jardine's vocal performance, its harmonies, and melodic beauty, with at least one considering it among the band's best ballads since the 1960s.

== Composition ==
"From There to Back Again" was one of the new songs composed for the album That's Why God Made the Radio, and is the sole new song from its concluding four-song suite, which includes "Strange World", "Pacific Coast Highway", and "Summer's Gone".

== Reception ==
"From There to Back Again" received critical acclaim from critics. John Bush of Allmusic deemed it the "most beautiful" song of That's Why God Made the Radio and "one of their best ballads since the '60s", stating that it is "a Side 2 ballad epic that Wilson frames impeccably around Jardine's voice, aging but still sweet." John Bergstrom of PopMatters described it as "ponderous, swooning... as the harmonies swirl around [Jardine] like the sun itself", while Andrew Leahey of The Washington Times favorably compared it to "I Just Wasn't Made for These Times". Alex Phillimore of Beats Per Minute stated that the song "sounds both youthful and beautiful. ... It could easily be a song from their professional peak".

In terms of composition, Jim Beviglia of American Songwriter considered both "From There to Back Again" and the album's next track "Pacific Coast Highway" impressive for their "offbeat chord changes and freeform structure, displaying the kind of inventiveness for which Wilson is known." Jim Farber of New York Daily News wrote that "Jardine's amber voice idealizes the melody in Wilson's [song]". Ryan Reed of Paste praised the song as "absolutely stunning" for its "particularly intricate harmonic development, lovely flute runs, and a stand-out lead vocal from Al Jardine".

Alexis Petridis of The Guardian considered the concluding suite the song is a part of as "easily the best thing Brian Wilson has put his name to in the last 30 years." Randall Roberts of Los Angeles Times shared this sentiment, writing that the last three songs "are as exquisitely rendered as anything in the group's catalog", while Bergstrom concluded that "it's neither a reach nor hyperbole to say this final suite is among the strongest, most affecting music Wilson has ever recorded."

== Personnel ==
According to That's Why God Made the Radio album liner notes.

The Beach Boys

- Brian Wilson – vocals
- Mike Love – vocals
- Al Jardine – vocals, whistle
- Bruce Johnston – vocals

Additional musicians

- Jeffrey Foskett – vocals
- Tom Bukovac – guitar
- Michael Rhodes – bass
- John Hobbs – tack piano
- Joel Deroulin, Sharon Jackson, Peter Kent, Songa Lee, Julie Rogers, John Wittenberg – violins
- Alisha Bauer, Vanessa Freebarin-Smith – cellos
- Paul Mertens – string arrangements, flute
