= Stars and Stripes Vol. 1 =

Studio album by The Beach Boys and various artists
- Released: August 19, 1996
- Recorded: October 5, 1995 – June 12, 1996
- Genre: Country pop
- Length: 37:47
- Label: River North
- Producers: Joe Thomas; Brian Wilson

The Beach Boys chronology
Good Vibrations: Thirty Years of The Beach Boys (1993)	Stars and Stripes Vol. 1 (1996)	The Pet Sounds Sessions (1997)

Singles from Stars and Stripes Vol. 1
- 1. "Little Deuce Coupe" (with James House)" Released: July 22, 1996; 2. "I Can Hear Music" (with Kathy Troccoli)" Released: 1996; 3. "Don't Worry Baby" (with Lorrie Morgan)" Released: 1996; 4. "Long Tall Texan" (with Doug Supernaw)" Released: 1996

Professional ratings
Review scores
Source	Rating
AllMusic	1.5/5 stars
Encyclopedia of Popular Music	1/5 stars
Entertainment Weekly	D

Stars and Stripes Vol. 1 is the twenty-eighth studio album by American rock band the Beach Boys, released on August 19, 1996, by River North Records. Produced by Joe Thomas and Brian Wilson, Stars and Stripes is a collaborative album between the Beach Boys and various country acts.

== Recording ==
The idea for the album was conceived by Joe Thomas, then the owner of River North Records, after a promoter suggested Hank Williams Jr. record the group's "Help Me, Rhonda".

The first track on the album to be recorded was Willie Nelson's cover of "The Warmth of the Sun", which was recorded October 5 and 6, 1995 at Pedernales Studios in Austin, Texas. The track was completed on October 7 at Sound Stage in Nashville. Thomas stated in Billboard, "Willie was the catalyst for the project. He walked into the studio from his barbecue and cut that. When Willie sang the first lines, the guys gave him a standing ovation, and we knew right away it would work."

Mike Love stated of Lorrie Morgan's rendition of "Don't Worry Baby", "It's really interesting hearing a female singing lead on it, and she sings so damn great."

Kathy Troccoli's version of "I Can Hear Music" was recorded on June 12, 1996 at Emerald Studios in Nashville.

According to Brian Wilson's wife Melinda, during the album's recording, "They [the Beach Boys] treated [Brian] like an invalid, all the time saying, 'Do this, don't do that, are you okay?'"

During the sessions, Tammy Wynette recorded a duet version of "In My Room" with Brian Wilson. The track was saved for a planned second country album by the Beach Boys, along with versions of "Sail On, Sailor" with Rodney Crowell and "Surfer Girl" with Ronnie Milsap. Wynette's version of "In My Room" appeared on the 1998 compilation album Tammy Wynette Remembered.

Al Jardine wanted his song "Island in the Sun" to be included on the album. In 2025, Jardine stated, "We happened to be in the studio, and we cut it in about five minutes and went home, and it stayed on the shelf. That's how it evolves in our world." Jardine later completed the track for his 2025 EP of the same title.

== Release ==
Prior to the release of Stars and Stripes, the Beach Boys promoted the album by appearing at the TNN/Music City News Country Awards in June 1996, where they performed "I Get Around" with Sawyer Brown.

In July, Billboard announced that two making-of specials were in development for CBS and The Disney Channel, respectively. A documentary, The Beach Boys: Nashville Sounds, aired on November 23 on The Disney Channel.

=== Singles ===
On July 22, 1996, James House's rendition of "Little Deuce Coupe" was released to country radio as the lead single from the album. House performed the song with the Beach Boys on Late Show with David Letterman and joined them in concert at a performance in Wallingford, Connecticut in August.

A music video was produced for Doug Supernaw and the Beach Boys' cover of "Long Tall Texan".

== Critical reception and legacy ==
According to Billboard, the album sold over 8,000 units in its first week of release.

In music critic Stephen Thomas Erlewine's description, the release was "an unmitigated disaster and an outright embarrassment for all involved". The album's failure prevented Brian from securing a record contract, leaving his highly anticipated recording collaborations with Andy Paley in limbo. Stars and Stripes became the last studio album to feature Carl Wilson, who died in 1998.

== Track listing ==
Stars and Stripes Vol. 1 track listing
No.	Title	Writer(s)	Lead vocals / featured artist	Length
1.	"Don't Worry, Baby"	Brian Wilson, Roger Christian	Lorrie Morgan	3:16
2.	"Little Deuce Coupe"	Wilson, Christian	James House	2:50
3.	"409"	Wilson, Mike Love, Gary Usher	Junior Brown	2:20
4.	"Long, Tall Texan"	Henry Strzelecki	Doug Supernaw	4:02
5.	"I Get Around"	Wilson, Love	Sawyer Brown	2:29
6.	"Be True to Your School"	Wilson, Love	Toby Keith	3:18
7.	"Fun, Fun, Fun"	Wilson, Love	Ricky Van Shelton	2:20
8.	"Help Me, Rhonda"	Wilson, Love	T. Graham Brown	3:10
9.	"The Warmth of the Sun"	Wilson, Love	Willie Nelson	3:18
10.	"Sloop John B"	Traditional; arranged by Wilson	Collin Raye	3:45
11.	"I Can Hear Music"	Jeff Barry, Ellie Greenwich, Phil Spector	Kathy Troccoli	3:14
12.	"Caroline, No"	Wilson, Tony Asher	Timothy B. Schmit	3:19

== Personnel ==
Credits from album liner notes.

The Beach Boys

- Al Jardine – harmony and backing vocals
- Bruce Johnston – harmony and backing vocals
- Mike Love – harmony and backing vocals, executive producer
- Brian Wilson – harmony and backing vocals, producer
- Carl Wilson – harmony and backing vocals (except "Long Tall Texan")

Special guests

- Lorrie Morgan – lead vocals on “Don’t Worry Baby”
- James House – lead vocals on “Little Deuce Coupe”
- Junior Brown – lead vocals and slide "guit–steel" on "409"
- Doug Supernaw – lead vocals on “Long Tall Texan”
- Mark Miller of Sawyer Brown – lead vocals on “I Get Around”
- Toby Keith – lead vocals on “Be True To Your School”
- Ricky Van Shelton – lead vocals on “Fun, Fun, Fun”
- T. Graham Brown – lead vocals on “Help Me, Rhonda”
- Willie Nelson – lead vocals on “The Warmth of the Sun”
- Collin Raye – lead vocals on “Sloop John B”
- Kathy Troccoli – lead vocals on “I Can Hear Music”
- Timothy B. Schmit – lead and additional backing vocals on “Caroline, No”

Additional musicians

- Matt Jardine – harmony and backing vocals, handclaps on "I Get Around", second verse lead vocals on "Sloop John B."
- Brent Rowan – acoustic guitar on "Don't Worry Baby", "Little Deuce Coupe", "Long Tall Texan", "I Get Around", "Fun, Fun, Fun", "Help Me, Rhonda", "The Warmth of the Sun", "Sloop John B.", "I Can Hear Music" and "Caroline, No"; electric guitar on "Little Deuce Coupe", "409" and "Long Tall Texan", "I Get Around", "Be True To Your School", "Fun, Fun, Fun", "Help Me, Rhonda", "The Warmth of the Sun", and "Sloop John B."; Dobro on "Long Tall Texan"
- Greg Leisz – electric guitar on "I Get Around", "Be True To Your School", "Help Me, Rhonda" and "Caroline, No"; acoustic guitar on "I Get Around"; pedal steel on "Don’t Worry Baby", "The Warmth of the Sun" and "Caroline, No"
- Eddie Bayers – drums; percussion on "The Warmth of the Sun"
- Michael Rhodes – bass
- Jackie Bertoni – percussion on "Don't Worry Baby" and "Caroline, No"
- Joe Thomas – piano on "409"; additional keyboards on "I Get Around" and "I Can Hear Music"; percussion on "Sloop John B." and "I Can Hear Music"; handclaps on "I Get Around"; producer
- Larry Franklin – fiddle on "Long Tall Texan", "The Warmth of the Sun", and "Sloop John B."
- Steve Nathan – piano on "I Get Around" and "Be True To Your School"; organ on "I Get Around"; B3 on "Help Me Rhonda"; keyboards on "Sloop John B"
- Richie Cannata – saxophone on "I Get Around" and "I Can Hear Music", handclaps on "I Get Around"
- Mickey Raphael – harmonica on "The Warmth of the Sun"
- Sonny Garrish – pedal steel on "Sloop John B."
- Henry Gross – additional harmony and backing vocals on "I Can Hear Music"
- Bill Ruppert – electric guitar on "I Can Hear Music"
- Drew Jardine – finger snaps on "I Can Hear Music"
- Robbie Jardine – finger snaps on "I Can Hear Music"
- Steve Eisen – flute on "Caroline, No"
- Jimmy Webb – string arrangements on "Caroline, No"
- Nashville String Machine – orchestra on "Caroline, No"

== Charts ==
Album

Chart (1996)	Peak Position
U.S. Billboard 200	101
U.S. Billboard Top Country Albums	12
Canada RPM Country Albums	11

Singles

Year	Single	Chart positions		
Year	Single	US AC	US Country	CAN Country
1996	"I Can Hear Music" (with Kathy Troccoli)	16		
1996	"Don't Worry Baby" (with Lorrie Morgan)		73	
1996	"Little Deuce Coupe" (with James House)		69	41
1996	"Long Tall Texan" (with Doug Supernaw)		69	82
