= Isn't It Time =

Isn't It Time may refer to:

- "Isn't It Time" (The Babys song)
- "Isn't It Time" (The Beach Boys song)
