= Isn't It Time (The Beach Boys song) =

Single by The Beach Boys

from the album That's Why God Made the Radio
- B-side: "Isn't It Time" (instrumental)
- Released: September 28, 2012
- Recorded: 2011–2012
- Studio: Ocean Way Recorders, Hollywood
- Genre: Soft rock
- Length: 3:45
- Label: Capitol
- Songwriters: Brian Wilson, Mike Love, Joe Thomas, Jim Peterik, Larry Millas
- Producer: Brian Wilson

The Beach Boys singles chronology
"That's Why God Made the Radio" (2012)	"Isn't It Time" (2012)

"Isn't It Time" is a song from the American rock group, The Beach Boys. The song is the second single released from the band's twenty-ninth studio album, That's Why God Made the Radio. The album release is significantly different.

The single mix of "Isn't It Time" was released as a single with the back side being the instrumental mix of the song. An EP titled Isn't It Time was released with live versions of "California Girls", "Do It Again" and "Sail On, Sailor" from Chicago on September 28, 2012 on iTunes. The single mix was also included on The Beach Boys 2012 compilation album Fifty Big Ones. It is significantly remixed and partially re-recorded compared to the album release. According to Mike Love, "We actually did a little bit of extra work on the bridge to make it more of a four-part (harmony) thing and changed the lyric a little bit as well."

== Personnel ==
According to That's Why God Made the Radio album liner notes.

The Beach Boys

- Brian Wilson – vocals
- Mike Love – vocals
- Al Jardine – vocals
- Bruce Johnston – vocals
- David Marks – guitar

Additional musicians

- Jeff Foskett – vocals
- Jim Peterik – ukulele, percussion
- Larry Millas – bass
