= Don't Worry Baby =

1964 single by the Beach Boys

- U.S. picture sleeve (reverse)

Single by the Beach Boys

from the album Shut Down Volume 2
- A-side: "I Get Around"
- Released: May 11, 1964
- Recorded: January 7–9, 1964
- Studio: Western, Hollywood
- Genre: Pop; rock and roll; hot rod rock; sunshine pop
- Length: 2:47
- Label: Capitol
- Songwriters: Brian Wilson; Roger Christian
- Producer: Brian Wilson

The Beach Boys singles chronology
"Fun, Fun, Fun" (1964)	"Don't Worry Baby" (1964)	"When I Grow Up (To Be a Man)" (1964)

Music video
- "Don't Worry Baby" on YouTube

Audio sample
- file; help

"Don't Worry Baby" is a song by the American rock band the Beach Boys from their March 1964 album Shut Down Volume 2. Written by Brian Wilson and Roger Christian, Wilson's lead vocal is considered one of his defining performances, and he later referred to the song as one of the band's finest records. It was issued as the B-side of "I Get Around" in May 1964 and charted separately at number 24.

Inspired by Wilson's admiration for the Ronettes' 1963 single "Be My Baby", "Don't Worry Baby" shares a comparable musical structure but diverges in lyrical themes and production. Its narrative centers on a man who boasts his way into a drag race, regrets his decision, and is reassured by his girlfriend repeating the titular refrain. Initially intended for the Ronettes, the song was rejected by their producer Phil Spector, leading Wilson to produce it with the Beach Boys, who performed all instrumental parts.

"Don't Worry Baby" is included in several retrospective rankings of all-time greatest songs, including those by Spin and Rolling Stone. A cover version by B.J. Thomas surpassed the original's commercial performance, peaking at number 17 in the U.S. and topping Canadian charts. The Beach Boys revisited the song in 1996 for their album Stars and Stripes Vol. 1, recording a duet with Lorrie Morgan. Other acts who have recorded the song include the Bay City Rollers and Ronnie Spector.

== Background ==
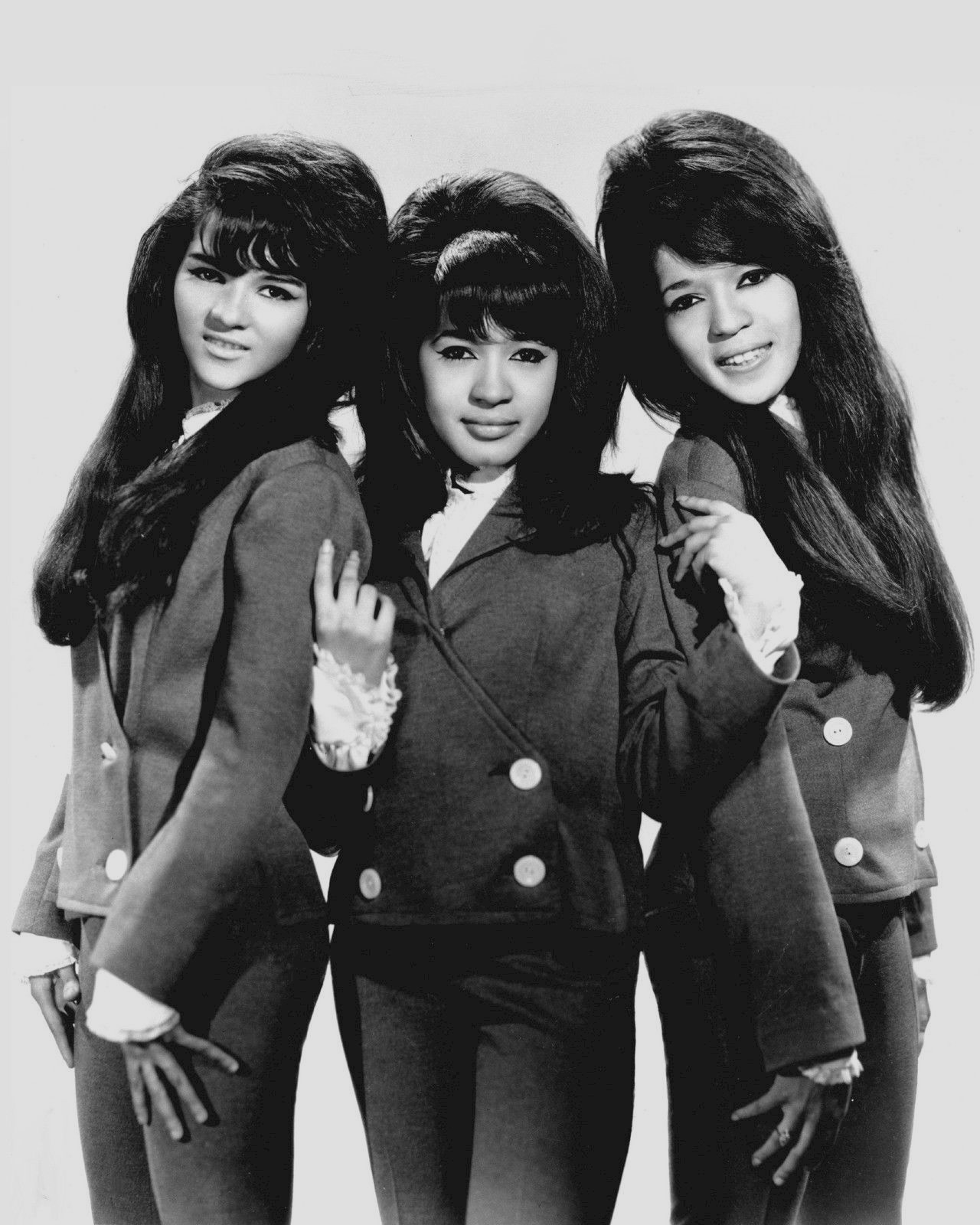
Wilson unsuccessfully offered "Don't Worry Baby" to the Ronettes

"Don't Worry Baby" was composed by Brian Wilson at his home in Hawthorne, California. It was conceived as a response to "Be My Baby", a recent hit by the Ronettes that had amazed and inspired Wilson. In his 1991 memoir, Wouldn't It Be Nice: My Own Story, it is stated that Wilson adopted the song title phrase from his then-girlfriend Marilyn Rovell shortly after hearing "Be My Baby" for the first time. In a 2009 interview, he said that he composed "Don't Worry Baby" over the course of two days. "I started out with the verse idea and then wrote the chorus. It was a very simple and beautiful song. It's a really heart and soul song, I really did feel that in my heart."

The memoir provides further details of the collaboration: "I called [my] lyricist Roger Christian and told him I had an idea. He met me one afternoon at my parents' house, where, in one of our last collaborations, we wrote a lush ballad whose title and chorus came directly from Marilyn's comforting words, 'Don't Worry, Baby.' I knew the song was a smash before we finished writing it." On another occasion, Wilson recalled, "I met [Roger] in the parking lot at KFWB and he presented the lyrics for me. I went home and wrote the song in about an hour-and-a-half."

Wilson considered having the song recorded by the Ronettes and their producer, Phil Spector, instead of the Beach Boys. In the memoir, it is stated that Wilson changed his mind after discussing the idea with Christian. However, Spector had a general policy against recording songs that he did not write. In 1994, Ronnie Spector recalled that she and Wilson had discussed "Don't Worry Baby" in 1963 on the only prior occasion they had met: "It was the follow-up to 'Be My Baby,' and [Brian] came running into Gold Star Studios and said, 'I wrote a great song for you!' But of course [Phil] didn't do the writing on it, so [we didn't record it]." She would eventually cover the song as a solo performer on the She Talks to Rainbows EP.

== Lyrics ==
Like previous songs written by Wilson and Christian, "Don't Worry Baby" portrays a hot-rod themed setting; however, unlike "Shut Down" and "Little Deuce Coupe", the song has a more melancholic mood. The lyrics are told from the perspective of a man who regrets involving himself in a drag race. As he confesses his shame to his girlfriend, she consoles him with the song's title phrase. Biographer Timothy White observed that the song avoids "the darker chill" of "Be My Baby"; rather, "Wilson composed a hapless love token that showed its strength in its sudden, surpassing humility." Catch a Wave author Peter Ames Carlin wrote that Christian drew on Wilson's "stage fright and romantic insecurities" to write the lyrics. Carlin adds,

The earlier verses contrasted the narrator's lust for his girl—"She makes me come alive"—with his fears regarding the power of his car: "I guess I should have kept my mouth shut when I started to brag about my car. . . ." But while his lover keeps telling him not to worry, her reassurances lead to the sexual encounter in the final verse and the intriguing reversal in the transitive verb that describes it. She's making love to him, which implies a sexual assertiveness (if not quite aggressiveness) that the narrator won't, or can't, claim for himself.

Biographer Mark Dillon compared the lyrical themes to "a musical equivalent of Rebel Without a Cause." In his book Sonic Alchemy, David Howard wrote that "Don't Worry Baby" was a "subtle harbinger for the growing dichotomy within the California Sound. While 'I Get Around' symbolized the sunshine ideal in all its carefree splendor, 'Don't Worry Baby' suggested something entirely more pensive and even slightly dark underneath its pristine facade."

== Composition ==
Musically, "Don't Worry Baby" is closely similar to "Be My Baby". Both songs start with a standalone drumbeat that is then joined by other instruments. The verses in "Don't Worry Baby" are in E major (the same key as "Be My Baby") and follow a I–IV–V chord progression. The chorus has the same changes as the verses of "Be My Baby" (I–ii–V), and both choruses have the same scale tones in the melody, albeit with a different rhythm.

One of the ways in which the song distinguishes itself from "Be My Baby" is through the use of a key change preceding the chorus. At the end of the verses, the song shifts from E to F♯ major by repeating a ii7–V sequence one whole step above. Musicologist Philip Lambert notes, "The key shift is a transcendent expression of the change in perspective, from the guy in the verse to the girl in the chorus."

== Recording ==
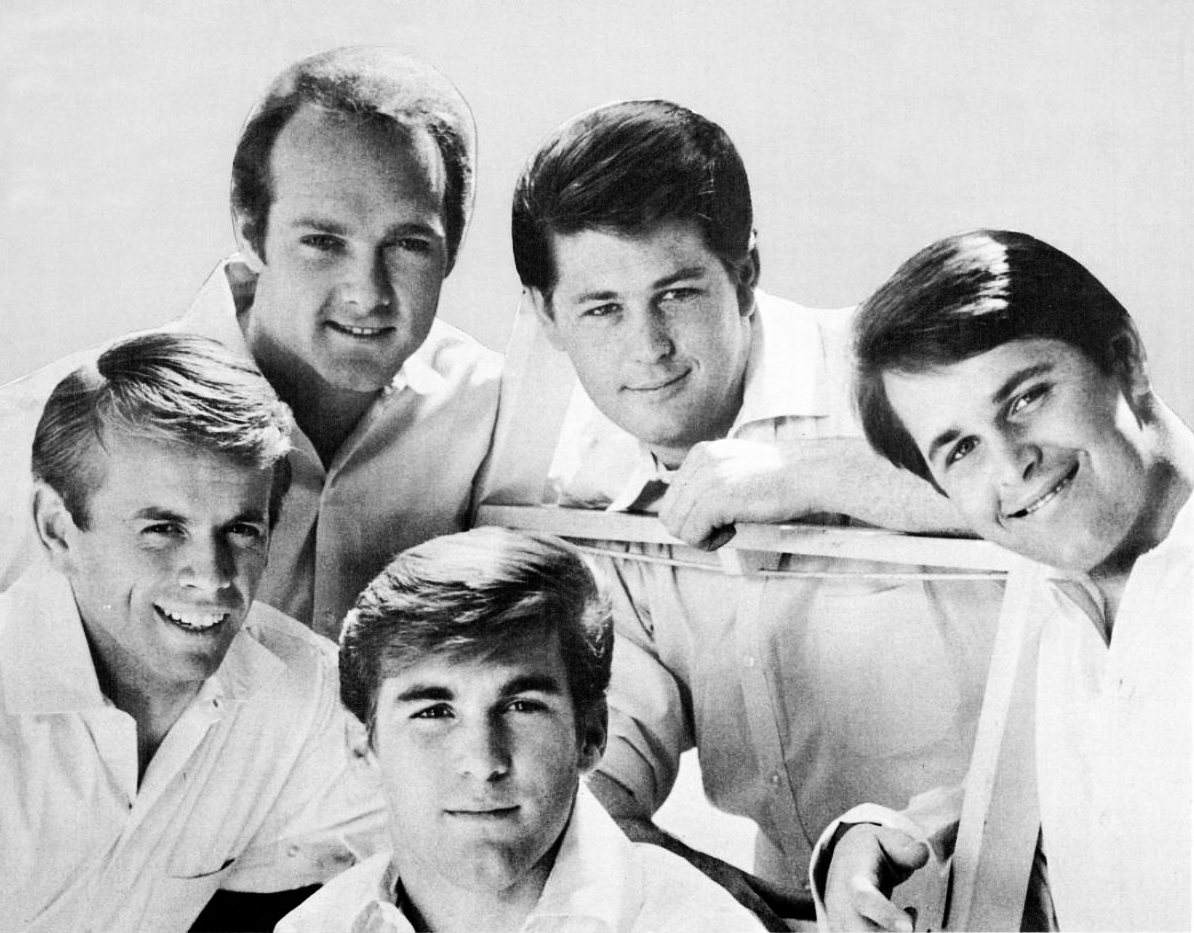
The Beach Boys at a 1964 photoshoot

The Beach Boys recorded "Don't Worry Baby" as part of two eight-hour sessions at United Western Recorders, Hollywood, on January 7, 1964. All of the band members played their own instruments on the recording. Vocals and guitars were overdubbed on January 8 or 9. Take 12 was used for the master. Former member David Marks, who had left the group several months earlier, played at this overdubbing session.

Commenting on Wilson's singing, Timothy White wrote, "Brian upped the vocal ceiling in his emulative arrangement to accommodate the Wagnerian Minnie Mouse yodel that was Ronette lead singer Ronnie Bennett's standard sonic slope." An alternate take of Wilson's singing was included on the 2013 box set Made in California.

Despite being modeled heavily after "Be My Baby", "Don't Worry Baby" does not emulate Phil Spector's Wall of Sound production technique.

== Release ==
Shut Down Volume 2 was released on March 2, 1964, with "Don't Worry Baby" placed as the second track. On March 14, the band appeared on American Bandstand, during which they lip synced a performance of "Don't Worry Baby". The segment was broadcast on ABC on April 18.

On May 11, "Don't Worry Baby" was issued as the B-side to their single "I Get Around". The B-side charted separately from the A-side due to differences in radio plays, peaking at number 24 on July 4. Cash Box described it as an "attention-getting shuffle beat cha cha" song that "has the big hit goods."

== Legacy and recognition ==
OK, so maybe the appeal of this one has nothing to do with the specifics of the story, but surely we can all relate to the idea of support, how knowing that someone cares for you regardless of what happens gives you strength to do great things. And the music is such a perfect accompaniment to this theme, so damn cozy and warm, a tender respite from the stressful reality of the main narrative.

— Pitchfork editor Mark Richardson

Biographer David Leaf declared that "Don't Worry Baby" became Wilson's first "pop standard", while Dillon decreed that it marked "one of his defining [vocal] performances on one of his greatest records." In a 1970 interview, Wilson opined, "Probably the best record we've done was 'Don't Worry Baby'. It has about the best proportion of our voices and ranges." Wilson has since called his vocal on the song the best he has done for the band, commenting, "I think I sang it sweetly enough that you could feel the love in my voice."

In 1988, "Don't Worry Baby" was ranked number 11 on Spin's list of the greatest singles in history. In 2010, it was ranked number 178 on Rolling Stone's list of the greatest songs in history. In 2010, it was ranked number 14 on Pitchfork's list of the greatest songs of the 1960s. Music critic Dave Marsh claimed that "Don't Worry Baby" alone "would make Wilson and the Beach Boys major figures in rock history."

The song was featured in the 1994 film My Girl 2, the 1999 film Never Been Kissed and the 2006 film Déjà Vu.

== Cover versions and homages ==
Terry Melcher drew heavily on "Don't Worry Baby" for his production and arrangement of the Byrds' 1965 rendition of "Mr. Tambourine Man". The two tracks share a similar tempo, as well as the same drum beat and rhythm guitar patterns. Byrds member Roger McGuinn greatly admired "Don't Worry Baby" and stated that, at one point, he listened to the record (alongside "God Only Knows") nearly every morning. "I'd wake up and play those songs. It was really inspirational. It was almost like going to church." Dillon writes that part of the Byrds' subsequent success "can be attributed to how they successfully adapted Beach Boys-style harmonies" on songs such as "Mr. Tambourine Man".

"Don't Worry Baby"

Single by B.J. Thomas

from the album B.J. Thomas
- B-side: "My Love"
- Released: June 1977
- Genre: Easy listening
- Length: 3:02
- Label: MCA
- Songwriters: Brian Wilson, Roger Christian
- Producer: Chris Christian

B.J. Thomas singles chronology
"Without a Doubt" (1977)	"Don't Worry Baby" (1977)	"Still the Lovin' Is Fun" (1977)

The song was Keith Moon's favorite Beach Boys track, and he recorded two versions of it for his only solo album, Two Sides of the Moon (1975). Another cover by the Bay City Rollers became a Top 40 hit in Australia. B. J. Thomas released "Don't Worry Baby" as a single in 1977, making it the most successful cover, and outperforming the sales of the Beach Boys' version. Thomas later said: "I have always loved the Beach Boys—all of their records. They could do no wrong in my book. Brian Wilson was amazing. It wasn't my biggest hit, but it did sell about 800,000 copies and I still perform it live in concert."

In the 1980s, Randy Bachman and Carl Wilson wrote an homage to "Don't Worry Baby", titled "What's Your Hurry, Darlin'?", that was recorded by Bachman's band Ironhorse. In 1988, the Beach Boys re-recorded the song featuring the Everly Brothers and released the song as a single. Lorrie Morgan was the featured guest on the Beach Boys' rerecording of "Don't Worry Baby" for the band's 1996 album Stars and Stripes Vol. 1. Garbage's 1998 single, "Push It", contained an interpolation of the "Don't Worry Baby" chorus; Wilson and Christian were subsequently given songwriting credits on "Push It".

New Zealand rock band Zed recorded a cover version in 2003 for their second studio album This Little Empire.

== Personnel ==
Per Craig Slowinski.

The Beach Boys

- Al Jardine – backing vocals, electric bass guitar
- Mike Love – backing vocals
- Brian Wilson – lead and backing vocals, piano, producer
- Carl Wilson – backing vocals, electric rhythm guitar
- Dennis Wilson – backing vocals, drums
- David Marks – electric rhythm guitar (overdubbed in solo)

Production staff

- Chuck Britz – engineer

Craig Slowinski has provided confirmation for the credits above, 11/21/2026.

== Charts ==
=== Weekly singles charts ===
The Beach Boys version
Chart (1964)	Peak position
U.S. Billboard Hot 100	24

The Bay City Rollers version
Chart (1976)	Peak position
Australia (Kent Music Report)	34

B.J. Thomas version
Chart (1977)	Peak position
Canada RPM Top Singles	12
Canada RPM Adult Contemporary	1
U.S. Billboard Hot 100	17
U.S. Billboard Adult Contemporary	2
U.S. Cash Box Top 100	13

Lorrie Morgan version
Chart (1996)	Peak position
U.S. Billboard Hot Country Songs	73

=== Year-end charts ===
B.J. Thomas version
Chart (1977)	Rank
Canada RPM Top Singles	118
U.S. Billboard Hot 100	96
U.S. Cash Box	83

== Certifications ==
The Beach Boys version
Region	Certification	Certified units/sales
New Zealand (RMNZ)	Gold	15,000^{‡}
United States (RIAA)	Platinum	1,000,000^{‡}
^{‡} Sales+streaming figures based on certification alone.

== Bibliography ==
- Badman, Keith (2004). The Beach Boys: The Definitive Diary of America's Greatest Band, on Stage and in the Studio. Backbeat Books. ISBN 978-0-87930-818-6.
- Carlin, Peter Ames (2006). Catch a Wave: The Rise, Fall, and Redemption of the Beach Boys' Brian Wilson. Rodale. ISBN 978-1-59486-320-2.
- Dillon, Mark (2012). Fifty Sides of the Beach Boys: The Songs That Tell Their Story. ECW Press. ISBN 978-1-77090-198-8.
- Howard, David N. (2004). Sonic Alchemy: Visionary Music Producers and Their Maverick Recordings. Hal Leonard Corporation. ISBN 978-0-634-05560-7.
- Lambert, Philip (2007). Inside the Music of Brian Wilson: The Songs, Sounds, and Influences of the Beach Boys' Founding Genius. Bloomsbury Publishing. ISBN 978-1-4411-0748-0.
- Lambert, Philip (2016). "Brian Wilson's Harmonic Language". In Lambert, Philip (ed.). Good Vibrations: Brian Wilson and the Beach Boys in Critical Perspective. University of Michigan Press. ISBN 978-0-472-11995-0.
- Leaf, David (1978). The Beach Boys and the California Myth. New York: Grosset & Dunlap. ISBN 978-0-448-14626-3.
- Rooksby, Rikky (2001). Inside Classic Rock Tracks: Songwriting and Recording Secrets of 100 Great Songs from 1960 to the Present Day (1st ed.). Backbeat Books. ISBN 9780879306540.
- Sanchez, Luis (2014). The Beach Boys' Smile. Bloomsbury Academic. ISBN 9781623562588.
- White, Timothy (1996). The Nearest Faraway Place: Brian Wilson, the Beach Boys, and the Southern Californian Experience. Macmillan. ISBN 0333649370.
- Wilson, Brian; Gold, Todd (1991). Wouldn't It Be Nice: My Own Story. New York: HarperCollins. ISBN 978-0-06018-313-4.
