= That's Why God Made the Radio (song) =

Single by The Beach Boys

from the album That's Why God Made the Radio
- B-side: "That's Why God Made the Radio" (Instrumental)
- Released: April 25, 2012
- Recorded: 2011–2012
- Genre: Soft rock
- Length: 3:19
- Label: Capitol
- Songwriters: Joe Thomas; Brian Wilson; Jim Peterik; Larry Millas
- Producer: Brian Wilson

The Beach Boys singles chronology
"Don't Fight the Sea" (2011)	"That's Why God Made the Radio" (2012)	"Isn't It Time" (2012)

Music video
- "That's Why God Made the Radio" on YouTube

"That's Why God Made the Radio" is a song written by Joe Thomas, Brian Wilson, Jim Peterik, and Larry Millas (Peterik and Millas are original members of The Ides Of March) for the American rock band The Beach Boys. It was the first new single from the band in 20 years and was included on the band's 29th studio album of the same name. The album was recorded to coincide with the band's 50th anniversary, which featured a reunion tour of the surviving co-founders. According to the song's co-writer Peterik:

[Brian and I] were at an Italian restaurant and we were talking about radio and how great songs used to sound through the AM radio coming through your oval speaker on your Plymouth Valiant and I said, "Man, that was the best sound of all," and Brian said, "Yeah, that's why God made the radio." Of course, I wrote that down. He didn't realize how brilliant it was, or maybe he did, but that's when we wrote that song.

== Commercial performance ==
"That's Why God Made the Radio" made its national radio debut April 25, 2012 on ESPN's Mike and Mike in the Morning. It was released to the band's YouTube channel later that same day, with accompanying lyrics. In addition, the song has been released and is now available as a single in digital outlets such as iTunes and Amazon.

== Reception ==
Rolling Stone named the song the 30th best song of 2012.

== Personnel ==
According to That's Why God Made the Radio album liner notes.

The Beach Boys

- Brian Wilson – vocals
- Mike Love – vocals
- Al Jardine – vocals
- Bruce Johnston – vocals
- David Marks – guitar

Additional musicians

- Jeffrey Foskett – vocals, acoustic guitar
- Tom Bukovac – guitar
- Nick Rowe – guitar
- Nick Walusko – guitar
- Chad Cromwell – drums
- Michael Rhodes – bass
- John Hobbs – piano
- Scott Bennett – organ
- Darian Sahanaja – vibes

== Chart positions ==
=== Weekly charts ===
Weekly chart performance for "That's Why God Made the Radio"
Chart (2012)	Peak position
Japan Hot 100 (Billboard)	12
US Adult Contemporary (Billboard)	30
US Hot Singles Sales (Billboard)	16

=== Year-end charts ===
Year-end chart performance for "That's Why God Made the Radio"
Chart (2012)	Position
Japan (Japan Hot 100)	74
