= Shut Down Volume 2 =

Studio album by the Beach Boys
- Released: March 2, 1964
- Recorded: January 1–10, February 19–20, 1964
- Studio: Western (Hollywood); Gold Star (Hollywood)
- Genre: Surf rock; Hot rod rock
- Length: 27:05
- Label: Capitol
- Producer: Brian Wilson

The Beach Boys chronology
Little Deuce Coupe (1963)	Shut Down Volume 2 (1964)	All Summer Long (1964)

The Beach Boys UK chronology
Surfin' Safari (1963)	Shut Down Volume 2 (1964)	The Beach Boys' Christmas Album (1964)

Singles from Shut Down Vol. 2
- 1. "Fun, Fun, Fun" b/w "Why Do Fools Fall in Love" Released: February 3, 1964

Professional ratings
Review scores
Source	Rating
AllMusic	3/5 stars
Blender	2/5 stars
Encyclopedia of Popular Music	4/5 stars
Record Mirror	4/5 stars
The Rolling Stone Album Guide	3/5 stars

Shut Down Volume 2 is the fifth album by the American rock band the Beach Boys, released March 2, 1964 on Capitol Records. Produced by Brian Wilson, it is the follow-up to the band's Little Deuce Coupe, released the previous October, and to Shut Down, a Capitol compilation album. Shut Down Volume 2 was the first of three studio albums that the band released in 1964 and the first without guitarist David Marks, who departed from the band following disagreements with manager Murry Wilson. The album reached number 13 in the US during a chart stay of 38 weeks and was eventually certified gold.

== Rediscovered master tapes ==
The multi-tracks for Shut Down Volume 2 went missing shortly after the album's release. In 2009, three reels of session outtakes were unexpectedly retrieved with the help of biographer Jon Stebbins, thanks to a fan who had found and kept the tapes untouched for years. New stereophonic mixes were created by producers Mark Linett and Alan Boyd for the compilation Summer Love Songs, which includes an alternate version of "Why Do Fools Fall in Love" featuring a never-before-heard unused intro section as well as a new stereo mix of "Don't Worry Baby".

With these reels, new stereo mixes of "Fun, Fun, Fun", "The Warmth of the Sun" and "Pom Pom Play Girl" were also created in 2013; the first two of these three appearing along with the aforementioned remixed songs on the Made in California box set, and all five remixes surfacing on the 2014 compilation Keep an Eye on Summer – The Beach Boys Sessions 1964, which featured select session highlights from these reels.

== Track listing ==
Side one
No.	Title	Writer(s)	Lead vocal(s)	Length
1.	"Fun, Fun, Fun"	Brian Wilson; Mike Love	Love	2:03
2.	"Don't Worry Baby"	B. Wilson; Roger Christian	B. Wilson	2:47
3.	"In the Parkin' Lot"	B. Wilson; Christian	Love	2:01
4.	" 'Cassius' Love vs. 'Sonny' Wilson"	Love; B. Wilson	group – comedy sketch	3:30
5.	"The Warmth of the Sun"	B. Wilson; Love	B. Wilson	2:51
6.	"This Car of Mine"	B. Wilson; Love	Dennis Wilson	1:35

Side two
No.	Title	Writer(s)	Lead vocal(s)	Length
7.	"Why Do Fools Fall in Love"	Frankie Lymon; George Goldner	B. Wilson	2:07
8.	"Pom, Pom Play Girl"	B. Wilson; Gary Usher	Carl Wilson; Love	1:30
9.	"Keep an Eye on Summer"	B. Wilson; Bob Norberg	B. Wilson; Love	2:21
10.	"Shut Down, Part II"	C. Wilson	instrumental	2:07
11.	"Louie, Louie"	Richard Berry	C. Wilson; Love	2:17
12.	"Denny's Drums"	D. Wilson	instrumental	1:56
Total length:				27:05

Surfer Girl / Shut Down Volume 2 1990/2001 CD reissue bonus tracks
No.	Title	Writer(s)	Lead vocal(s)	Length
13.	"Fun, Fun, Fun" (Single Version)	B. Wilson; Love	Love	2:21
14.	"In My Room" (German Version)	B. Wilson; Usher	B. Wilson	2:20
15.	"I Do"	B. Wilson; Christian	Love; B. Wilson	3:06
Total length:				34:52

== Personnel ==
Partial credits sourced from Craig Slowinski, includes all tracks except ""Cassius" Love vs. "Sonny" Wilson", "This Car of Mine", "Shut Down, Part II" and "Louie, Louie". Instrumental credits for "This Car of Mine" taken from Jon Stebbins. Track numbers in parentheses.

The Beach Boys

- Al Jardine – backing vocals (1–3, 5, 7–9), bass guitar (1–3, 6, 8–9), electric rhythm guitar (5)
- Mike Love – lead vocals (1, 3, 8–9, 11), backing vocals (1–3, 5, 7–9), tenor saxophone (8)
- Brian Wilson – lead vocals (2, 5, 7, 9), backing vocals (1–3, 5, 7–9), piano (1–3, 5–9), Hammond B-3 organ (1)
- Carl Wilson – lead vocals (8, 11), backing vocals (1–3, 5, 7–9), electric guitar (1–3, 5–6, 8–11)
- Dennis Wilson – lead vocals (6), backing vocals (1–3, 5, 7–9), drums (1–3, 5–6, 8–9, 12), floor tom (8)

Additional musicians

- Ray Pohlman – 6-string bass guitar (1), bass guitar (5, 7)
- Hal Blaine – drums (1, 7), tambourine (1), bell-tree (5), percussion (5), timpani (7)
- Steve Douglas – tenor saxophone (1, 5, 7)
- Jay Migliori – baritone saxophone (1, 5, 7)
- Leon Russell – piano (7), tack piano (7)
- Bill Pitman – archtop acoustic guitar (7)
- Tommy Tedesco – electric guitar (7)
- Jimmy Bond – double bass (7)
- Frank Capp – glockenspiel (7), temple blocks (7), castanets (7)
- Al De Lory – piano (7)
- Plas Johnson – tenor saxophone (7)

== Charts ==
Chart (1964)	Peak position
US Billboard Top LPs	13
