= Little Deuce Coupe (song) =

Single by the Beach Boys

from the album Surfer Girl and Little Deuce Coupe
- A-side: "Surfer Girl"
- Released: July 22, 1963
- Recorded: June 12, 1963
- Genre: Hot rod rock; car song; rock and roll
- Length: 1:38
- Label: Capitol
- Songwriters: Brian Wilson; Roger Christian
- Producer: Brian Wilson

The Beach Boys singles chronology
"Surfin' U.S.A." (1963)	"Little Deuce Coupe" (1963)	"Be True to Your School" (1963)

Licensed audio
- "Little Deuce Coupe" on YouTube

"Little Deuce Coupe" is a song written by Brian Wilson and Roger Christian. The song first appeared as the B-side to the Beach Boys' 1963 single "Surfer Girl". The car referred to is the 1932 Ford Model 18 (deuce being for the year). "Little Deuce Coupe" became the Beach Boys' highest charting B-side, peaking on September 28, 1963, at No. 15 on the Billboard Hot 100.

== Composition ==
The music was written by Brian Wilson with the lyric by local radio station DJ Roger Christian. Its main melody is a twelve-bar blues. The song typified the Beach Boys' car songs which along with surfing, glamorized the teenage 1960s Californian lifestyle later called the California Myth. It was released on the Surfer Girl album and then again as the title track of the album Little Deuce Coupe. A Christmas-themed spin-off, "Little Saint Nick", was released by the group as a single later in the year.

The car referred to is the Ford Model 18; the 1932 coupe model was referred to as a "deuce coupe".

Brian Wilson commented on the song in the liner notes of the 1990 CD re-release of the original Surfer Girl album: "We loved doing 'Little Deuce Coupe'. It was a good 'shuffle' rhythm, which was not like most of the rhythms of the records on the radio in those days. It had a bouncy feel to it. Like most of our records, it had a competitive lyric. This record was my favorite Beach Boys car song." According to author Jon Stebbins in his book The Lost Beach Boy, while the group was on tour in July 1963 Mike Love hit on the idea to use short instrumental segments of the song in the Beach Boys' live set as a way to introduce the bandmembers to the audience, starting with Dennis Wilson on drums, then adding David Marks (and later Al Jardine) on rhythm guitar, Carl Wilson on lead guitar, and finally Brian on the bass, before launching the song from the top.

== Reception ==
In July 1963 Cash Box described it as "a delightful shuffle rhythm rocker."

== Chart performance ==
"Little Deuce Coupe" became the Beach Boys' highest charting B-side, rising to No. 15 on the Billboard Hot 100 for the week of September 28, 1963. It spent 11 weeks on the chart. It also charted on Billboard's Hot R&B Singles chart, peaking at No. 28. In Canada it co-charted with "Surfer Girl", reaching No. 7, while "Surfer Girl" itself reached No. 3 a week later.

== Recording ==
The song was recorded at Western Studios on June 12, 1963, at the same recording session as "Surfer Girl". The two songs were the first songs recorded for the Beach Boys' third album, Surfer Girl. This was the first Beach Boys recording session where Brian Wilson served as the official producer, and also one of the last sessions before Al Jardine rejoined the band.

=== Personnel ===
The Beach Boys

- Mike Love – lead vocals
- David Marks – lead guitar
- Brian Wilson – piano, vocals
- Carl Wilson – bass guitar, vocals
- Dennis Wilson – drums, vocals

== Variations ==
- 1965 – Rerecorded in medley with "I Get Around", Beach Boys' Party!
- 1996 – Rerecorded with country music artist James House for Stars and Stripes Vol. 1. This version peaked at number 69 on the Billboard Hot Country Singles & Tracks chart.
- 2001 – Demo version, Hawthorne, CA.

=== Expanded Cultural Influence ===
- 1973 - Performed as Deuce_Coupe by Joffrey Ballet in Chicago with a number of other Beach Boys songs including "Little Deuce Coupe"

=== Live performances ===
The Beach Boys have released five live versions of "Little Deuce Coupe", on Beach Boys Concert, Good Timin': Live at Knebworth England 1980, Songs from Here & Back, as part of a medley on Endless Harmony Soundtrack and as part of a medley on Live – The 50th Anniversary Tour. Al Jardine included this song on his solo album Live in Las Vegas.

== Legacy ==
Frank Zappa was quoted in his autobiography The Real Frank Zappa Book, "One of the most exciting things that ever happened in the world of 'white-person music' was when the Beach Boys used the progression V-ii on "Little Deuce Coupe." An important step forward by going backward."

In the 2005 film War of the Worlds, directed by Steven Spielberg, Ray Ferrier (played by Tom Cruise) sings part of the song to his daughter (Dakota Fanning) as a lullaby when she is too afraid to sleep, because he doesn't know the lullabies she has heard from her mother (Miranda Otto). Ray's effort succeeds in getting his daughter to sleep.

== Certifications ==
Certifications for "Little Deuce Coupe"
Region	Certification	Certified units/sales
United States (RIAA)	Gold	500,000^{‡}
^{^} Shipments figures based on certification alone.^{‡} Sales+streaming figures based on certification alone.
