= The Warmth of the Sun =

Single by the Beach Boys

from the album Shut Down Volume 2
- A-side: "Dance, Dance, Dance"
- Released: October 26, 1964
- Recorded: January 1 and 8, 1964
- Studio: Western and Gold Star, Hollywood
- Genre: Pop; doo-wop
- Length: 2:51
- Label: Capitol
- Songwriter(s): Brian Wilson; Mike Love
- Producer(s): Brian Wilson

The Beach Boys singles chronology
"When I Grow Up (To Be a Man)" (1964)	"Dance, Dance, Dance" / "The Warmth of the Sun" (1964)	"The Man with All the Toys" (1964)

Licensed audio
- "The Warmth of the Sun" on YouTube

"The Warmth of the Sun" is a song written by Brian Wilson and Mike Love for the American rock band the Beach Boys. It was released on their 1964 album Shut Down Volume 2 and as the B-side of the "Dance, Dance, Dance" single, which charted at No. 8 in the U.S. and No. 24 in the UK. Brian Wilson produced the song, and the rest of the album.

== Composition ==
Wilson and Love began composing the song on November 22, 1963, the day of the assassination of President John F. Kennedy, although the two co-authors give different accounts of the timing and whether it was begun before or after the killing. The subsequent recording of the song was informed by the emotional shock felt by its authors in the wake of Kennedy's death.

According to Mike Love:

"The Warmth of the Sun" was started in the early morning hours of the same morning that President Kennedy was killed in Dallas. The melody was so haunting, sad, melancholy, that the only thing that I could think of lyrically was the loss of love, when interest slips and feelings aren't reciprocated…though I wanted to have a silver lining on that cumulus nimbus cloud so I wrote the lyrics from the perspective of, "Yes, things have changed and love is no longer there, but the memory of it lingers like the warmth of the sun." I think it's really impactful and memorable…one of my favorite songs from an emotional and personal point of view.

In his 2016 autobiography, I Am Brian Wilson, Wilson recalled that the song was written the day of the assassination, and in response to it:

When the shooting happened, everyone knew instantly. It was all over the TV and on every kind of news. I called Mike and he asked me if I wanted to write a song about it. I said sure. It seemed like something we had to think about, and songs were the way I thought about things. We drove over to my office and in a half hour we had "The Warmth of the Sun." We didn't think of it as a big song. It was a personal response. But it got bigger over time because of the history linked to it.

== Critical response ==
Cash Box described it as "an ultra-lovely, lazy paced ballad that the boys deliver in oh-so-smooth, ear-arresting fashion." Reviewing the song for AllMusic, Donald A. Guarisco stated, "The sublime balance of lush vocals and sensitive songwriting made 'The Warmth of the Sun' one of the Beach Boys' finest and most moving ballads." Brian Wilson pioneered the use of adventurous chord changes in pop—"The Warmth of the Sun"'s transitions from C to A-minor to E-flat, were unheard of in 1964.

== Personnel ==
Credits from Craig Slowinski.

The Beach Boys

- Al Jardine – backing vocals, rhythm guitar
- Mike Love – backing vocals
- Brian Wilson – lead and backing vocals, piano
- Carl Wilson – backing vocals, lead guitar (with tremolo)
- Dennis Wilson – backing vocals, drums

Additional musicians

- Ray Pohlman – bass guitar
- Hal Blaine – bell tree, clinking percussion
- Steve Douglas – tenor saxophone
- Jay Migliori – baritone saxophone

== Appearances ==
The song was featured on the soundtrack of the film Good Morning, Vietnam (1987).

Wilson also rerecorded the song for his second solo album, I Just Wasn't Made for These Times (1995).

Additionally, Willie Nelson performed a version of the song with lead vocals on Stars and Stripes Vol. 1 (1996).

The song also appears on the 2002 compilation album Classics Selected by Brian Wilson, a collection of Wilson's personal favorite Beach Boys songs at the time.
