= Jeffrey Foskett =

American musician (1956–2023)

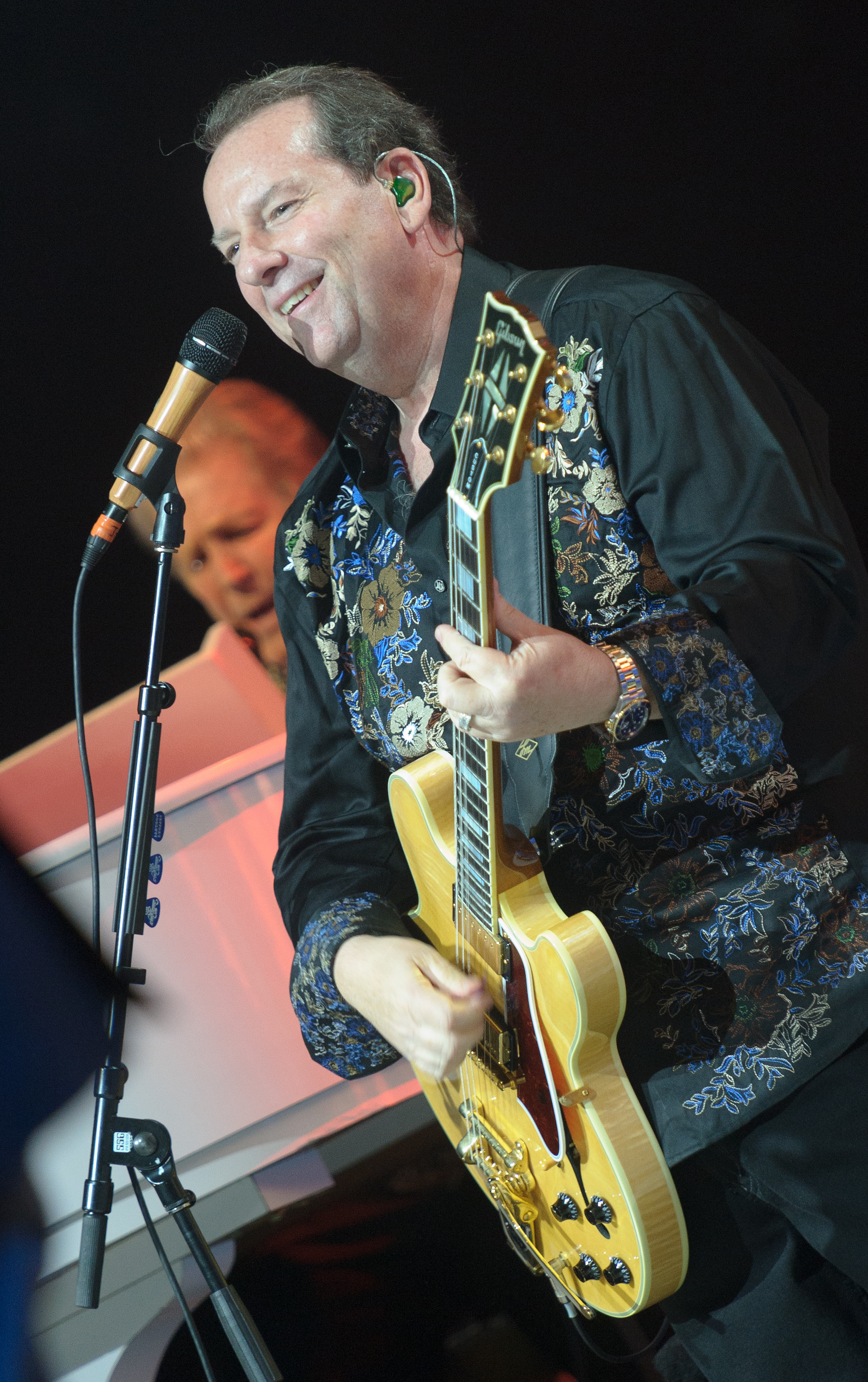
- Foskett in 2012

Background information
- Born: February 17, 1956; San Jose, California, U.S.
- Died: December 11, 2023 (aged 67)
- Genres: Rock, pop
- Occupations: Musician
- Instruments: Guitar; vocals
- Years active: 1970–2023
- Website: jeffreyfoskett.com

Jeffrey Foskett (February 17, 1956 – December 11, 2023) was an American guitarist and singer, notable as a touring and studio musician for Brian Wilson and the Beach Boys beginning in the 1980s. Foskett was described as the Beach Boys' "vice principal" by its touring members. In 1996, he debuted as a solo artist with the album Thru My Window and continued releasing albums until 2019.

== Early career ==
Born and raised in San Jose, California, Foskett began his first band in the 1970s known as Cherry, after the Willow Glen area street on which he lived. Foskett played mostly surf music covers in the same market as Papa Doo Run Run, with whom Foskett would join forces later. In the late 1970s, Foskett formed two renowned bands: the Reverie Rhythm Rockers (aka Reverie) and the Pranks while attending UCSB in Santa Barbara, California, gigging throughout the area with fellow area bands like D. B. Cooper. The band held a house residency at the famous Troubadour nightclub in Hollywood on Mondays, performing with the Mentors, the Cretones, the Police and 20/20.

== Working with Brian Wilson and the Beach Boys ==
Foskett became a fan of the Beach Boys after he heard "I Get Around" and became determined to meet Brian Wilson. In 1976, he tracked down Wilson's house in Bel Air, which had the stained-glass window used for the cover of the Beach Boys album Wild Honey. After knocking on Wilson's door, he was greeted by a friendly Wilson and quickly invited into his house as a guest. The two then kept in contact over the years.

In late 1979, Wilson's cousin Mike Love stopped by the Santa Barbara restaurant 1129, where Reverie was the house band. Love listened to Foskett and hired Reverie as the original incarnation of the Endless Summer Beach Band. The band toured with Love through December 1981, when Foskett replaced Brian's brother Carl Wilson, who briefly left the Beach Boys to pursue a solo career. When Carl rejoined the Beach Boys in May 1982, Foskett was asked to stay to perform his falsetto parts, which he did until 1990.

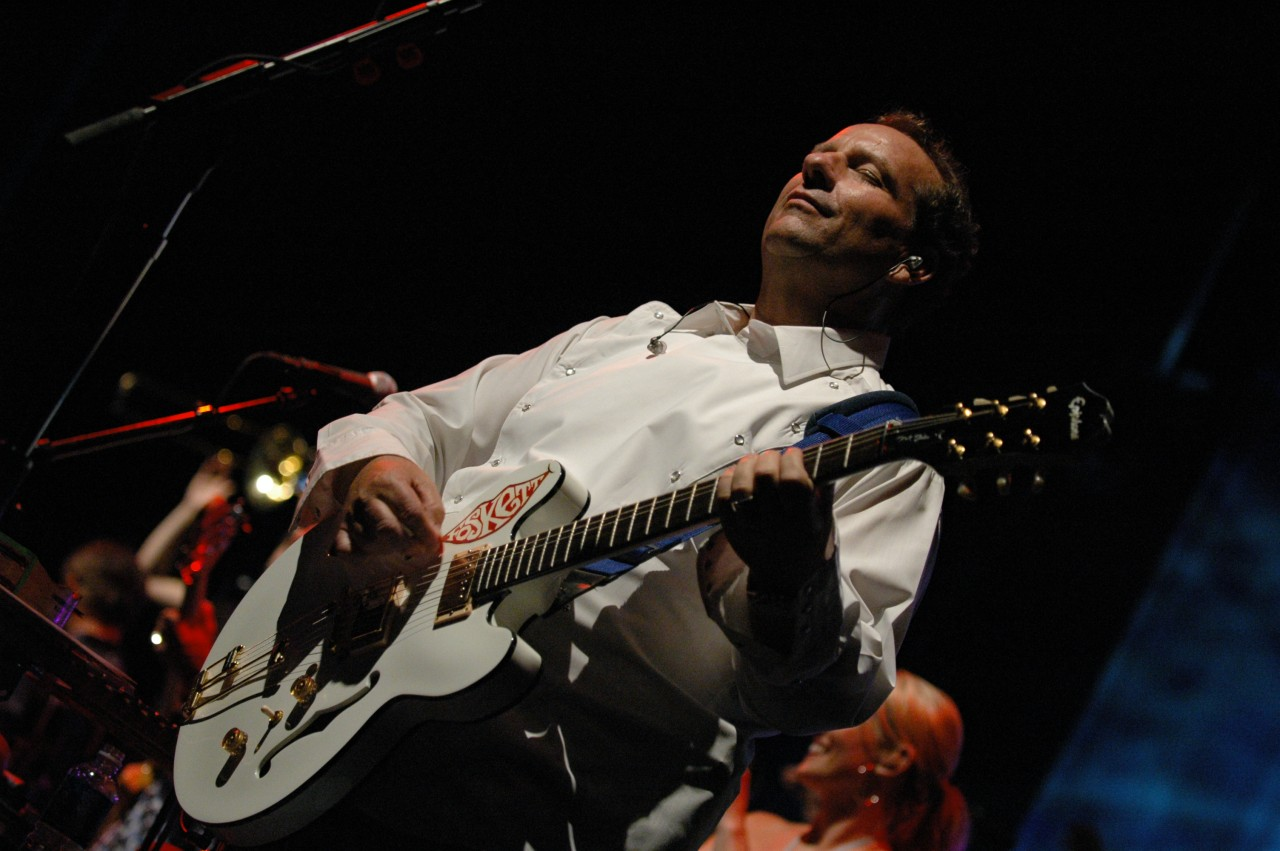
Foskett in 2006

When Brian Wilson returned to touring in the late 1990s, he asked Foskett to help him assemble his touring band. Foskett was the musical director, appearing at every solo show Brian had performed, up until he departed from Brian's band. In concerts, Foskett provided lead vocals on several of Brian's songs, including "Don't Worry Baby", "The Warmth of the Sun" and "Wouldn't It Be Nice" as well as others. Foskett has appeared as guitarist/vocalist/arranger on a majority of Brian's solo material, including his version of Smile.

In 2012, Foskett joined the Beach Boys' live band on The 50th Reunion Tour, and subsequently appeared on the studio album That's Why God Made the Radio alongside the band, performing all of the falsetto vocal parts as well as other vocals on the record. Regarding his role in the reunion, Al Jardine stated, "Jeffrey is invaluable to keeping the continuity between the various parts. He supports Brian in every possible way. He has Brian's confidence, and basically kind of makes it possible to have Brian Wilson on the road with us. [Without] that shoulder to lean on, I think it would be very difficult for Brian to tour. And I'm very grateful for that." On the tour he provided lead vocals on "Don't Worry Baby", "Wouldn't It Be Nice" and "Why Do Fools Fall In Love" as well as singing all of the falsetto vocals.

Following the reunion tour, Foskett resumed touring with Brian in 2013. Brian enlisted guitarist Jeff Beck to accompany him and Foskett on his tour and collaborate with him on his next album. Foskett left the touring band in late 2013, citing a sudden heavy workload on touring and recording the album. Foskett said, "After the Jeff Beck tour, I was completely stressed and burned out. That whole year, recording that album and that tour — because I knew Jeff so well — a lot of things fell on me to get done that normally would have been other people’s responsibilities. So, at the end of that tour, I kind of snapped — literally — and just said, 'I can't do this anymore'. However Brian views me, is alright with me, as long as he knows I love him." Foskett was replaced by Matt Jardine, who joined Brian along with his father and founding member Al Jardine on his tours.

On May 15, 2014, it was announced that Foskett would be re-joining the Beach Boys as a permanent member of the touring band. Foskett also performed on Love's solo albums Unleash the Love (2017) and Reason for the Season (2018).

In early 2019, Foskett took leave from the Beach Boys due to undergoing throat surgery. In late 2019, Foskett announced that he had been diagnosed with stage 4 anaplastic thyroid cancer in early 2018 and that his falsetto vocal range had heavily deteriorated as a result of several surgeries and treatments on his vocal cords. In addition, he said he would release his next album Voices, which he said may be his last album as a solo artist, on November 22, 2019, though added that he would also continue as a live musician and possibly explore doing record production work.

== Other work ==
Foskett released several solo albums including Thru My Window, touted as "The best Beach Boys album they never recorded", Cool and Gone, and Twelve and Twelve. Foskett won several awards including Top Selling Artist of the Year in New Zealand and Best New Foreign Artist in Japan. He is also a member of "California Rocks" the California Rock Hall of Fame.

In addition to the Beach Boys and Brian Wilson, Foskett toured and recorded with other friends in the music industry such as Paul McCartney, Jeff Beck, Roy Orbison, the Everly Brothers, Christopher Cross, Michael McDonald, Chicago, America, Heart, Roger McGuinn, Eric Carmen, Eric Clapton, Jimmy Page, and Ringo Starr. Foskett was among very few artists who recorded and performed live with three of the greatest guitarists, those being Beck, Page and Clapton. He also produced other artists including Harry Shearer of Spinal Tap and Micky Dolenz of the Monkees.

In 2016, Italia Guitars released their first Signature Model Guitar honoring Foskett named "The JF-12" twelve string guitar. In 2017, Italia released their second honorary model, "The JF-6" six string guitar. At the 2018 NAMM Show, Italia released their third honorary model, "The JF-Q" six string guitar.

On June 12, 2018, Foskett released the long in the works duet studio album with Jeff Larson entitled Elua Aloha. Foskett was also an avid supporter of The MD Anderson Cancer Center at the University of Texas, Houston, The Gary Sinise Foundation, and The Carl Wilson Foundation.

== Death ==
On December 11, 2023, Foskett died from anaplastic thyroid cancer at the age of 67. He was remembered as "a singer-guitarist that spent decades in the Beach Boys and played a pivotal role in Brian Wilson‘s late Nineties comeback thanks to his soaring falsetto and effortless ability to harmonize."

== Discography ==
Studio albums

- Thru My Window (1996)
- Sunny's Off (1996)
- Christmas At The Beach (1997)
- Cool and Gone (1997)
- Twelve and Twelve (1998)
- Elua Aloha (2018) (Jeffrey Foskett and Jeff Larson)
- Love Songs (2019)
- Vintage Summer (2019)
- Voices (2019)

Compilations

- The Other Takes (1996)
- Greatest Hits (1998)
- Tributes and Rarities (1999)
- Stars in the Sand (2000)
- Classic Harmony (2015)
- The Best of Jeffrey Foskett (2016)
- You Remind Me of the Sun (2017)
- Something There - Remembering Jeffrey Foskett (2025)
