= Do It Again (The Beach Boys song) =

Single by the Beach Boys
- B-side: "Wake the World"
- Released: July 8, 1968
- Recorded: May 26 – June 1968
- Studio: Beach Boys Studio, Los Angeles
- Genre: Rock
- Length: 2:19
- Label: Capitol
- Songwriters: Brian Wilson; Mike Love
- Producers: Brian Wilson; Carl Wilson

The Beach Boys singles chronology
"Friends" (1968)	"Do It Again" (1968)	"Bluebirds over the Mountain" (1968)

Audio sample
- file; help

"Do It Again" is a song by the American rock band the Beach Boys that was released as a standalone single on July 8, 1968. It was written by Brian Wilson and Mike Love as a self-conscious callback to the group's earlier surf image, which they had not embraced since 1964. Love and Wilson also share the lead vocal on the song.

The song was issued only two weeks after the release of the band's album Friends, with the album track "Wake the World" as its B-side. It reached number 20 on the United States' Billboard Hot 100 and became their second number-one hit in the United Kingdom. A slightly edited version of the song, using an excerpt from the Smile outtake "Workshop", subsequently appeared as the opening track on the Beach Boys' 1969 album 20/20.

"Do It Again" has been rerecorded once by the band (in 2011), once by Wilson as a solo artist (in 1995), and three times by Love as a solo artist (in 1996, 2016, and 2017). The song was an influence on Neil Sedaka's "Love Will Keep Us Together" (1973), Eric Carmen's "She Did It" (1977), Gary Numan's "Metal" (1979), ABBA's "On and on and On" (1980), and Hall & Oates' "Did It in a Minute" (1982).

== Background and recording ==
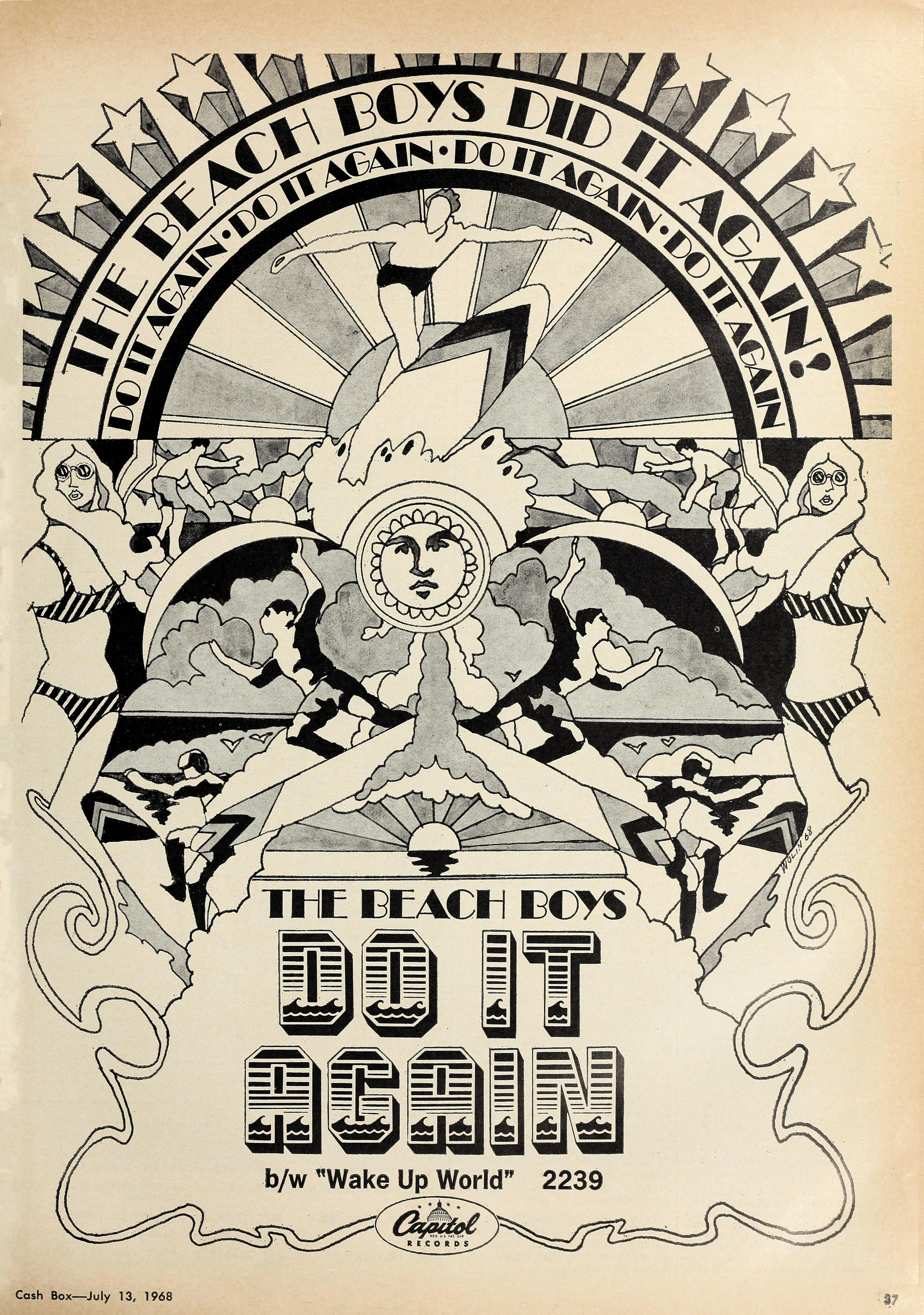
Cashbox advertisement, July 13, 1968

"Do It Again" is a self-conscious callback to the band's earlier surf-based material. Originally titled "Rendezvous", the lyrics to the song were inspired after a day Mike Love had spent at the beach in which he had gone surfing with an old friend named Bill Jackson. Love then showed the lyrics to his cousin Brian Wilson, who proceeded to write the music to Love's lyrics of nostalgia. Wilson stated that he believes the song was the best collaboration that he and Love ever worked on. Love commented, "He remembers it being at my house. I remember it as being at his house. He starts pounding at the piano, I was summoning up the words and we got a chorus together, which was basically a bunch of doo-wop inspired harmonies. We created that whole song in fifteen minutes." Other inspiration came from Hank Ballard's & The Midnighters 1960 song "Finger Poppin' Time". Carl Wilson recalled in Melody Maker:

Yes, I suppose it has got the old Beach Boys surfing sound. It's back to that surfing idea with the voice harmony and the simple, direct melody and lyrics. We didn't plan the record as a return to the surf or anything. We just did it one day round a piano in the studio. Brian had the idea and played it over to us. We improved on that and recorded it very quickly, in about five minutes. It's certainly not an old track of ours; in fact it was recorded only a few weeks before it was released. We liked how it turned out and decided to release it.

Conversely, Bruce Johnston told a reporter in September 1968 that he shared the reporter's underwhelming opinion of the song. "I don't like it either. I don't think that the group were entirely happy with it, but everyone else was going back to basics, so I suppose it was inevitable that we should."

During the mixdown, engineer Stephen Desper came up with the drum effect heard at the beginning of the track. He explained that he had "commissioned Philips, in Holland, to build two tape delay units for use on the road (to double live vocals). [He] moved four of the Philips PB heads very close together so that one drum strike was repeated four times about 10 milliseconds apart, and blended it with the original to give the effect you hear.".

== Promotional film ==
A promotional film, directed by Peter Clifton, was shot in Los Angeles. The film, shot in color, features the group pulling up in a van and visiting a surfing shop. The band members then drive to the beach in their van and begin surfing. The first screenings of the promotional film were shown on BBC One's Top of the Pops during broadcasts of the show on August 8, 22 and 29. In Germany, the promotional film was shown in September during broadcasts of the Hits A Go Go show on ZDF TV. The clip was later featured in the 1969 Peter Clifton Australian surfing film Fluid Journey. An alternate promotional film for "Do It Again" was planned with the idea to feature special guest, Beatles member Paul McCartney, as a clerk. However the idea was abandoned due to his busy schedule.

== Release ==
Released on July 19, 1968, in the United Kingdom, the single peaked at number one on the UK Singles Chart on August 28, 1968, 40 days after its release, and thus became the band's second number-one hit in the UK after "Good Vibrations" two years earlier. Love remembered thinking that the song's success in Britain "was unbelievable. It showed how many fans we had there and how attractive the whole California lifestyle is."

"Do It Again" remained at the top for only one week, after which it was supplanted by the Bee Gees' "I've Gotta Get a Message to You". When Friends was issued in Japan, "Do It Again" was included in its track list.

== Critical reception ==
In the US, Cash Box said: "Overtones of their current interest in electronic innovation are almost over-lookable in this surfin’ return by the Beach Boys" and that the song "couples their old summer sound with the ingenius production." Billboard said: "Much in the vein of the earlier Beach hits, this smooth rocker with a summertime smash sound should fast prove one of their all-time biggest hits. Record World said that "the Beach Boys go back to the beach for some of that unadulterated surfing sound '68."

In Britain's Disc & Music Echo, Penny Valentine praised the single:

This is a vast improvement on The Beach Boys' last single, and thank goodness for it. It sounds like bees humming on a summer breeze and is so completely solid; there isn't room for a fly to creep in. It goes on very gently and easily and is very, very pleasant. In a way it reminds me of one of the tracks off Pet Sounds, which is nice to say the least, and a hit it will most certainly be. I can imagine a few people will be muttering, "Well, she said they were finished," but I didn't. I said they should get back to their competent, commercial sound and they have. So there.

Retrospectively, "Do It Again" has been praised by music critics. Donald A. Guarisco, writing for AllMusic, described it as "doo-wop on steroids", and praised its "metallic" drum sound. In 2012, Mojo magazine named the song the 46th best by the band. The French edition of Rolling Stone ranked it 49th in a similar ranking of the band's greatest songs.

== Influence and legacy ==
Neil Sedaka borrowed the main riff from "Do It Again" for his own song "Love Will Keep Us Together," a hit for the Captain and Tennille. Eric Carmen credited the "did-its" in this song with being the initial inspiration for his 1977 Top 40 hit, "She Did It". Bruce Johnston of the Beach Boys also participated in the production and vocals of Carmen's song. "Did It in a Minute", a 1982 hit by Hall & Oates, was in turn inspired by the 'did-its' in both songs.

ABBA's "On and On and On" (1980) was also influenced by "Do It Again", and in response, Mike Love recorded a cover version of the ABBA song for his 1981 album Looking Back with Love. The opening drum line of "Do It Again" was sampled for "Remember" by French electronic duo Air on their album Moon Safari (1998).

"Do It Again" was featured in the films One Crazy Summer, Flipper, Life on the Longboard, and Happy Feet.

== Variations ==
=== Alternate studio versions ===
"Do It Again" was first released on an LP in 1969 for the band's 20/20 album. This version added a fade which consists of hammering and drilling sound effects originating from the Smile "Workshop" session recorded on November 29, 1966. The original Beach Boys recording was used to follow a 1966 take of "I Wanna Be Around" on The Smile Sessions (2011).

The song's backing track was released on the 1968 album Stack-O-Tracks. On the 1998 compilation album, Endless Harmony Soundtrack, an early incarnation of the song was released. Until 2013, the song was only available in mono because the studio multi-track tape was believed to have been stolen sometime in 1980. The tape was retrieved thirty years later; the first true stereo mix was released on the Made in California box set.

=== Live performances ===
The first officially released live recording of the song was released on the 1970 live album Live In London. Brian Wilson, who sings falsetto on the studio track, had retired from touring by this time and in concert his part was replaced by horns as evident on the Live In London album version. In 1980, a live rendition was recorded, though not released until 2002 on the Good Timin': Live at Knebworth England 1980 live album. Footage from the concert was also released on video and DVD format. The footage was also released on the 1998 documentary Endless Harmony with the sound re-mixed by Mark Linett into Dolby Digital 5.1 surround sound.

=== 2011 remake ===
In 2011 the surviving Beach Boys; Brian Wilson, Mike Love, Al Jardine, Bruce Johnston and David Marks came together in the studio to re-record "Do It Again" as part of their 50th anniversary celebration. The re-recorded version featured Mike Love (verses) and Brian Wilson (bridge) on lead vocals with longtime Beach Boys and Brian Wilson associate, Jeff Foskett, performing the falsetto vocals. It was released as a bonus track in special editions of That's Why God Made the Radio. "Do It Again" was the opening song performed at all Beach Boys 50th Reunion Tour concerts. Both Marks and Beach Boys sideman Scott Totten play guitar on the song; according to sideman John Cowsill, the original processed drum sound from 1968 was sampled for the re-recorded version. Other Beach Boys sidemen who play on the re-recording include Cowsill (drums), Darian Sahanaja, Nick Walusko (guitar), Scott Bennett, Gary Griffin, and Brett Simons (bass).

=== Solo versions ===
In 1995, Brian Wilson rerecorded the song for his album I Just Wasn't Made for These Times and released the track as a single in Britain, although it did not chart. The single also featured his rerecording of "'Til I Die", which was also from I Just Wasn't Made for These Times, and a rare B-side "This Song Wants to Sleep with You Tonight". He performed the song on the Late Night With David Letterman broadcast of August 17, 1995, with daughter Wendy Wilson performing back up vocals.

In 1996, Mike Love rerecorded "Do It Again". On July 4, 2017, Love remade and released the song again, this time with Mark McGrath, and released it as a single.

=== Compilation ===
In 1984, Capitol Records released a cassette-only Beach Boys compilation titled Do It Again which included the song. The cassette's cover—featuring band members against a blue background—was the visual inspiration for the cover of Weezer's first album, known as the Blue Album.

== Personnel ==
Credits from Craig Slowinski, and 20/20 liner notes.

The Beach Boys

- Al Jardine – backing vocals, electric rhythm guitar, handclaps
- Bruce Johnston – backing vocals, handclaps
- Mike Love – lead and backing vocals, handclaps
- Brian Wilson – backing vocals, piano, organ, producer; possible bass
- Carl Wilson – backing vocals, electric lead and rhythm guitars, producer; possible bass, possible tambourine
- Dennis Wilson – backing vocals, drums

Additional personnel

- Steve Desper – engineer
- John Guerin – drums, wood block; possible tambourine
- John Lowe – bass saxophone
- Ernie Small – baritone saxophone

== Cover versions ==
- 1969 – A Taste Of Honey and Ronnie Aldrich
- 1983 – Papa Doo Run Run
- 1985 – Twist
- 1987 – Wall of Voodoo, Happy Planet; the band also recorded a promotional film for the song which featured a guest appearance by Brian Wilson.
- 1994 – Trygve Thue
- 2000 – John Hunter Phillips, Diamonds On The Beach
- 2008 – Los Reactivos, Split Single (as "Hazlo Otra Vez")
- 2012 – Wilson Phillips, Dedicated
- 2017 – Mike Love (with Mark McGrath & John Stamos)
- 2022 – She & Him, Melt Away

== Charts ==
Weekly charts

Chart (1968)	Peak position
Australia (Go-Set)	3
Austrian Singles Chart	8
Canada RPM Top Singles	10
German Singles Chart	4
Ireland (IRMA)	5
Japan (All Japan Top 20 – Foreign)	4
Netherlands (Dutch Single Top 100)	3
New Zealand (Listener)	14
Norwegian Singles Chart	5
South Africa (Springbok)	7
Swiss Singles Chart	7
UK Singles Chart	1
US Billboard Hot 100	20
US Cash Box Top 100	8
US Record World	7

Year-end charts

Chart (1968)	Rank
Australia	20
United Kingdom	24
US Cash Box	81
