= Joe Thomas (producer) =

American record producer (1956–2024)

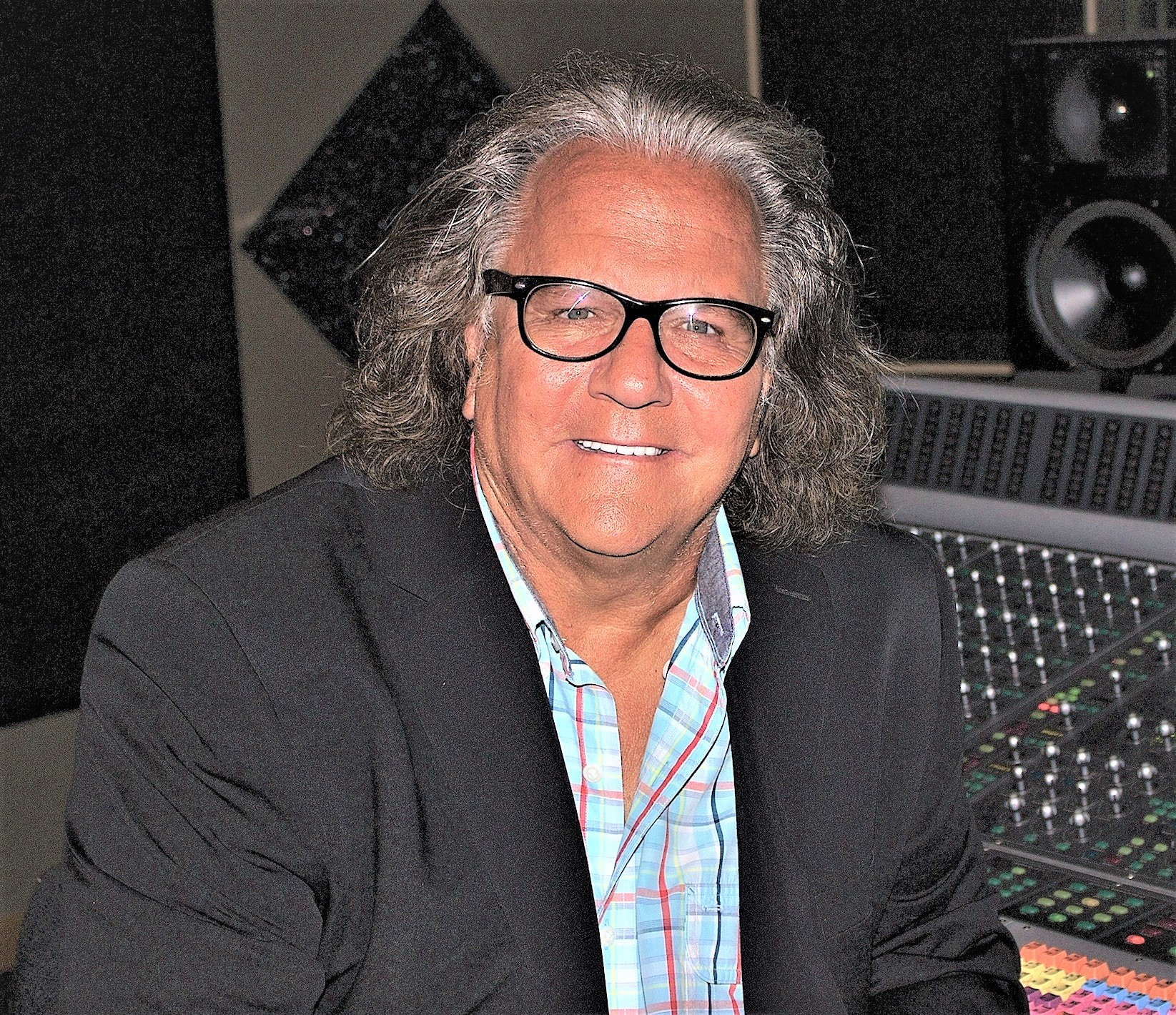
- Thomas, 2017
- Born: Joseph Grzyb; April 12, 1956; Illinois, U.S.
- Died: April 28, 2024 (aged 68); Illinois, U.S.
- Occupations: Producer, director, businessman, musician, songwriter
- Years active: 1984–2024
- Organizations: River North Records; River North Recorders; Kurtis HD Partners; HD Ready, LLC
- Known for: affiliation with Brian Wilson; work on the WTTW program Soundstage
- Spouse: Kris Thomas
- Children: 4

Joseph Thomas (born Joseph Grzyb, April 12, 1956 – April 28, 2024) was an American producer, businessman, multi-instrumentalist, and songwriter based in Illinois. He was known for musical collaborations and subsequent lawsuits pertaining to musician Brian Wilson, co-founder of the Beach Boys. Thomas was producer and director of the PBS music program Soundstage for WTTW.

== Early life ==
Thomas was born as Joseph Grzyb in Illinois on April 12, 1956, to Edward and Margaret Grzyb.

== Stars and Stripes Vol. 1 ==
In the mid 1990s, Thomas was enlisted to co-produce the Beach Boys' Stars and Stripes Vol. 1, an album consisting of country music stars covering Beach Boys songs. Beach Boy Mike Love says it was Thomas who suggested the idea of a country album, and it was released on River North Records, the label he had been running.

== Imagination and lawsuits ==
In 1997, Wilson commenced recording a new solo album with Thomas. Thomas also co-produced the track "Everything I Need" for The Wilsons, an album by Wilson's daughters. Session drummer Hal Blaine, who played on the recording, later said that Thomas ruined the song with excessive amounts of percussive flourishes, and that Wilson's daughters were unhappy with Thomas's contributions.

Biographer Peter Ames Carlin writes that the "slick sound of Joe's work—and the entree it might allow Brian into the adult contemporary market—was a large part of his appeal [to Wilson's camp]." The High Llamas' Sean O'Hagan believed: "I don't think Brian really wanted to work with him—but he had no choice, he was being pulled in that direction." In 1998, the magazine Uncut wrote: "Brian was being coerced away from [collaborator] Andy Paley (by wife Melinda, according to observers), toward Joe Thomas."

Imagination was released in June 1998. Wilson stated: "We call it a Brian Wilson album, but it's really a Joe Thomas/Brian Wilson album." Thomas purposely took it upon himself to ensure that the new work would sound as close to adult contemporary radio as possible. According to Carlin, many of Wilson's fans expressed their disappointment with the music being homogenized "to sound exactly like every other song on the radio."

In June 1998, Rolling Stone's Jason Fine reported: "Melinda says he's obligated to do another record with Thomas. ... As is often the case with Brian's career, Brian doesn't seem to be the one calling the shots. 'I'd like to stay here in L.A., but we built the studio, so I guess I have to go,' he says simply." Wilson soon filed a suit against Thomas, seeking damages and a declaration which freed him to work on his next album without involvement from Thomas. The suit was made after Thomas allegedly began to raise his industry profile and wrongfully enrich himself through his association with Wilson. Thomas reciprocated with a suit citing that Ledbetter "schemed against and manipulated" him and Brian. The case was settled out of court.

Thomas's AllMusic profile states: "The live DVD productions that were eventually released after the partnership of Wilson and Thomas went south are apparently studied in some recording classes as examples of how performers can be edited out of a production, specifically Thomas and his frequent collaborator Steve Dahl."

== Later Beach Boys productions ==
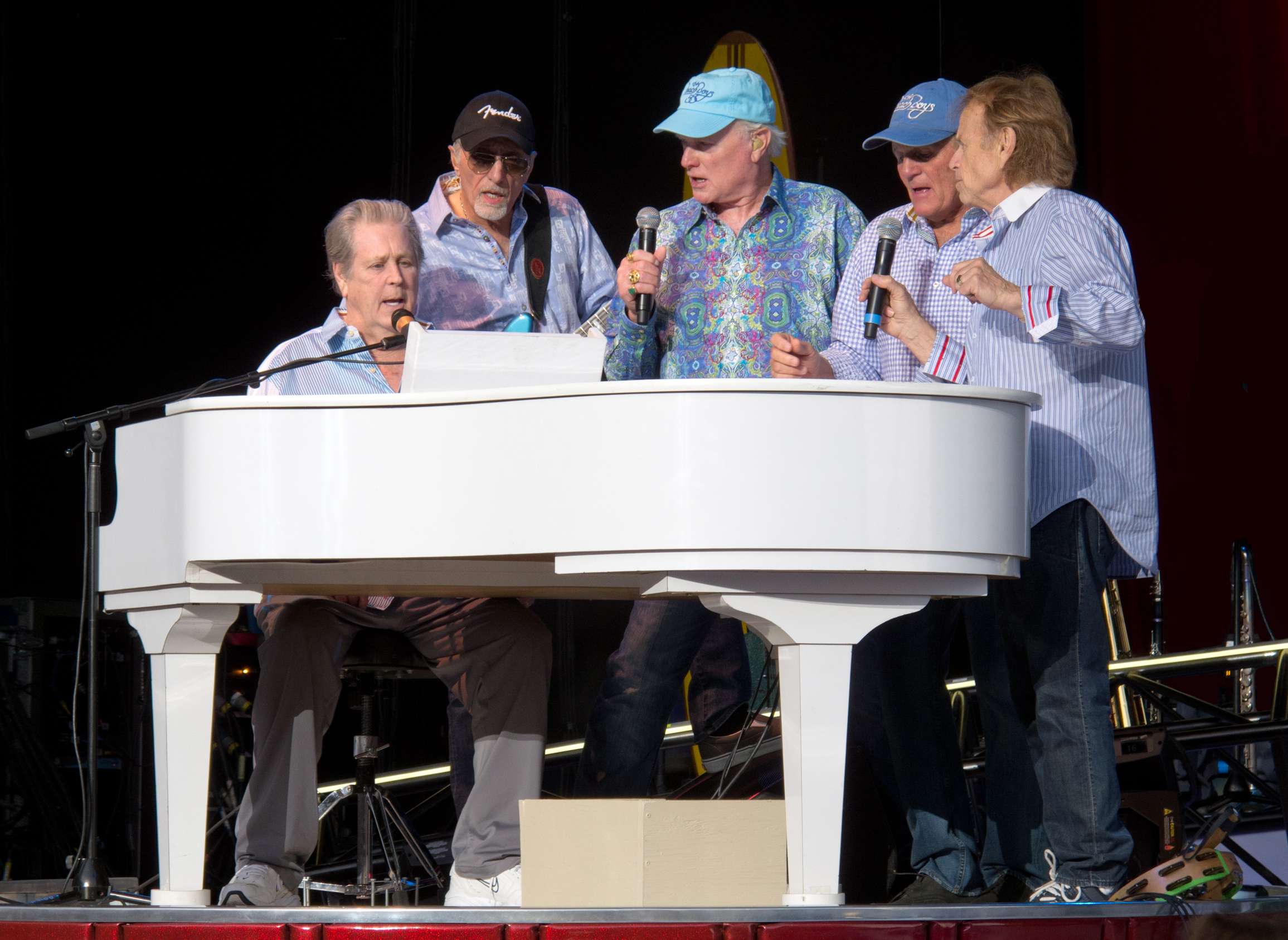
The reunited Beach Boys performing in May 2012

According to Thomas, around 2008 or 2010, Wilson inquired about demo tapes recorded during the sessions for Imagination. "He called up and said I've got some ideas for some new Beach Boys songs, and I said, That's great, and I pointed out to him that when we worked together several years ago he had the genesis of some other Beach Boy songs that he had never really wanted to put on any of his solo records." The two proceeded to meet with Mike Love in Palm Springs, who then agreed to a collaboration. The end product, titled That's Why God Made the Radio (2012), received generally favorable reviews.

In 2012, Thomas returned to co-produce the Beach Boys' Live – The 50th Anniversary Tour, which was widely criticized for its auto-tuned vocals. Thomas again co-produced Wilson's solo album No Pier Pressure (2015). The album garnered mixed reviews that widely referenced its adult contemporary arrangements and extensive use of auto-tune; Thomas was again held responsible for the album's particular sound.

== Personal life and death ==
Thomas was married to Kris, and the couple had four children. Thomas died on April 28, 2024, at the age of 68.

== Discography ==
Albums produced

- 1995: Ronna Reeves – After the Dance (River North)
- 1995: Holly Dunn – Life and Love and All the Stages (River North)
- 1996: The Beach Boys – Stars and Stripes Vol. 1 (MCA, River North)
- 1998: Brian Wilson – Imagination (Giant)
- 2005: Dave Matthews Band – Weekend on the Rocks (RCA)
- 2008: Stevie Nicks – The Soundstage Sessions (Reprise)
- 2012: The Beach Boys – That's Why God Made the Radio (Capitol)
- 2013: The Beach Boys – Live – The 50th Anniversary Tour (Capitol/UMG)
- 2015: Brian Wilson – No Pier Pressure (Capitol)
- 2022: Chicago – "Chicago XXXVIII: Born for This Moment" (BMG)
