= Surfer Girl (song) =

- Swedish picture sleeve

Single by the Beach Boys

from the album Surfer Girl
- B-side: "Little Deuce Coupe"
- Released: July 22, 1963
- Recorded: June 12, 1963
- Studio: Western, Hollywood
- Genre: California sound; doo-wop; sunshine pop
- Length: 2:26
- Label: Capitol
- Songwriter: Brian Wilson
- Producer: Brian Wilson

The Beach Boys singles chronology
"Surfin' U.S.A" (1963)	"Surfer Girl" (1963)	"Be True to Your School" (1963)

Audio sample
- file; help

"Surfer Girl" is a song by the American rock band the Beach Boys from their 1963 album Surfer Girl. Written and sung by Brian Wilson, it was released as a single, backed with "Little Deuce Coupe", on July 22, 1963. The single was the first Beach Boys record to have Brian Wilson officially credited as the producer.

== Background ==
Wilson frequently referred to "Surfer Girl" as his first original composition. However, his closest high school friends disputed this, recalling that Wilson had written numerous songs prior to "Surfer Girl". The lyrics were inspired by Judy Bowles, Wilson's first serious girlfriend, whom he had dated for three and a half years.

The song was based on a Dion and the Belmonts version of "When You Wish Upon a Star", which has the same AABA form. As a solo artist, Wilson later covered it for the tribute album In the Key of Disney (2011), saying, "We're doin' "When You Wish Upon a Star" for the new album. It kinda inspired "Surfer Girl.".

== Recording ==
The band first recorded the song at World Pacific Studios on February 8, 1962, at an early recording session. However, the recordings from that session, engineered by Hite Morgan, would not be released until 1969.

The version released in 1963 as a single and on the Surfer Girl album was recorded June 12, 1963.

The song is written in the key of D major, with a key change to E-flat major after the B section.

== Single release ==
The "Surfer Girl" single, backed with "Little Deuce Coupe", was released on Capitol Records in the United States on July 22, 1963. Cash Box described it as "a lilting soft beat-ballad charmer."

== Charts ==
Chart (1963)	Peak position
Canada (CHUM Chart)	3
New Zealand (Lever Hit Parade)	5
U.S. Billboard Hot 100	7
U.S. Billboard Hot R&B Singles	18

== Certifications ==
Certifications for "Surfer Girl"
Region	Certification	Certified units/sales
United States (RIAA)	Gold	500,000^{‡}
^{^} Shipments figures based on certification alone.^{‡} Sales+streaming figures based on certification alone.
