= Fun, Fun, Fun =

1964 single by the Beach Boys

- U.S. picture sleeve

Single by the Beach Boys

from the album Shut Down Volume 2
- B-side: "Why Do Fools Fall in Love"
- Released: February 3, 1964
- Recorded: January 1 and 8–9, 1964
- Studio: United Western Recorders, Hollywood
- Genre: Pop rock; surf vocal; power pop; car song
- Length: 2:16
- Label: Capitol
- Songwriters: Brian Wilson; Mike Love
- Producer: Brian Wilson

The Beach Boys singles chronology
"Little Saint Nick" (1963)	"Fun, Fun, Fun" (1964)	"I Get Around" (1964)

Audio sample
- file; help

"Fun, Fun, Fun" is a song by the American rock band the Beach Boys from their 1964 album Shut Down Volume 2. Written by Brian Wilson and Mike Love, it is one of their early songs that defined the idyllic pop aesthetic later dubbed the "California myth". It was released as a single in February, backed with "Why Do Fools Fall in Love", and reached number five in the U.S. charts.

== Lyrics and inspiration ==
The song was written by Brian Wilson and Mike Love. The lyrics are partly inspired by events from Dennis Wilson's life. Love stated that his lyrics were modeled after Chuck Berry's 1964 song "Nadine". Russ Titelman recalled that he visited Brian while he was working on the song, and that its original lyric was "Run, Run, Run".

The lyrics describe a teenage girl who deceives her father so she can go hot-rodding with his Ford Thunderbird. At the end, her father discovers her deception and takes the keys from her. Near the end of the song, the song's narrator suggests that the girl accompany him, so that they may "have fun, fun, fun" engaging in other activities, "now that Daddy took the T-Bird away."

According to Salt Lake City radio manager Bill "Daddy-O" Hesterman of KNAK, an early promoter of the Beach Boys who brought them to Utah for appearances and concerts, the song was inspired by an incident involving Shirley Johnson, the station owner's daughter. Johnson had borrowed her father's 1963 Thunderbird, which had a University of Utah parking sticker, ostensibly to go study at the University library. Instead, she went to Shore's Drive In, a hamburger shop on the corner of 33rd South and 27th East. When the deception came to light, her driving privileges were revoked. In 2007, Johnson told KSL News that she was complaining loudly about the incident at the radio station, where she worked as a part-time secretary, when the Beach Boys happened to be there for an interview. Hesterman said that Brian Wilson and Love, amused by the incident, jotted down the beginnings of the song as he took them to the airport that afternoon.

== Composition ==
The opening electric guitar introduction of the song was based on Berry's "Johnny B. Goode", and the track's punctuated drum fills were inspired by the work of Phil Spector. Musicologist Philip Lambert noted that the initial two phrases of the song are based on almost the same chord progression as the first two phrases of "Da Doo Ron Ron", and are melodically similar.

== Recording ==
The song was recorded on January 1, 1964, at United Western Recorders Studio 3. Vocals and additional overdubs followed on either January 8 or 9. An earlier session was cancelled by band manager Murry Wilson, as he had felt dissatisfied with the song. Brian rescheduled the session after discovering what happened.

The stereo and mono mixes stem from the same recording but have a significant difference: the fadeout on the stereo mix fades out early into the song's outro, with the instruments fading away before the vocals (and an overdubbed drum part). The mono mix, as heard on the 45 as well as mono copies of Shut Down Volume 2 has an extended outro.

== Release ==
The "Fun, Fun, Fun" single backed with "Why Do Fools Fall in Love" was released in the United States in February 1964. Cash Box described it as "a contagious steady rock beat" song with a "great teen arrangement." The single peaked at the number-five spot on the Billboard chart. In the United Kingdom, the single was released in March 1964 through Capitol Records, but failed to chart. In Australia, the single peaked at the number-six position, which was the band's highest charting single in Australia at that time. In West Germany, the single became their first single to chart in the country when it peaked at the number-49 position.

Whilst in Australia, Al Jardine claims he and Brian had a conversation criticising the release, saying they agreed it "didn't cut it" and "wasn't complete yet". The new single somewhat overlapped with the arrival of Beatlemania in the United States, and Jardine marks the release of "Fun, Fun, Fun" as a turning point which broadened the groups musical interpretation.

== Status Quo version ==
"Fun, Fun, Fun"

Single by Status Quo and the Beach Boys

from the album Don't Stop
- B-side: "Mortified"
- Released: February 19, 1996
- Length: 4:03 (album version); 3:05 (short version)
- Label: PolyGram TV
- Songwriters: Brian Wilson; Mike Love
- Producer: Pip Williams

Status Quo singles chronology
"When You Walk in the Room" (1995)	"Fun, Fun, Fun" (1996)	"Don't Stop" (1996)

The song was covered in 1996 by the then-current lineups of the Beach Boys and Status Quo, with a new verse written for the song. The Beach Boys sang mainly backing vocals, with Status Quo's Francis Rossi performing the lead vocal for the entire song, except the new verse, which was sung by Mike Love. It was released under PolyGram TV as a single in the United Kingdom, with Status Quo's "Mortified" on the B-side. This version peaked at number 24 on the UK Singles Chart.

== Personnel ==
Track details courtesy of session archivist Craig Slowinski.

The Beach Boys

- Al Jardine – harmony and backing vocal, bass guitar
- Mike Love – lead and bass vocal
- Brian Wilson – harmony and backing vocal, producer, piano, Hammond B3 organ
- Carl Wilson – harmony and backing vocal, lead and rhythm guitars
- Dennis Wilson – harmony and backing vocal, drums

Additional musicians

- Hal Blaine – tambourine, additional drums
- Steve Douglas – tenor saxophones
- Jay Migliori – baritone saxophones
- Ray Pohlman – 6-string electric bass guitars

== Charts ==
Beach Boys version
Chart (1964)	Peak position
Australian Singles Chart	6
Canada CHUM Chart	6
New Zealand (Lever Hit Parade)	8
US Billboard Hot 100	5
West Germany (GfK)	49

Status Quo version
Chart (1996)	Peak position
Europe (Eurochart Hot 100)	43
Germany (GfK)	81
Scottish Singles Sales (Official Charts)	21
UK Singles (Official Charts)	24

== Certifications ==
Certifications for "Fun, Fun, Fun"
Region	Certification	Certified units/sales
United States (RIAA)	Platinum	1,000,000^{‡}
^{^} Shipments figures based on certification alone.^{‡} Sales+streaming figures based on certification alone.

== In other medias ==
Fun, Fun, Fun is the name of a stand power in the 8th part of Jojo's Bizarre Adventure.
