= I Get Around =

1964 song by the Beach Boys

Single by the Beach Boys

from the album All Summer Long
- B-side: "Don't Worry Baby"
- Released: May 11, 1964
- Recorded: April 2–10, 1964
- Studio: Western, Hollywood
- Genre: Rock; doo-wop; surf; car song; California sound
- Length: 2:12
- Label: Capitol
- Songwriters: Brian Wilson; Mike Love
- Producer: Brian Wilson

The Beach Boys singles chronology
| "Fun, Fun, Fun" (1964) | "I Get Around" (1964) | "When I Grow Up (To Be a Man)" (1964) |

Audio sample
- file; help

"I Get Around" is a song by American rock band the Beach Boys and the opening track from their 1964 album All Summer Long. Written by Brian Wilson and Mike Love, the autobiographical lyrics describe the group's reaction to their newfound fame and success, as well as their restlessness concerning the status quo, and their desire to find new places "where the kids are hip". It was released as a single in May 1964, with the B-side "Don't Worry Baby".

One of America's biggest hits since the British Invasion, the single became the Beach Boys' first chart-topping hit in the U.S. and the beginning of an unofficial rivalry between Wilson and the Beatles. The single also topped the Canadian charts and reached the top ten in the UK, New Zealand, and Sweden. In 2017, "I Get Around" was inducted into the Grammy Hall of Fame.

== Background ==
"I Get Around" was written by Brian Wilson and Mike Love. Wilson was originally listed as the sole author of the song. After Love sued Wilson for songwriting credits in the 1990s, he was awarded official co-writing credits on 35 Beach Boys songs, including "I Get Around". Asked about the authorship of "I Get Around" during the court proceedings, Wilson responded, "I [wrote it], with the exception of a possible – possibility that Mike wrote the intro, the 'round 'round.'"

== Lyrics ==
Biographer Jon Stebbins states that the song was one of several that Wilson had based on the life experiences of his brother Dennis. Brian's original lyrics in the first verse had the line "Well there's a million little girls just waitin' around / But there's only so much to do in a little town / I get around from town to town". Love told Wilson that these were "pussy lyrics" and subsequently revised them. He later wrote

I tinkered with Brian's first verse, which was about this bored kid driving around but was really about our own experiences: how we had this instant fame, some fortune, had traveled all over the country, but did any of that bring us happiness? Maybe we needed to find a different kind of place.

In the first verse, the narrator expresses his boredom with "driving up and down the same old strip" and a need to "find a new place where the kids are hip". He takes notice of his and his "buddies" newfound fame, and the fact that even "bad guys" are familiar with them, although "they leave us alone". The phrase "I get around", declared in the choruses, is an expression that means the equivalent of "I know what's what". In the second and final verse, he boasts that he has the fastest car, and that he and his "buddies" are always successful at picking up women. Biographer Mark Dillon compared the lyrics to "the braggadocio of a modern-day rapper". Producer Daniel Lanois said of the song,

It's what I call a "snapshot song." It's like a Polaroid of a moment or a feeling. I like the way Brian wrote about specifics of a rising culture. He brings the listener in through one philosophical moment – one thought, one emotion – and that is often the most powerful way. You could write a much bigger song, but by writing a small one, you address a big subject. Funnily enough, Brian may not have been personally experiencing all those moments, but he was watching them happen.

== Composition ==
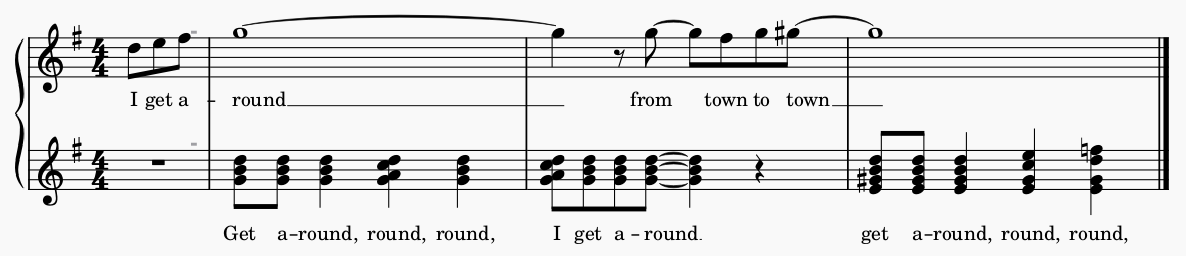
Transcription of the opening vocals in "I Get Around"

"I Get Around" begins in the key of G major with an a cappella intro section that contains a faster version of the chord progression used in the chorus: I–VI–ii–♭VII–V. Love stated that he had based the intro on the Regents' 1961 hit "Barbara-Ann", a song that the Beach Boys later covered on their 1965 album Beach Boys' Party!.

The verses alternate between ii and V, one of Wilson's favorite progressions, which he had previously used in "Little Deuce Coupe" and "Little Saint Nick". Noting the common theme between those songs and "I Get Around", musicologist Philip Lambert remarks, "Brian [had] quite literally updated the car song." Wilson cited the Chiffons' "One Fine Day" (1963) as another possible musical influence on "I Get Around".

During the instrumental solo, the key modulates to A major, which is then followed by a descent to A♭ major. Biographer Peter Ames Carlin distinguished the song for its "jarring rhythmic shifts, fuzz guitar, off-kilter organ riffs, and Brian's own wailing falsetto", while David Leaf called it "a major, revolutionary step in Brian's use of dynamics".

== Recording ==
Wilson produced the backing track with his bandmates and a selection of session musicians on April 2, 1964, at Western Studios in Hollywood. This date marked the beginning of the All Summer Long sessions. The group performed final overdubs for "I Get Around" eight days later, on April 10.

Murry Wilson, the band's publisher and the Wilson brothers' father, caused disruptions during the recording of the instrumental track. Biographer Steven Gaines writes, "Murry would not stop criticizing the song and Brian's production techniques ... rambl[ing] on about what a loser Brian was, how poor the music was, and how only Murry had the real talent in the family. At one point he insisted that Brian end the session because something was wrong with the bassline." Murry also scolded Dennis, who then punched a wall and left the session. Love remembered, "Brian had a hard time standing up to his father, but this time ... he shoved his dad, who went sprawling backward. That was the only time I ever saw Brian defy him physically, and Murry, defeated, left the studio."

According to some reports, the group then fired Murry as their manager. In Gaines' description, Brian had thrown his father against the wall and shouted, "Get out of here! You're fired! Do you understand? You're fired!" However, Love wrote in his 2016 memoir that Murry had already been dismissed as their manager "a couple months" before this incident.

== Release ==
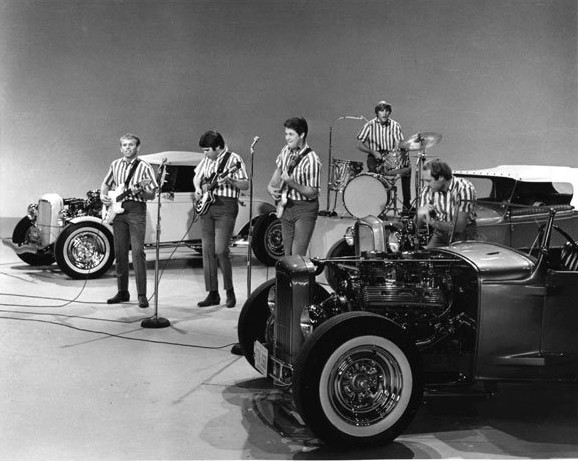
The Beach Boys performing "I Get Around" on The Ed Sullivan Show (September 27, 1964)

"I Get Around", backed with "Don't Worry Baby", was released as a single in the U.S. on May 11, 1964. Cash Box described it as an "exciting, tailored-for-teen- tastes hot rod stomp'er...that should be getting around at a quick clip."

On June 6, "I Get Around" debuted on the Billboard Top 40 chart at number 17. Four weeks later, on July 4, it overtook Peter and Gordon's "A World Without Love" to become the Beach Boys' first chart-topping U.S. hit. Coincidentally, this had occurred on the same day as America's annual Independence Day holiday. The single maintained the number-one position for two weeks.

According to author James Perone, "I Get Around" represented both a successful response by Wilson to the British Invasion, and the beginning of an unofficial rivalry between him and the Beatles, principally Paul McCartney. Lambert concurred, "As 'I Get Around' rose to the top of the charts ... the Beatles surely recognized that they had a formidable rival." In the UK, the single was released in June 1964 and reached number 7 on the Record Retailer chart – the band's first UK hit to breach the top ten. Rolling Stones frontman Mick Jagger gave the song a positive endorsement during an appearance on the British television program Ready Steady Go!.

On July 13, 1964, All Summer Long was released with "I Get Around" as the opening track. A recording of the group's August 1 performance of "I Get Around" at the Civil Memorial Auditorium in Sacramento, California was included on the live album Beach Boys Concert, released in October.

== Legacy and recognition ==
Rolling Stone critic Anthony DeCurtis referenced the song as an example of Wilson's ability to "be very complex and have every single thing you do have an emotional impact, and have the listener not even be aware of it—just hear it the first time and get it. That's hard." Stebbins writes of the song,

"I Get Around" is clearly ahead of its time, and it signals the speed at which Brian had developed. With its edgy guitar/sax bursts doubled with trebly reverbed Fender flicks, electric-organ fills, and an arrangement that stops, goes, accelerates, and then stops and goes a few more times, the song is nearly otherwordly in its inventiveness. Each band member's voice is showcased, and this helps to make this single as good as any pop record ever made.

In 2017, "I Get Around" was inducted into the Grammy Hall of Fame.

== Personnel ==
Per John Brode, Will Crerar, Joshilyn Hoisington, and Craig Slowinski.

The Beach Boys

- Al Jardine – harmony and backing vocals, bass guitars, handclaps
- Mike Love – verse lead, harmony, and backing vocals, handclaps
- Brian Wilson – chorus lead, harmony, and backing vocals, piano, harpsichord, Hammond organ, handclaps
- Carl Wilson – harmony and backing vocals, electric lead and rhythm guitars, handclaps
- Dennis Wilson – harmony and backing vocals, drums, handclaps

Session musicians (also known as "the Wrecking Crew")

- Hal Blaine – timbales with puili sticks
- Steve Douglas – tenor saxophone
- Jay Migliori – baritone saxophone
- Ray Pohlman – 6-string electric bass guitars

== Charts ==
=== Weekly charts ===
Weekly chart performance for "I Get Around"
| Chart (1964) | Peak position |
|---|---|
| Belgium (Ultratop 50 Wallonia) | 48 |
| Canada (CHUM Hit Parade) | 3 |
| Canada (RPM) | 1 |
| New Zealand (Lever Hit Parade) | 3 |
| UK Singles (Record Retailer) | 7 |
| US Billboard Hot 100 | 1 |
| West Germany (GfK) | 38 |

=== Year-end charts ===
Year-end chart performance for "I Get Around"
| Chart (1964) | Peak position |
|---|---|
| Canada (CHUM Hit Parade) | 46 |
| US Billboard Hot 100 | 5 |

== Certifications ==
Certifications for "I Get Around"
| Region | Certification | Certified units/sales |
|---|---|---|
| New Zealand (RMNZ) | Gold | 15,000^{‡} |
| United Kingdom (BPI) | Silver | 200,000^{‡} |
| United States (RIAA) | 2× Platinum | 2,000,000^{‡} |
^{^} Shipments figures based on certification alone.^{‡} Sales+streaming figures based on certification alone.

== Bibliography ==
- Badman, Keith (2004). The Beach Boys: The Definitive Diary of America's Greatest Band, on Stage and in the Studio. Backbeat Books. ISBN 978-0-87930-818-6.
- Carlin, Peter Ames (2006). Catch a Wave: The Rise, Fall, and Redemption of the Beach Boys' Brian Wilson. Rodale. ISBN 978-1-59486-320-2.
- Dillon, Mark (2012). Fifty Sides of the Beach Boys: The Songs That Tell Their Story. ECW Press. ISBN 978-1-77090-198-8.
- Gaines, Steven (1986). Heroes and Villains: The True Story of The Beach Boys. New York: Da Capo Press. ISBN 0306806479.
- Hoffmann, Frank W.; Bailey, William G. (1990). Arts & Entertainment Fads, Volume 1. Binghamton: Haworth Press. ISBN 9780866568814.
- Howard, David N. (2004). Sonic Alchemy: Visionary Music Producers and Their Maverick Recordings. Hal Leonard Corporation. ISBN 978-0-634-05560-7.
- Lambert, Philip (2007). Inside the Music of Brian Wilson: The Songs, Sounds, and Influences of the Beach Boys' Founding Genius. Bloomsbury Publishing. ISBN 978-1-4411-0748-0.
- Keightley, Keir (2016). "Summer of '64". In Lambert, Philip (ed.). Good Vibrations: Brian Wilson and the Beach Boys in Critical Perspective. University of Michigan Press. ISBN 978-0-472-11995-0.
- Lambert, Philip (2016). "Brian Wilson's Harmonic Language". In Lambert, Philip (ed.). Good Vibrations: Brian Wilson and the Beach Boys in Critical Perspective. University of Michigan Press. ISBN 978-0-472-11995-0.
- Love, Mike (2016). Good Vibrations: My Life as a Beach Boy. Penguin Publishing Group. ISBN 978-0-698-40886-9.
- Stebbins, Jon (2000). Dennis Wilson: The Real Beach Boy. ECW Press. ISBN 978-1-55022-404-7.
- White, Timothy (1996). The Nearest Faraway Place: Brian Wilson, the Beach Boys, and the Southern Californian Experience. Macmillan. ISBN 0333649370.
- Perone, James E. (2015). "The Beach Boys". In Moskowitz, David V. (ed.). The 100 Greatest Bands of All Time: A Guide to the Legends Who Rocked the World. ABC-CLIO. ISBN 978-1-4408-0340-6.
- Sellars, Jeff, ed. (2015). God Only Knows: Faith, Hope, Love, and The Beach Boys. Wipf and Stock Publishers. ISBN 978-1-4982-0767-6.
