= List of cover versions of Beach Boys songs =

Several notable music artists have recorded cover versions of The Beach Boys songs. The Beach Boys were a critically and commercially successful band whose music is defined as being culturally significant. Through their immense influence, many notable artists began covering their original songs while various commemorative tribute albums have been created. Some of them feature song selections based on a certain era, particular album, or other thematic choice.

Artists who have covered songs from the solo career of the Beach Boys' members are not included.

== Key ==
Denotes Beach Boys' related tribute albums or performances.
Denotes a recording with presence of one or more Beach Boys.
Denotes a single release that charted.

== List ==
Artist	Year	Song	Appearance	Note(s)
1910 Fruitgum Company	2007	"Little Saint Nick"	Bubblegum Christmas	
The A-Bones	1990	"Drive-In"	Smiles, Vibes & Harmony	
A Mighty Wind	2013	"God Only Knows"	BioShock Infinite	
Adventures in Stereo	1998	"Wonderful"	Smiling Pets	
Rick Altizer	2002	"Surf's Up"	Making God Smile	
The Aluminum Group	2000	"Caroline, No"	Caroline Now!	
American Spring	1972	"Darlin'" (as "Thinkin' Bout You Baby")	Spring	
American Spring	1972	"This Whole World"	Spring	
American Spring	1972	"Forever"	Spring	
Anamanaguchi	2023	"God Only Knows"	Scott Pilgrim Takes Off	
The Apples in Stereo	2001	"Heroes and Villains"	Let's Go!	
P. P. Arnold	1968	"God Only Knows"	Kafunta	
Avenged Sevenfold	2017	"God Only Knows"	The Stage (Evolving)	
Backstreet Boys	2007	"When I Grow Up (To Be a Man)"	Musicares Presents A Tribute to Brian Wilson	
Joshua Bassett and Matt Cornett	2020	"Little Saint Nick"	High School Musical: The Musical: The Holiday Special	
Jeff Beck	2007	"Surf's Up"	Musicares Presents A Tribute to Brian Wilson	
Jeff Beck	2007	"Surfin' U.S.A."	Musicares Presents A Tribute to Brian Wilson	
Best Coast	2017	"Little Saint Nick"	Amazon Music	
Frank Black	1993	"Hang on to Your Ego"	Frank Black	
Norman Blake	2000	"Only with You"	Caroline Now!	
David Bowie	1984	"God Only Knows"	Tonight	
Boys Choir of Harlem	2001	"Our Prayer"	An All-Star Tribute to Brian Wilson	
Brenda and the Tabulations	1967	"God Only Knows"	Dry Your Eyes	
Jonatha Brooke	2004	"God Only Knows"	Back in the Circus	
Junior Brown	1996	"409"	Stars and Stripes Vol. 1	
Sawyer Brown	1996	"I Get Around"	Stars and Stripes Vol. 1	
T. Graham Brown	1996	"Help Me, Rhonda"	Stars and Stripes Vol. 1	
Michael Bublé	2016	"God Only Knows"	Nobody but Me	
California Music	1974	"Don't Worry Baby"	single	
Glen Campbell	1977	"God Only Knows"	Southern Nights	
Kate Campbell	2002	"Add Some Music to Your Day"	Making God Smile	
Captain & Tennille	1974	"Disney Girls"	Love Will Keep Us Together	(Note: B-side of "The Way I Want to Touch You" (original release))
Captain & Tennille	1975	"God Only Knows"	Love Will Keep Us Together	
Captain & Tennille	1975	"Cuddle Up"	Love Will Keep Us Together	
Captain & Tennille	2007	"Little Saint Nick"	The Secret of Christmas	
Brandi Carlile	2016	"God Only Knows"	single	
Larry Carlton	1997	"I Just Wasn't Made for These Times"	Wouldn't It Be Nice: A Jazz Portrait of Brian Wilson	
Eric Carmen	2000	"Caroline, No"	I Was Born to Love You	
Carpenters	1973	"Fun, Fun, Fun"	Now & Then	
Aaron Carter	1998	"Surfin' U.S.A."	Surfin' USA	(Note: 1. 18, UK Top 100)
David Cassidy	1975	"Darlin'"	The Higher They Climb	(Note: 1. 16, UK Top 50)
Dori Caymmi	1997	"Caroline, No"	Wouldn't It Be Nice: A Jazz Portrait of Brian Wilson	
Ray Charles	1986	"Sail On, Sailor"	The Beach Boys 25 Years Together: A Celebration in Waikiki	
Alex Chilton	2000	"I Wanna Pick You Up"	Caroline Now!	
Alex Chilton	2013	"Wouldn't It Be Nice"	Electricity by Candlelight	
Alex Chilton	2013	"Surfer Girl"	Electricity by Candlelight	
Alex Chilton	2013	"Solar System"	Electricity by Candlelight	
Petula Clark	1964	"J'ai pas le temps"	single	(Note: French language rendition of "No-Go Showboat")
Holly Cole	2003	"God Only Knows"	Shade (Holly Cole album)	
Elvis Costello ft. the Brodsky String Quartet	1993	"God Only Knows"	The Juliet Letters	
The Cowsills	1969	"Good Vibrations"	The Cowsills in Concert	
Cub	1993	"Surfer Girl"	Betti-Cola	
Rivers Cuomo	2008	"Don't Worry Baby"	Alone II: The Home Recordings of Rivers Cuomo	
Rivers Cuomo	2011	"God Only Knows"		
Jamie Cullum	2007	"Sail On, Sailor"	Musicares Presents A Tribute to Brian Wilson	
The Cynics	1990	"Be True to Your School"	Smiles, Vibes & Harmony	
Dale Earnhardt Jr. Jr.	2011	"God Only Knows"	Horse Power	
Darlin'	1995	"Darlin'"		
Das Damen	1990	"Johnny Carson"	Smiles, Vibes & Harmony	
Paul Davis	1977	"Darlin'"/ duet with Susan Collins	Singer of Songs - Teller of Tales	(Note: 1. 51, Billboard Hot 100 (1978))
Descendents	1986	"Wendy"	Enjoy!	
Neil Diamond	1977	"God Only Knows"	I'm Glad You're Here with Me Tonight	
Dino, Desi & Billy	1965	"Fun, Fun, Fun"	Our Time's Coming	
Dino, Desi & Billy	1966	"Girl Don't Tell Me"	Memories Are Made of This	
DM3	1998	"Caroline, No"	Smiling Pets	
Dolour	2002	"This Whole World"	Making God Smile	
Doopees	1995	"Caroline, No"	Doopee Time	
Dos Dragsters (Sea Foam Green)	1990	"Pet Sounds"	Smiles, Vibes & Harmony	
Dr. Teeth and the Electric Mayhem	1979	"Little Saint Nick"	John Denver and the Muppets: A Christmas Together	
Dr. Teeth and the Electric Mayhem	2023	"God Only Knows"	The Muppets Mayhem	
Earth, Wind & Fire	2007	"Don't Talk (Put Your Head on My Shoulder)"	Musicares Presents A Tribute to Brian Wilson	
Kat Edmonson	2012	"I Just Wasn't Made for These Times"	Way Down Low	
Elements	1997	"'Til I Die"	Wouldn't It Be Nice: A Jazz Portrait of Brian Wilson	
Eliane Elias	1997	"Our Sweet Love/Friends"	Wouldn't It Be Nice: A Jazz Portrait of Brian Wilson	
Cass Elliot	1972	"Disney Girls"	Cass Elliot	
Evan and Jaron	2001	"I Get Around"	An All-Star Tribute to Brian Wilson	
Betty Everett	1975	"God Only Knows"	Happy Endings	
Jad Fair	2000	"Do Ya"	Caroline Now!	
Feelds	1998	"I Just Wasn't Made for These Times"	Smiling Pets	
Ferron	1999	"Don't Worry Baby"	Inside Out: The IMA Sessions	
Bryan Ferry	1973	"Don't Worry Baby"	These Foolish Things	
The Flaming Lips	2012	"God Only Knows"	MOJO Presents Pet Sounds Revisited	
Fleetwood Mac	1980	"Farmer's Daughter"	Live	
FORMS	1998	"Heroes and Villains"	Smiling Pets	
The Free Design	2000	"Endless Harmony"	Caroline Now!	
French Frith Kaiser Thompson	1987	"Surfin' U.S.A."	Live, Love, Larf & Loaf	
Kim Fowley	2000	"Almost Summer"	Caroline Now!	
Glenn Frey	2012	"Caroline, No"	After Hours	
Bill Frisell	2014	"Surfer Girl"	Guitar in the Space Age!	
Charly Garcia y Pedro Aznar	1991	"God Only Knows"	Tango 4	
Art Garfunkel	1975	"Disney Girls"	Breakaway	
David Garland	1993	"I Went to Sleep"	I Guess I Just Wasn't Made for These Times	
David Garland	1993	"I Just Wasn't Made for These Times"	I Guess I Just Wasn't Made for These Times	
David Garland	1993	"In My Room"	I Guess I Just Wasn't Made for These Times	
David Garland	1993	"Cabinessence"	I Guess I Just Wasn't Made for These Times	
David Garland	1993	"In the Back of My Mind"	I Guess I Just Wasn't Made for These Times	
David Garland	1993	"Fall Breaks and Back to Winter (W. Woodpecker Symphony)"	I Guess I Just Wasn't Made for These Times	
David Garland	1993	"I Wanna Pick You Up"	I Guess I Just Wasn't Made for These Times	
David Garland	1993	"You're So Good to Me"	I Guess I Just Wasn't Made for These Times	
David Garland	1993	"Don't Talk (Put Your Head on My Shoulder)"	I Guess I Just Wasn't Made for These Times	
David Garland	1993	"Mt. Vernon and Fairway - Theme"	I Guess I Just Wasn't Made for These Times	
David Garland	1993	"Wonderful"	I Guess I Just Wasn't Made for These Times	
David Garland	1993	"'Til I Die"	I Guess I Just Wasn't Made for These Times	
David Garland	1993	"Meant for You"	I Guess I Just Wasn't Made for These Times	
Leif Garrett	1977	"Surfin' U.S.A."	Leif Garrett	(Note: 1. 20, Billboard Hot 100)
Leif Garrett	1977	"California Girls"	Leif Garrett	
Renée Geyer	1994	"God Only Knows"	Difficult Woman	
Vince Gill	2001	"The Warmth of the Sun"	An All-Star Tribute to Brian Wilson	
Vince Gill, Jimmy Webb, & David Crosby	2001	"Surf's Up"	An All-Star Tribute to Brian Wilson	
Grant Lee Buffalo	1995	"In My Room"	Friends (Original TV soundtrack)	
David Grubbs	1998	"Wind Chimes"	Smiling Pets	
Keith Green	1965	"Girl Don't Tell Me"	single	
Don Grusin	1997	"Surfer Girl"	Wouldn't It Be Nice: A Jazz Portrait of Brian Wilson	
Handsome Dick Manitoba	1990	"Dance, Dance, Dance"	Smiles, Vibes & Harmony	
Hanson	1997	"Little Saint Nick"	Snowed In	
Harpy	1998	"Cool, Cool Water"	Smiling Pets	
Jason Harrod	2002	"In My Room"	Making God Smile	
Justin Hayward	1989	"God Only Knows"	Classic Blue	
Joey Heatherton	1972	"God Only Knows"	The Joey Heatherton Album	
The High Llamas	2000	"Anna Lee, the Healer"	Caroline Now!	
The Hollyridge Strings	1965	"Little Saint Nick"	Christmas Favorites	
The Hondells	1964	"Little Honda"	Go Little Honda	(Note: 1. 9, Billboard Hot 100)
The Hot Doggers	1963	"Surfin' U.S.A."	Surfin' U.S.A.	
The Hot Doggers	1963	"Surfin'"	Surfin' U.S.A.	
The Hot Doggers	1963	"Surfin' Safari"	Surfin' U.S.A.	
James House	1996	"Little Deuce Coupe"	Stars and Stripes Vol. 1	
Mari Iijima	1989	"Little Saint Nick"	The Christmas Song	
Stevie Jackson	2000	"Good Time"	Caroline Now	
Jim James	2017	"I Just Wasn't Made for These Times"	Tribute to 2	
Jan and Dean	1963	"Surfin'"	Jan & Dean Take Linda Surfin	
Jan and Dean	1963	"Surfin' Safari"	Jan & Dean Take Linda Surfin	
Jan and Dean	1963	"Little Deuce Coupe"	Drag City	
Jan and Dean	1965	"Little Honda"	Command Performance	
Jan and Dean	1965	"I Get Around"	Command Performance	
Jan and Dean	1971	"Vegetables"	Jan & Dean Anthology	
Jan and Dean	1982	"Shut Down"	One Summer Night/Live	
Jan and Dean	1982	"Surfin' U.S.A."	One Summer Night/Live	
Jan and Dean	1982	"Dance, Dance, Dance"	One Summer Night/Live	
Jan and Dean	1982	"Help Me, Rhonda"	One Summer Night/Live	
Jan and Dean	1982	"California Girls"	One Summer Night/Live	
Jan and Dean	1982	"Good Vibrations"	One Summer Night/Live	
Jan and Dean	1982	"Fun, Fun, Fun"	One Summer Night/Live	
Jan and Dean	1985	"Be True to Your School"	Silver Summer	
Jan and Dean	1985	"Surfer Girl"	Silver Summer	
Jan and Dean	2001	"California Saga: California"	Live in Concert: Surf City	
The Jesus & Mary Chain	1988	"Surfin' U.S.A."	Barbed Wire Kisses	
Joan Jett	1986	"Fun, Fun, Fun"	Good Music (Joan Jett and the Blackhearts album)	
Billy Joel	2001	"Don't Worry Baby"	An All-Star Tribute to Brian Wilson	
Elton John	2001	"God Only Knows"	An All-Star Tribute to Brian Wilson	
Elton John and Brian Wilson	2001	"Wouldn't It Be Nice"	An All-Star Tribute to Brian Wilson	
Daniel Johnston	2006	"God Only Knows"	Do It Again: A Tribute to Pet Sounds	
Tsuyoshi Kawakami	2003	"Pet Sounds"	Moodmakers Mood	
Jack Jones	1977	"Disney Girls"	The Full Life	
Jack Jones	1977	"God Only Knows"	The Full Life	
Phil Keaggy	2002	"Good Vibrations"	Making God Smile	
Toby Keith	1996	"Be True to Your School"	Stars and Stripes Vol. 1	
Eugene Kelly	2000	"Lady"	Caroline Now!	
Steven Khan & Gabriela Anders	1997	"Don't Worry Baby"	Wouldn't It Be Nice: A Jazz Portrait of Brian Wilson	
Jan Krist	2002	"Wouldn't It Be Nice"	Making God Smile	
The Langley Schools Music Project	2001	"Good Vibrations"	The Langley Schools Music Project	
The Langley Schools Music Project	2001	"God Only Knows"	The Langley Schools Music Project	
The Langley Schools Music Project	2001	"In My Room"	The Langley Schools Music Project	
The Langley Schools Music Project	2001	"I Get Around"	The Langley Schools Music Project	
The Langley Schools Music Project	2001	"Help Me, Rhonda"	The Langley Schools Music Project	
The Langley Schools Music Project	2001	"You're So Good to Me"	The Langley Schools Music Project	
The Langley Schools Music Project	2001	"Little Deuce Coupe"	The Langley Schools Music Project	
John Legend	2007	"I Just Wasn't Made for These Times"	Musicares Presents A Tribute to Brian Wilson	
Frank Lenz & Richard Swift	2002	"Caroline, No"	Making God Smile	
Peggy Lipton	1970	"I Just Wasn't Made for These Times"	single	
Charles Lloyd	2010	"Caroline, No"	Mirror	
Charles Lloyd	2013	"God Only Knows"	Hagar's Song	
Los Lobos	2021	"Sail On, Sailor"	Native Sons	
The Lost Dogs	2002	"With Me Tonight"	Making God Smile	
Darlene Love	2007	"Wouldn't It Be Nice"	Musicares Presents A Tribute to Brian Wilson	
Lulu	2002	"Sail On, Sailor"/ duet with Sting	Together	
Shelby Lynne	2007	"Surfer Girl"	Musicares Presents A Tribute to Brian Wilson	
Kirsty MacColl	1981	"You Still Believe in Me"	single	
Kirsty MacColl	1991	"Don't Go Near the Water"	single	
Phil Madeira	2002	"Heroes and Villains"	Making God Smile	
Melissa Manchester	1977	"The Warmth of the Sun"	Singin'...	
The Manhattan Transfer	1995	"God Only Knows"	Tonin'	
Aimee Mann and Michael Penn	2001	"I Just Wasn't Made for These Times"	An All-Star Tribute to Brian Wilson	
Ricky Martin	2001	"California Girls"	An All-Star Tribute to Brian Wilson	
Ricky Martin	2001	"Help Me, Rhonda"	An All-Star Tribute to Brian Wilson	
Kevin Max and Jimmy Abegg	2002	"Help Me, Rhonda"	Making God Smile	
Carmen McRae	1967	"Don't Talk"	For Once in My Life	
Carmen McRae	1967	"I Just Wasn't Made for These Times"	For Once in My Life	
Michael McDonald & Billy Preston	2007	"Don't Worry Baby"	Musicares Presents A Tribute to Brian Wilson	
John McEntire	1998	"Let's Go Away for Awhile"	Smiling Pets	
McFly	2004	"Little Saint Nick"	Eastenders Christmas Party	
Me First and the Gimme Gimmes	1992	"Sloop John B"	Blow in the Wind	
Medicine	2001	"'Til I Die"	Never Click	
Melt Banana	1998	"Surfin' U.S.A."	Smiling Pets	
Melt Banana	1998	"You're Welcome"	Smiling Pets	
Vince Mendoza ft. John Abercrombie	1997	"Don't Talk (Put Your Head On My Shoulder)"	Wouldn't It Be Nice: A Jazz Portrait of Brian Wilson	
the Melvins	2021	"I Get Around" (retitled: "I F*ck Around", with alt lyrics).	Working with God	
Jody Miller	1965	"In My Room"	Home of the Brave	
Kate Miner	2002	"God Only Knows"	Caroline Now!	
Katrina Mitchell & Bill Wells	2000	"Wind Chimes"	Caroline Now!	
M.O.D.	1988	"Surfin' U.S.A."	Surfin' M.O.D.	
Mandy Moore	2004	"God Only Knows"		
Thurston Moore	1998	"Here Today"	Smiling Pets	
The Mooseheart Faith	1990	"Wind Chimes"	Smiles, Vibes & Harmony	
Lorrie Morgan	1996	"Don't Worry Baby"	Stars and Stripes Vol. 1	(Note: 1. 73, Billboard Hot Country Songs)
Litto Nebbia	2002	"Surfer Girl"	Tributo Brian Wilson	
Litto Nebbia	2002	"Caroline No"	Tributo Brian Wilson	
Litto Nebbia	2002	"Please Let Me Wonder"	Tributo Brian Wilson	
Litto Nebbia	2002	"The Warmth of the Sun"	Tributo Brian Wilson	
Litto Nebbia	2002	"Til I Die"	Tributo Brian Wilson	
Litto Nebbia	2002	"God Only Knows"	Tributo Brian Wilson	
Litto Nebbia	2002	"Let Him Run Wild"	Tributo Brian Wilson	
Litto Nebbia	2002	"Wonderful"	Tributo Brian Wilson	
Litto Nebbia	2002	"Don't Talk (Put Your Head on My Shoulder)"	Tributo Brian Wilson	
Litto Nebbia	2002	"Girl Don't Tell Me"	Tributo Brian Wilson	
Willie Nelson	1996	"The Warmth of the Sun"	Stars and Stripes Vol. 1	
Olivia Newton-John	1974	"God Only Knows"	Long Live Love	
Jim O'Rourke	1998	"Fall Breaks and Back to Winter (W. Woodpecker Symphony)"	Smiling Pets	
Oberhofer	2010	"Be True to Your School"	Live: Big Ugly Yellow Couch Session	
The Olivia Tremor Control	1998	"Do You Like Worms?"	Smiling Pets	
The Olivia Tremor Control	1998	"Little Pad"	Smiling Pets	(Note: as "The Ships")
OnoTetsu	1998	"Tones"	Smiling Pets	
Roy Orbison	1969	"Help Me Rhonda"	The Big O	
The Original Sins	1990	"Help Me, Rhonda"	Smiles, Vibes & Harmony	
Overboard	2008	"Little Saint Nick"	Tidings	
Paper Dolls	1968	"Darlin'"		
Peanut	1966	"I'm Waiting for the Day"		
The Pearlfishers	2000	"Go Away Boy"	Caroline Now!	
Pennywise	1996	"Surfin' USA"	MOM: Music for Our Mother Ocean	
Pennywise	1997	"I Get Around"	MOM II: Music for Our Mother Ocean	
Pentatonix	2019	"God Only Knows"	The Best of Pentatonix Christmas	
Peter Thomas Sound Orchestra	2000	"Pet Sounds"	Caroline Now!	
Louis Philippe	1988	"Little Pad"		
Louis Philippe	1991	"I Just Wasn't Made for These Times"	Rainfall	
Pizzicato Five	1996	"Passing By"	Sister Freedom Tapes	
Players Pole Position	1989	"Good Vibrations"	Players Pole Position Vol. 2 - Surfin' U.S.A.	
Players Pole Position	1989	"Kokomo"	Players Pole Position Vol. 2 - Surfin' U.S.A.	
Players Pole Position	1989	"Dance, Dance, Dance"	Players Pole Position Vol. 2 - Surfin' U.S.A.	
Players Pole Position	1989	"Surfin' USA"	Players Pole Position Vol. 2 - Surfin' U.S.A.	
Players Pole Position	1989	"Don't Worry Baby"	Players Pole Position Vol. 2 - Surfin' U.S.A.	
Players Pole Position	1989	"Surfer Girl"	Players Pole Position Vol. 2 - Surfin' U.S.A.	
Players Pole Position	1989	"Fun, Fun, Fun"	Players Pole Position Vol. 2 - Surfin' U.S.A.	
Players Pole Position	1989	"I Get Around"	Players Pole Position Vol. 2 - Surfin' U.S.A.	
Players Pole Position	1989	"Do You Wanna Dance?"	Players Pole Position Vol. 2 - Surfin' U.S.A.	
Doug Powell	2002	"'Til I Die"	Making God Smile	
P. J. Proby	1965	"Don't Worry Baby"	I Am P. J. Proby	
Psychic TV	1986	"Good Vibrations"		
The Queers	1995	"Hawaii"	Move Back Home	
The Queers	1996	"Don't Back Down"	Don't Back Down	
The Queers	1996	"Little Honda"	Don't Back Down	
The Queers	1999	"God Only Knows"	Later Days and Better Lays (Hidden track)	
The Queers	2021	"Be True to Your School	Reverberation	
CJ Ramone	2018	"Surfer Girl"	split 7-inch with the Manges	
The Ramones	1993	"Surfin' Safari"	Acid Eaters (Japan version).	
Collin Raye	1996	"Sloop John B"	Stars and Stripes Vol. 1	
The Records	1990	"Darlin'"	Smiles, Vibes & Harmony	
Red Hot Chili Peppers	2007	"I Get Around"	Musicares Presents A Tribute to Brian Wilson	
Johnny Rivers	1975	"Help Me Rhonda"	New Lovers And Old Friends	(Note: 1. 38, Billboard Easy Listening; #22 Billboard Hot 100)
Rockabye Baby!	2006	"Surfer Girl"	Rockabye Baby! Lullaby Renditions of the Beach Boys	
Rockabye Baby!	2006	"In My Room"	Rockabye Baby! Lullaby Renditions of the Beach Boys	
Rockabye Baby!	2006	"Surf's Up"	Rockabye Baby! Lullaby Renditions of the Beach Boys	
Rockabye Baby!	2006	"Let's Go Away for Awhile"	Rockabye Baby! Lullaby Renditions of the Beach Boys	
Rockabye Baby!	2006	"Our Prayer"	Rockabye Baby! Lullaby Renditions of the Beach Boys	
Rockabye Baby!	2006	"The Warmth of the Sun"	Rockabye Baby! Lullaby Renditions of the Beach Boys	
Rockabye Baby!	2006	"Caroline, No"	Rockabye Baby! Lullaby Renditions of the Beach Boys	
Rockabye Baby!	2006	"God Only Knows"	Rockabye Baby! Lullaby Renditions of the Beach Boys	
Rockabye Baby!	2006	"Don't Talk (Put Your Head on My Shoulder)"	Rockabye Baby! Lullaby Renditions of the Beach Boys	
Rockabye Baby!	2006	"You Still Believe in Me"	Rockabye Baby! Lullaby Renditions of the Beach Boys	
Rockabye Baby!	2006	"Wouldn't It Be Nice"	Rockabye Baby! Lullaby Renditions of the Beach Boys	
The Rock-afire Explosion	1980	Catch a Wave	Classic Collection	
The Rock-afire Explosion	1983	Good Vibrations	Crazy Colander Head Night	
The Rock-afire Explosion	1983	Barbara Ann	Crazy Colander Head Night	
The Rock-afire Explosion	1986	Palisades Park	Tribute to the Circus	
The Rock-afire Explosion	1987	Little Saint Nick	Homely For Christmas	
Linda Ronstadt	1993	"Don't Talk (Put Your Head on My Shoulder)"	Winter Light	
David Lee Roth	1985	"California Girls"	Crazy from the Heat	(Note: 1. 3, Billboard Hot 100)
Darius Rucker & Matthew Sweet	2001	"Sail On, Sailor"	An All-Star Tribute to Brian Wilson	
Todd Rundgren	1976	"Good Vibrations"	Faithful	(Note: 1. 34, Billboard Hot 100)
Saint Etienne	2000	"Stevie"	Caroline Now!	
Saint Etienne	2012	"Wouldn't It Be Nice"	MOJO Presents Pet Sounds Revisited	
Leo Sayer	1983	"Darlin'"	Have You Ever Been in Love	
Scary Pockets, feat. Pomplamoose and Nataly Dawn	2021	"God Only Knows"	single	
Chris Schlarb	2013	"'Til I Die"	Psychic Temple II	
Timothy B. Schmit	1996	"Caroline, No"	Stars and Stripes Vol. 1	
Marilyn Scott	1977	"God Only Knows"	single	(Note: 1. 61, Billboard Hot 100)
Marilyn Scott	1997	"In My Room"	Wouldn't It Be Nice: A Jazz Portrait of Brian Wilson	
Seagull Screaming Kiss Her Kiss Her	1998	"You Still Believe In Me"	Smiling Pets	
Secret Chiefs 3	1998	"Good Vibrations"	Smiling Pets	
The Secret Goldfish	2000	"California Saga: Big Sur"	Caroline Now!	
Sharky's Machine	1990	"I Wanna Pick You Up"	Smiles, Vibes & Harmony	
She & Him	2011	"Christmas Day"	A Very She & Him Christmas	
She & Him	2011	"Little Saint Nick"	A Very She & Him Christmas	
She & Him	2022	"'Til I Die"	Melt Away: A Tribute to Brian Wilson	
She & Him	2022	"Darlin'"	Melt Away: A Tribute to Brian Wilson	
She & Him	2022	"Deirdre"	Melt Away: A Tribute to Brian Wilson	
She & Him	2022	"Do It Again"	Melt Away: A Tribute to Brian Wilson	
She & Him	2022	"Don't Talk (Put Your Head on My Shoulder)"	Melt Away: A Tribute to Brian Wilson	
She & Him	2022	"Don't Worry Baby"	Melt Away: A Tribute to Brian Wilson	
She & Him	2022	"God Only Knows"	Melt Away: A Tribute to Brian Wilson	
She & Him	2022	"Good to My Baby"	Melt Away: A Tribute to Brian Wilson	
She & Him	2022	"Heads You Win-Tails I Lose"	Melt Away: A Tribute to Brian Wilson	
She & Him	2022	"Kiss Me Baby"	Melt Away: A Tribute to Brian Wilson	
She & Him	2022	"Meant For You"	Melt Away: A Tribute to Brian Wilson	
She & Him	2022	"Please Let Me Wonder"	Melt Away: A Tribute to Brian Wilson	
She & Him	2022	"This Whole World"	Melt Away: A Tribute to Brian Wilson	
She & Him	2022	"Wouldn't It Be Nice"	Melt Away: A Tribute to Brian Wilson	
Shonen Knife	1996	"Don't Hurt My Little Sister"	The Birds & the B-Sides	
Short Hair Front	1998	"I'm Waiting for the Day"	Smiling Pets	
Carly Simon, David Crosby, and Jimmy Webb	2001	"In My Room"	An All-Star Tribute to Brian Wilson	
Paul Simon	2001	"Surfer Girl"	An All-Star Tribute to Brian Wilson	
Nancy Sinatra	2002	"California Girls"	California Girl	(Note: recorded 1970: backing vocals by Brian Wilson recorded in 2001)
Sixpence None the Richer	2002	"I Just Wasn't Made for These Times"	Making God Smile	
Sonic Youth	1990	"I Know There's an Answer"	Smiles, Vibes & Harmony	
Souvenir	2000	"Ne Dis Pas" ("Girl Don't Tell Me")	Caroline Now!	
Ronnie Spector	1999	"Don't Worry Baby"	She Talks to Rainbows	
Sports Guitar	1998	"Wonderful"	Smiling Pets	
Aaron Sprinkle	2002	"I Know There's an Answer" / ("Hang on to Your Ego")	Making God Smile	
Peter Stampfel & the Bottle Caps	1990	"Gonna Hustle You"	Smiles, Vibes & Harmony	
Status Quo	1996	"Fun, Fun, Fun"	Don't Stop	
Duglas T. Stewart	2000	"Lines"	Caroline Now!	
Michael Stipe	2004	"God Only Knows"		
Joss Stone	2005	"God Only Knows"	Mind Body & Soul	
Randy Stonehill	2002	"Love and Mercy"	Making God Smile	
Straight No Chaser	2008	"Little Saint Nick"	Holiday Spirits	
Nikki Sudden & the Mermaids	1990	"Wonderful"	Smiles, Vibes & Harmony	
Nikki Sudden & the Mermaids	1990	"Whistle In"	Smiles, Vibes & Harmony	
Sugar Ray	2001	"Little Saint Nick"	MTV: TRL Christmas	
The Surfaris	1964	"Be True to Your School"	Hit City '64	
The Surfaris	1964	"Little Deuce Coupe"	Hit City '64	
The Surfaris	1965	"Don't Hurt My Little Sister"	It Ain't Me Babe	
The Surfaris	1965	"California Girls"	It Ain't Me Babe	
The Surfaris	1965	"Dance, Dance, Dance"	It Ain't Me Babe	
Matthew Sweet & Susanna Hoffs	2006	"The Warmth of the Sun"	Under the Covers, Vol. 1	
Taylor Swift	2011	"God Only Knows"		
The Tapes	1981	"Busy Doin' Nothin'"	single b-side to Bits and Pieces	
Chip Taylor & Evie Sands	2000	"Let's Put Our Hearts Together"	Caroline Now!	
Terry Scott Taylor	2002	"Vegetables"	Making God Smile	
Takeshi Terauchi	1972	"Surfin' USA"	Manatsu no Umi wo Buttobase!! - Takeshi Terauchi To Subarashii Ereki Yarotachi	
Thee Headcoats	1990	"409"	Smiles, Vibes & Harmony	
They Might Be Giants	2004	"Caroline, No"	Indestructible Object	
B.J. Thomas	1977	"Don't Worry Baby"	B.J. Thomas	(Note: #17, Billboard Hot 100; #2, Billboard Easy Listening)
The Tokens	1970	"Don't Worry Baby"	Both Sides Now	(Note: #95, Billboard Hot 100)
Triumvirat	1978	"Darlin'"	A La Carte	
Kathy Troccoli	1996	"I Can Hear Music"	Stars and Stripes Vol. 1	
Judie Tzuke	1991	"God Only Knows"	Left Hand Talking	
The Untamed Youth	1990	"Chug-A-Lug"	Smiles, Vibes & Harmony	
Ricky Van Shelton	1996	"Fun, Fun, Fun"	Stars and Stripes Vol. 1	
The Vandals	2000	"Kokomo"	Fear of a Punk Planet (Anniversary Edition)	
Bobby Vee	1966	"Here Today"	single	
The Vogues	1970	"God Only Knows"	The Vogues Sing the Good Old Songs and Other Hits	(Note: 1. 21, Billboard Easy Listening; #101, Bubbling Under Billboard Hot 100)
Wall of Voodoo	1987	"Do It Again"	Happy Planet (album)	
B. J. Ward	1970	"I Just Wasn't Made for These Times"	Vocal Ease	
M. Ward	2015	"You're So Good to Me"	More Rain	
Weezer	2023	"California Girls"	Grammy Tribute To The Beach Boys	
Westlife	2003	"I Get Around "	Unbreakable Tour	
Andy Williams	1967	"God Only Knows"	Love, Andy	
Brooks Williams	2002	"Pet Sounds"	Making God Smile	
Ann Wilson, Nancy Wilson, Jubilant Sykes, & Boys Choir of Harlem	2001	"Good Vibrations"	An All-Star Tribute to Brian Wilson	
Brian Wilson ft. various artists	2014	"God Only Knows"	single, "BBC Music version"	(Note: 1. 20, UK Singles Chart)
Mari Wilson	2012	"Disney Girls"	Cover Stories	
Wilson Phillips	2001	"You're So Good to Me"	An All-Star Tribute to Brian Wilson	
Wilson Phillips	2004	"Dance, Dance, Dance"	California	
Wilson Phillips	2004	"In My Room"	California	
Wilson Phillips	2012	"Good Vibrations"	Dedicated	(Note: 1. 25, Billboard Adult Contemporary)
World Famous Blue Jays	1990	"This Car of Mine "	Smiles, Vibes & Harmony	
Tatsuro Yamashita	1972	"Wendy"	Add Some Music to Your Day	
Tatsuro Yamashita	1972	"Don't Worry Baby"	Add Some Music to Your Day	
Tatsuro Yamashita	1972	"Help Me Rhonda"	Add Some Music to Your Day	
Tatsuro Yamashita	1972	"Car Crazy Cutie"	Add Some Music to Your Day	
Tatsuro Yamashita	1972	"And Your Dream Comes True"	Add Some Music to Your Day	
Tatsuro Yamashita	1972	"Your Summer Dream"	Add Some Music to Your Day	
Tatsuro Yamashita	1984	"Girls on the Beach"	Big Wave	
Tatsuro Yamashita	1984	"Please Let Me Wonder"	Big Wave	
Tatsuro Yamashita	1984	"Darlin'"	Big Wave	
Tatsuro Yamashita	1989	"God Only Knows"	Joy	
Yellowjackets	1997	"God Only Knows"	Wouldn't It Be Nice: A Jazz Portrait of Brian Wilson	
Yipes!	1980	"Darlin'"	A Bit Irrational	(Note: 1. 68 Billboard Hot 100)
Yo La Tengo	1997	"Little Honda"	I Can Hear the Heart Beating as One	
Yo La Tengo	2009	"Shut Down"	Fuckbook	
Yo La Tengo	2009	"Shut Down, Part II"	Fuckbook	
Yo La Tengo	2013	"A Day in the Life of a Tree"	Super Kiwi	

== Sources ==
- Dillon, Mark (2012). Fifty Sides of the Beach Boys: The Songs That Tell Their Story. ECW Press. ISBN 978-1-77090-198-8.
