= Do It Again: A Tribute to Pet Sounds =

Compilation album by various artists
- Released: November 14, 2006
- Length: 42:36

Do It Again: A Tribute to Pet Sounds is a tribute album released on November 14, 2006. It consists of various artists' cover versions of tracks from the Beach Boys' 1966 album Pet Sounds.

== Reception ==
Professional ratings
Review scores
Source	Rating
Record Collector	3/5 stars

Record Collector's Jason Draper wrote that "there’s no exquisite harmonies, meticulous arrangements or attention to detail, but for the most part, everyone follows the script. ... Fans of the original will run screaming, but students who know their left-of-centre artists will find something to embrace."

== Track listing ==
No.	Title	Writer(s)	Artist(s)	Length
1.	"Wouldn't It Be Nice"	Brian Wilson, Tony Asher, Mike Love	Oldham Brothers
2.	"You Still Believe in Me"	Wilson, Asher	Vic Chesnutt
3.	"That's Not Me"	Wilson, Asher	Mystic Chords of Memory / Nobody / Farmer Dave Scher
4.	"Don't Talk (Put Your Head on My Shoulder)"	Wilson, Asher	Centro-Matic
5.	"I'm Waiting for the Day"	Wilson, Love	Micah P. Hinson
6.	"Let's Go Away for Awhile"	Wilson	Antenna Shoes
7.	"Sloop John B"	traditional, arranged by Wilson	Dayna Kurtz
8.	"God Only Knows"	Wilson, Asher	Daniel Johnston
9.	"I Know There's an Answer"	Wilson, Terry Sachen, Love	Mazarin
10.	"Here Today"	Wilson, Asher	Jody Wildgoose
11.	"I Just Wasn't Made for These Times"	Wilson, Asher	Patrick Wolf
12.	"Pet Sounds"	Wilson	Architecture in Helsinki
13.	"Caroline, No"	Wilson, Asher	The Wedding Present

== See also ==
- List of cover versions of Beach Boys songs
