= MOJO Presents Pet Sounds Revisited =

Compilation album by various artists
- Released: July 2012
- Genre: Alternative
- Compiler: MOJO

MOJO Presents Pet Sounds Revisited is a multi-artist tribute album compiled by the monthly journal MOJO, released for their 223rd issue in June 2012. It comprises various alternative musicians' cover versions of tracks from the Beach Boys' album Pet Sounds (1966) in commemoration of the group's 50th anniversary.

== Track listing ==
No.	Title	Writer(s)	Artist(s)	Length
1.	"Wouldn't It Be Nice"	Brian Wilson, Tony Asher, Mike Love	Saint Etienne
2.	"You Still Believe in Me"	Wilson, Asher	The Magnetic North
3.	"That's Not Me"	Wilson, Asher	The Sand Band
4.	"Don't Talk (Put Your Head on My Shoulder)"	Wilson, Asher	Tim Burgess
5.	"I'm Waiting for the Day"	Wilson, Love	Jeffrey Lewis with Wooden Wand and Janet Simpson
6.	"Let's Go Away for Awhile"	Wilson	Neil Cowley Trio
7.	"Sloop John B"	traditional, arranged by Wilson	Tom McRae and the Standing Band
8.	"God Only Knows"	Wilson, Asher	The Flaming Lips
9.	"I Know There's an Answer"	Wilson, Terry Sachen, Love	Les Limiñanas
10.	"Here Today"	Wilson, Asher	Jodie Marie
11.	"I Just Wasn't Made for These Times"	Wilson, Asher	Gaz Coombes
12.	"Pet Sounds"	Wilson	Human Don't Be Angry
13.	"Caroline, No"	Wilson, Asher	Here We Go Magic
14.	"Trombone Dixie"	Wilson	Superimposers

== See also ==
- List of cover versions of Beach Boys songs
