= Making God Smile: An Artists' Tribute to the Songs of Beach Boy Brian Wilson =

Making God Smile

Compilation album by Various Artists
- Released: 2002
- Genre: Christian alternative rock; pop
- Label: Silent Planet
- Producer: Steve West, Tony Shore

Professional ratings
Review scores
Source	Rating
AllMusic	3/5 stars

Making God Smile: An Artists' Tribute to the Songs of Beach Boy Brian Wilson is a tribute album featuring cover versions of songs by Brian Wilson and the Beach Boys performed by Contemporary Christian musicians. Originally released as a single CD, a double album version was released for sale only on the Internet through pastestore.com, the retail website of Paste Music. According to Silent Planet Records' website, this double album quickly sold out. As a result, Silent Planet Records sells individual CD-R copies of the second disc on its website for people who missed their chance to buy the double album.

The cover picture was made by Kurt Lightner. Lightner wrote in the CD's liner notes that the cover is his interpretation of Frank Holmes' original design for the Beach Boys' Smile album. Lightner also wrote that Jimmy A was responsible for directing Silent Planet Records to Lightner to do the cover work for the album. Jimmy A appears on the album in a duet with dc Talk member Kevin Max performing Help Me Rhonda. How Jimmy A and Lightner became acquaintances is unknown but Lightner is known to have other ties to musicians on the album as well; he and Jason Harrod, who plays on the album (see below), both attended Wheaton College (Illinois) at the same time in the early 1990s.

== Track listing ==
Disc one

1. "Your Imagination" Tom Prasada-Rao & Amilia K. Spicer
2. "Good Vibrations" Phil Keaggy
3. "I Just Wasn't Made for These Times" Sixpence None the Richer
4. "I Know There's an Answer (Hang On to Your Ego)" Aaron Sprinkle
5. "Love and Mercy" Randy Stonehill
6. "Help Me Rhonda" Kevin Max and Jimmy Abegg
7. "Heroes and Villains" Phil Madeira
8. "Add Some Music to Your Day" Kate Campbell
9. "'Til I Die" Doug Powell
10. "In My Room" Jason Harrod
11. "This Whole World" Dolour
12. "Vegetables" Terry Scott Taylor
13. "Don't Worry Baby" Derrick Harris
14. "Wouldn't It Be Nice" Jan Krist
15. "Pet Sounds" Brooks Williams
16. "Lay Down Burden" Jane Kelly Williams
17. "Surf's Up" Rick Altizer

Disc two

1. "Caroline No" Frank Lenz & Richard Swift
2. "With Me Tonight" The Lost Dogs
3. "You Still Believe in Me" Jeff Elbel and Ping
4. "God Only Knows" Kate Miner
5. "Don't Talk (Put Your Head on My Shoulder)" Jacob Lawson and Riki Michele
6. "Sloop John B" Irwin Icon
7. "Good Vibrations (Guitar Ending Mix)" Phil Keaggy
8. "Your Imagination (extended mix)" Tom Prasada-Rao and Amilia K. Spicer
9. "Brian Wilson's Room" (bonus track) Harrod and Funck

== See also ==
- List of cover versions of Beach Boys songs
