= Cabinessence =

1969 song by the Beach Boys

- 2011 Mojo single cover

Song by the Beach Boys

from the album 20/20
- Released: February 10, 1969
- Recorded: October 3, 1966 – November 20, 1968
- Studio: Gold Star, Western, Columbia, and Capitol, Hollywood
- Length: 3:34
- Label: Capitol
- Songwriters: Brian Wilson; Van Dyke Parks
- Producer: Brian Wilson

Licensed audio
- "Cabinessence" on YouTube

Audio sample
- file; help

"Cabinessence" (also typeset as "Cabin Essence") is a song by the American rock band the Beach Boys from their 1969 album 20/20 and their unfinished Smile project. Written by Brian Wilson and Van Dyke Parks, Wilson described the song as a "rock and roll waltz" about railroads, while Parks offered that the pair were attempting to write a song that would end on "a freeze frame of the Union Pacific Railroad". The instrumentation includes banjo, cello, dobro, bouzouki, fuzz bass, trumpet, accordion, and percussion that was arranged to sound like the pounding of rail spikes.

During the initial recording for the song, in late 1966, Parks was called in to the studio to settle a dispute from Mike Love over the lyrics, which Love felt may have contained references to drug culture, something with which he did not wish to be associated. Although Parks refused to explain the song to Love, he sang the lines despite his reservations. Parks subsequently disassociated himself from the project, leaving "Cabinessence" unfinished until November 1968, when Wilson's bandmates overdubbed additional vocals onto the recording. It was then included as the closing track on 20/20. Wilson later remade "Cabinessence" as a solo artist for his 2004 album Brian Wilson Presents Smile, presented with the original intended name "Cabin Essence".

"Cabinessence" remains one of the central pieces of the Smile mythos. In 2011, Mojo issued "Cabinessence" as a single, backed with "Wonderful", to promote the forthcoming release of The Smile Sessions. In 2012, the magazine ranked it the 11th-greatest Beach Boys song, deeming it "Smile in microcosm" and a "misunderstood masterpiece". Biographer Jon Stebbins said that its "demonic chanting" exemplified "some of the most haunting, manic, evil-sounding music the Beach Boys ever made".

== Background ==
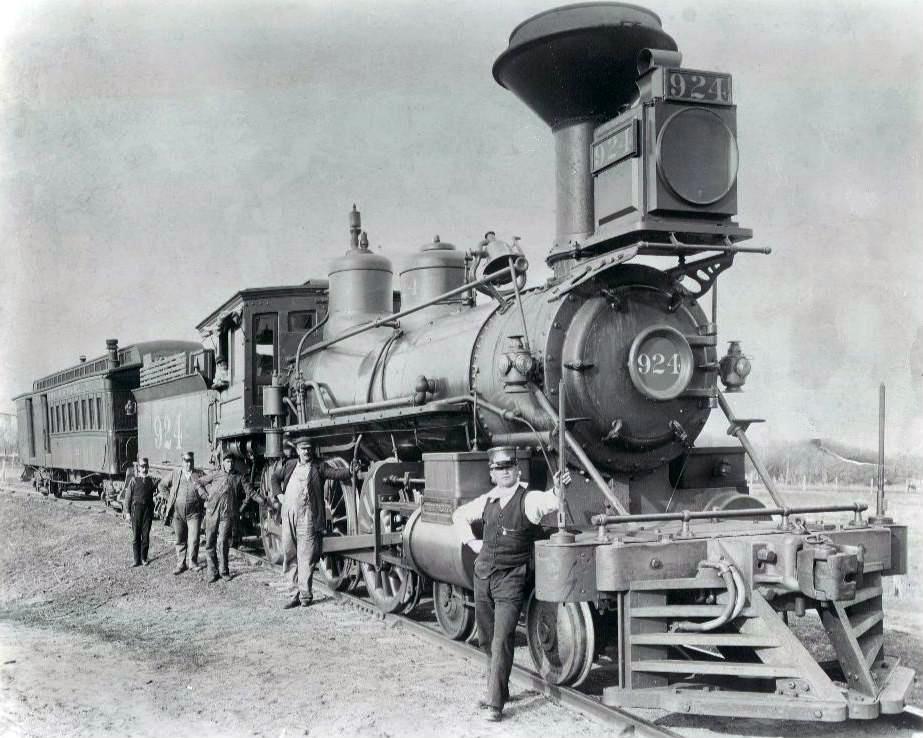
A Union Pacific Railroad locomotive (circa 1930s)

"Cabinessence" (originally conceived as "Cabin Essence") was written by Brian Wilson and guest lyricist Van Dyke Parks for the Beach Boys' (never-finished) album Smile. Parks told biographer Steven Gaines that he and Wilson had been "trying to write a song that would end on a freeze frame of the Union Pacific Railroad—the guys come together and have their picture taken." In 1990, Wilson wrote, "All my life I've been fascinated by waltzes. By this album I rolled around to doin' what I call a rock and roll waltz with 'Cabin Essence.'"

In April 1969, former band associate Michael Vosse penned an article for Fusion magazine in which he discussed the Smile album. In the article, he mentioned that "Cabinessence" evolved from two different songs called "Who Ran the Iron Horse" and "Home on the Range". According to Vosse, "Home on the Range" "was about this Chinese cat working on the railroad; it had the 'crow' line in it. And another song, 'Bicycle Rider,' was to be integrated with it." On "Who Ran the Iron Horse", "[Brian] had a very definite visual image in mind of a train in motion, and suddenly he stopped in the middle of the song with the 'Grand Coolie' refrain." Vosse also said that Dennis Wilson was originally going to sing "Cabinessence" alone, "and sound like a funky cat up in the mountains somewhere singing to a chick by a fireplace; very simple—and that's all there was to it."

Vosse quoted Wilson's explanation of the song, "Uhm ... This song's about the railroads ... and I wondered what the perspective was of the guy who drove the spike ... those Chinese labormen working on the railroad ... like they'd be hitting the thing ... but looking off, too, and kind of noticing a crow flying overhead ... the Oriental mind going on a different track."

== Lyrics ==
=== Content ===
"Cabinessence" is about the arrival of railroads. Journalist Peter Doggett described the song as "trying (among other things) to evoke the essence of life in the cabins for the American pioneers." Clarifying the song's historical references, Parks said:

The whole thing seems to be about the taking of the territory. Folks sing a song of the grange. Granges were collectives of farms that would pool their resources so they could set their own prices, so that they weren't competing so much with each other, but so they were finding a reasonable return for their endeavors. Of course, that’s almost a thing of the past, with the family farm disappearing from the country now and agribusiness the way it is, but the grange system was the backbone of the American farm. And we had to bring the Chinese into this equation, because they were working on the railroad, and the prairie was absolutely dependent on the railroads.

Dennis Wilson sang a vocal line for the song's second chorus. He later stated, "I got off so much on doing that. It's mixed way down in the track, and it’s syncopated all the way through. Right there is my biggest turn-on." The passage was: "Truck-driving man, do what you can. / High-tail your load off the road, out of night-life. / It's a gas, man. I don’t believe I gotta grieve. / In and out of luck with a buck and a booth. / Catching on to the truth, in the vast past, the last gasp. / In the land, in the dust, trust that you must catch as catch can."

The end of the song features the couplet "Over and over the crow cries uncover the cornfield / Over and over the thresher and hovers the wheatfield". In a 1995 interview, Parks commented, "I have no idea what those words mean. I was perhaps thinking of Van Gogh's wheat field or an idealized agrarian environment. Maybe I meant nothing, but I was trying to follow Brian Wilson's vision at that time." Journalist Domenic Priore felt that the song "sums up the Western portions of Smile by crossing continents in music".

=== Artwork ===
Smile artist Frank Holmes' "Lost and found you still remain there" illustration

Artist Frank Holmes, who designed the Smile cover artwork, created an illustration that was inspired by the song's lyrics: "Lost and found you still remain there". Along with several other drawings, it was planned to be included within a booklet packaged with the Smile LP. Holmes shared a summary of his design choices in Priore's 2005 book Smile: The Story of Brian Wilson's Lost Masterpiece:

The design for that one was dominos, from 'Columnated ruins domino'. Originally, when I first dealt with that image, I thought of just what it is: a little image of Grecian columns toppling over onto one another. But I discounted that and chose dominoes instead, because that’s the ideal of one thing falling against another, in making a series of events that are effected by an initial push. That was the same idea with the columnated ruins: each column would fall onto the other, but to avoid any kind of literal reference, I used dominos.

'Lost and found, you still remain there' – for that one there’s a temple filled with rain, and that’s another example of nature influences. I used a Lost and Found Department there – just a intellectual reference to the lost and found without saying the same thing. I think some of that imagery there was not used in the article.

=== Unused lyrics ===
Parks wrote additional lyrics that were not used in the song. They were:

Reconnected telephone direct / Dialing / Different color cords to your / Extension / Don’t forget to mention / This is a recording

Even though the echoes through / My mind / Have filtered through the pines / I came and found my peace / And this is not a recording /

Doobie doo / Doobie doo / Or not doobie

== Composition ==
"Cabinessence" has an A/B/A/B/C formal structure. The track begins with a 40-second section called "Home on the Range", with the accompaniment involving piano, banjo, bass, flute, harmonica, and backing vocals singing an ascending "doing" melody. Musician Mark Johnson referred to the banjo as "traditionally the Great American folk instrument" and likened its use in the song to "part of the soundtrack to a lost Twilight Zone episode".

The next section, "Who Ran the Iron Horse?", contains a more rapturous combination of drums, fuzz bass, cello, and backing vocals. Biographer Jon Stebbins said that the "demonic chanting" exemplified "some of the most haunting, manic, evil-sounding music the Beach Boys ever made". Percussion was arranged to evoke the sound of workers assembling train tracks. PopMatters contributor Thomas Britt noted that the song "contains silences that separate the separate movements of the song, allowing the listener to temporarily reset expectations for the next section."

"Home on the Range" and "Who Ran the Iron Horse?" repeat once and are then followed by "Grand Coolee Dam", which involves the chant "over and over the crow cries uncover the cornfield / over and over the thresher and hovers the wheatfield". This section incorporates a stringed instrument played like a sarod, an instrument associated with Hindustani music. According to journalist Nick Kent, the song "juxtaposed both highly-advanced Western and Eastern musical references" with an "oriental presence".

Speaking about the song, Al Jardine remembered "a lot of challenging vocal exercises and movements in that one. But we enjoyed those challenges." On page 203 of Priore's 1995 book Look! Listen! Vibrate! Smile!, the Wondermints' Darian Sahanaja scrawled a cartoon bubble phrase above a photo of Carl Wilson that joked of the song, "‘So! You expect us to play half-note triplets in 3/4 time and still keep up with your harmonies ON STAGE … DO YA?!?!?!’"

== Recording ==
=== Smile sessions ===
Wilson produced "Cabinessence" in the same modular fashion as "Good Vibrations". Instrumental tracking for the "Home on the Range" section was recorded on October 3, 1966 at Gold Star Studios with engineer Larry Levine. A vocal and instrumental session for "Home On the Range" was taped on October 11 at Western Studio. Carl also overdubbed guitar on "Home on the Range" at this session. The next day, Brian produced the "Grand Coulee Dam" section at Columbia studio. In 1990, Wilson wrote, "The night I cut the instrumental part of ['Cabinessence'] no one could believe that a waltz could rock that hard. I had the 6-string bass player play electric fuzz tones. This got it goin' good. I was sure that I had recorded the most rockin' waltz ever recorded."

I think Van Dyke is really talented, brilliant, and fun. ... Just because I said I didn't know what [the words] meant didn't mean I didn't like them. ... And it wasn't like I was against his lyrics. But people don’t know the way I think. And they don’t give a fuck about the way I think, either. ... I was just asking: What did it mean?

— Mike Love, commenting on the "Cabinessence" dispute

On December 6, further vocal overdubs were tracked at Columbia for "Cabinessence", a session that included the recording of Mike Love's singing on "The Grand Coulee Dam". Love did not understand the lyrics "over and over the crow cries uncover the cornfield" and thought that the song may have contained references to drug culture, something that he did not wish to be associated with. (Note: Love had voiced similar objections to the Pet Sounds song "Hang On to Your Ego" a year earlier.) He took to characterizing Parks' lyrics as "acid alliteration".

To settle this dispute, Brian telephoned Parks and asked him to come to the studio. Prior to this meeting, the only Beach Boy besides Brian that Parks had interacted with was Dennis, who approved the lyrics, and Parks expected that the rest of the band would similarly approve. Upon arrival to the studio, Parks refused to explain the song to Love and responded by simply stating he did not know the meaning of the lyric. When Parks was interviewed for the 1976 television special The Beach Boys: It's OK!, he characterized the song as part of an "American Gothic"-style piece and remembered, "I said [to Mike], 'I don't know what these lyrics are about. They aren't important, throw them away.'"

According to biographer Peter Ames Carlin, Parks had been unwilling to be drawn into an argument over the quality of his work. Love reflected that Parks did not appear insulted by his questioning, but speculated that Parks may have feigned ignorance of the song's meaning "just because I was there in his face." In another interview from 2004, Parks said that he had been "physically afraid" of Love, "because Brian had confided to me what Mike had done to him", but did not elaborate further. In a 2013 interview, Parks surmised, "I don't think the crows created a problem at all. I think the music created the problem for Mike, and it was perfectly understandable that he was terribly jealous of me, as it became evident that he wanted my job [as Brian's lyricist]. And I did not want a job that somebody else wanted."

Love sang the line despite his reservations. On December 27, 1966, further vocals were recorded at Western for the "Who Ran the Iron Horse" section. By April 1967, Parks had withdrawn from the project, which was shelved soon thereafter. He later cited the "Cabinessence" dispute as the moment when "the whole house of cards began tumbling down".

=== 20/20 sessions ===
On November 20, 1968, "Cabinessence" was given additional vocal overdubs by Carl and Dennis Wilson at Capitol Studios for the group's forthcoming album 20/20. According to Carlin, Brian was opposed to the inclusion of the track and did not participate on the track with the rest of the band. Engineer Stephen Desper commented that "Cabinessence" was "finished, more or less, with Brian's guidance through Carl." Mixing for the song was completed on November 22.

20/20 was issued by Capitol in February 1969 with "Cabinessence" as the album's closing track. Biographer David Leaf wrote that there were reportedly "twenty-five different mixes and combinations" of "Cabinessence" that had been pressed on acetate discs before the group settled on the version they released. In his Fusion article, Vosse claimed that the 20/20 recording was "new, because before his ear operation about a year ago, Brian could not hear in stereo." However, Wilson's surgery had actually failed to restore his hearing, and the only new contents on the 20/20 track were the vocal overdubs from Carl and Dennis.

== Critical reception ==
According to ethnomusicologist David Toop, when 20/20 was released, the inclusion of "Cabinessence" was "the biggest thrill" for "true fans" of Beach Boys, even though "it didn't make a lot of sense" as the album's closing track. In his contemporary review of the 20/20 album, Rolling Stone's Arthur Schmidt wrote that the song was "one of the finest things Brian has ever done ... The totally orchestrated cacophony was an innovation in rock when they used it in Smiley Smile, and is still done here better than anywhere else. Piano imitates ukulele, and the solo vocal is gentle, but brilliant." An uncredited writer from Hit Parader opined that "Cabinessence" was a "highly imaginative mini-rock symphony ... with complex orchestral arrangements built around complex vocal arrangements. ... an incredible dynamic piece of music without the cleverness of 'Good Vibrations'."

Retrospectively, academic John Covach wrote that although the song "seems lyrically disorganized and more episodic than even the alternate version of 'Heroes and Villains' ... it does have that aura of manic brilliance that characterized Brian's work before the collapse of Smile". Taylor Parkes of The Quietus wrote that although Wilson and Parks' original concept for the song "proved somewhat overambitious ... instead we got the final section of 'Cabin Essence', one of the most beautiful and deeply evocative pieces of music we're ever likely to hear; the next best thing." In Johnson's belief, the song could be viewed as "an exploration a la John Steinbeck of what American music's function really is. To simply fill a room, while we go about our days and nights."

In 2012, Mojo ranked it number 11 in the magazine's list of the greatest Beach Boys songs. Its entry stated, "Cabinessence is Smile in microcosm. Vast in scope, unprecedented in its ambition and as much an unsolved sonic riddle as the album it had been written for, this was the misunderstood masterpiece that caused Mike Love to crack and the project to flounder."

== Legacy ==
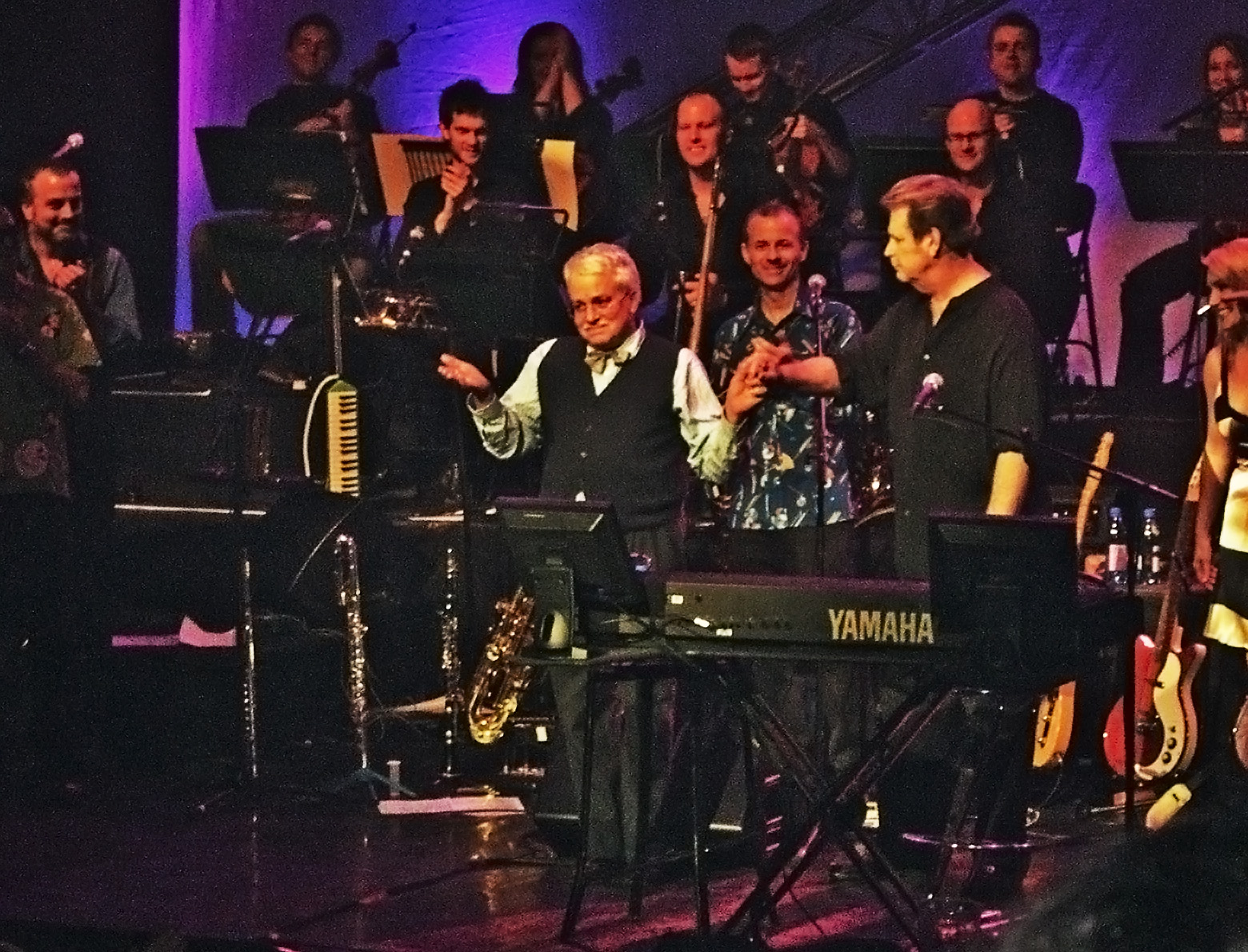
Parks joining Wilson onstage after a performance of Brian Wilson Presents Smile at the Royal Festival Hall, 2004.

In the early 1990s, producer Terry Melcher invited Parks to play synthesizer on the group's album Summer in Paradise (1992). When Parks arrived at Melcher's home in Monterey, he found Love meditating in the living room. As Parks recalled in a 1995 interview, "For the first time in 30 years, he was able to ask me directly, once again, 'What do those lyrics -- Over and over the crow flies, uncover the cornfield -- mean?' And I was able to tell him, once again, 'I don't know.'" Afterward, Love joined Parks on his flight back to Los Angeles. "We had a nice chat and he insisted that he wanted to split the cost of the flight with me, so he gave me a card with his number on it. The next morning, I called to discover it was a disconnected number. And that was the last time I saw Mike Love."

In 2001, after joining Brian's supporting band, Darian Sahanaja lobbied for "Cabinessence" to be performed at the "All-Star Tribute to Brian Wilson" concert held at Radio City Music Hall, however, the song was not played due to its complexity. It was later included in Wilson's concert setlists, in medley with "Wonderful", and then for Brian Wilson Presents Smile (2004).

Writing his 2006 biography of Wilson, Peter Ames Carlin wrote that the "Cabinessence" lyric dispute between Love and Parks "has long become a central piece of the Smile legend, both because it marked a turning point in the album’s progress and because it resonates with so much psychological and cultural subtext." In a 2012 interview, Parks stated that, when people asked him for his thoughts on the release of The Smile Sessions, "I tell them with how happy I am to see the lads finally eat that crow over the cornfield."

== Personnel ==
Per band archivist Craig Slowinski.

The Beach Boys

- Al Jardine – vocals ("doing-doing", chorus, and tag)
- Bruce Johnston – vocals (chorus and tag)
- Mike Love – vocals (lead, chorus, and tag)
- Brian Wilson – vocals ("doing-doing", chorus, and tag)
- Carl Wilson – vocals ("doing-doing", lead, chorus, and tag), acoustic guitar
- Dennis Wilson – vocals ("Truck Drivin' Man", chorus, and tag)

Guest

- Van Dyke Parks – upright piano

Session musicians (later known as "the Wrecking Crew")

- James Burton – dobro
- Jesse Ehrlich – cello
- Armand Kaproff – cello
- Carl Fortina – accordion
- Jim Gordon – tambourine with a stick (chorus), "bell goodies" (tag)
- Carol Kaye – banjo
- Jay Migliori – flute
- Oliver Mitchell – trumpet
- Tommy Morgan – harmonica, bass harmonica (chorus)
- Bill Pitman – Danelectro fuzz bass (chorus)
- Lyle Ritz – upright bass
- Tommy Tedesco – acoustic guitar, bouzouki (tag)

== Bibliography ==
- Badman, Keith (2004). The Beach Boys: The Definitive Diary of America's Greatest Band, on Stage and in the Studio. Backbeat Books. ISBN 978-0-87930-818-6.
- Carlin, Peter Ames (2006). Catch a Wave: The Rise, Fall, and Redemption of the Beach Boys' Brian Wilson. Rodale. ISBN 978-1-59486-320-2.
- Covach, John (1997). Understanding Rock: Essays in Musical Analysis. Oxford University Press. ISBN 978-0-19-535662-5.
- Doggett, Peter (1997). "Smile: The Great Lost Album". In Abbott, Kingsley (ed.). Back to the Beach: A Brian Wilson and the Beach Boys Reader. Helter Skelter. ISBN 978-1-90092-402-3.
- Gaines, Steven (1986). Heroes and Villains: The True Story of The Beach Boys (1. Da Capo Press ed.). New York: Da Capo Press. ISBN 0306806479.
- Kent, Nick (1995) [1975]. "The Last Beach Movie: Brian Wilson 1942–". In Priore, Domenic (ed.). Look, Listen, Vibrate, Smile!. Last Gasp. pp. 262–267. ISBN 0-86719-417-0.
- Leaf, David (1978). The Beach Boys and the California Myth. Grosset & Dunlap. ISBN 978-0-448-14626-3.
- Love, Mike (2016). Good Vibrations: My Life as a Beach Boy. Penguin Publishing Group. ISBN 978-0-698-40886-9.
- Priore, Domenic (2005). Smile: The Story of Brian Wilson's Lost Masterpiece. London: Sanctuary. ISBN 1860746276.
- Sanchez, Luis (2014). The Beach Boys' Smile. Bloomsbury Publishing. ISBN 978-1-62356-956-3.
- Stebbins, Jon (2011). The Beach Boys FAQ: All That's Left to Know About America's Band. Backbeat Books. ISBN 9781458429148.
- White, Timothy (1996). The Nearest Faraway Place: Brian Wilson, the Beach Boys, and the Southern Californian Experience. Macmillan. ISBN 0333649370.
