= Smiling Pets =

Compilation album by various artists
- Released: May 15, 1998
- Recorded: 1997–1998
- Genres: Indie rock; experimental; electronic; noise
- Length: 55:11
- Label: Sony Records (SRCS 325)
- Compiler: Seiji Morita

Smiling Pets is a multi-artist tribute album consisting of experimental/alternative cover versions of Beach Boys songs from Pet Sounds (1966) and the never-finished Smile project. It was released exclusively in Japan by Sony Records in March 1998.

== Background ==
Some song titles differ from how they have been officially published by the Beach Boys. The most prominent of which is "Tones", which is a cover version of the instrumental Smile track "Holidays". Prior to Smiling Pets, most Smile material was only sparsely available on the compilation Good Vibrations: Thirty Years of The Beach Boys (1993). Because "Holidays" had not been officially released until more than a decade later on The Smile Sessions (2011), it is highly likely that unauthorized bootlegs with erroneous track lists were consulted by Smiling Pets artists. "Tones" (also known as "Tune X") was actually a working title for an entirely different composition recorded by Carl Wilson during Smile sessions. Another misleading title is "Heroes and Villains", which can arguably be more accurately described as a reprise of "Do You Like Worms?".

Tracks from this album later reappeared on individual band compilations or album reissues. "Surfin' U.S.A." is present in complete form on Melt-Banana's MxBx 1998/13,000 Miles at Light Velocity (1999). Secret Chiefs 3's cover versions of "Good Vibrations" and "Heroes and Villains" are on their compilation Path of Most Resistance (2007). The Olivia Tremor Control's versions of "Do You Like Worms?" and "Little Pad" were later included as bonus tracks on reissued releases of Music from the Unrealized Film Script: Dusk at Cubist Castle (1996).

An album similarly-fashioned to Smiling Pets was released two years earlier, entitled The Christmas Album, which was a tribute to the compilation A Christmas Gift for You from Phil Spector (1963). It was also compiled by Seiji Morita and included some of the same performers.

The Ships and FORMS are aliases of the Olivia Tremor Control and Secret Chiefs 3, respectively. OnoTetsu is the pianist for Harpy, an experimental Japanese noise band. Short Hair Front and Feelds were short-lived bands seemingly led by the album compiler Seiji Morita, and he is credited as arranger for their contributions "I'm Waiting for the Day" and "I Just Wasn't Made for These Times". Little is known about the album's more unrecognizable artists Sports Guitar or R. Gree & Grey Tea. They may also be pseudonyms.

== Critical reception ==
Writing in his 2005 book about Smile, Domenic Priore praised Smiling Pets and highlighted "Fall Breaks and Back to Winter" and "Cool, Cool Water" as stand-out tracks.

== Track listing ==
No.	Title	Writer(s)	Performer(s)	Length
1.	"Wonderful"	Brian Wilson, Van Dyke Parks	Adventures In Stereo	2:10
2.	"Good Vibrations"	Wilson, Tony Asher, Mike Love	Secret Chiefs 3	4:00
3.	"Surfin' U.S.A. / You're Welcome"	Wilson, Chuck Berry	Melt-Banana	3:22
4.	"I'm Waiting for the Day"	Wilson, Asher	Short Hair Front	2:58
5.	"Do You Like Worms? (Do You Dig Worms?)"	Wilson, Parks	The Olivia Tremor Control	4:00
6.	"Fall Breaks and Back to Winter (Spring Breaks and Back to Winter)"	Wilson	Jim O'Rourke	3:05
7.	"Wonderful"	Wilson, Parks	Sports Guitar	2:48
8.	"Here Today"	Wilson, Asher	Thurston Moore	4:13
9.	"Tones"	Wilson	OnoTetsu	1:36
10.	"Tea Break"		R. Gray & Green Tee	0:38
11.	"Heroes and Villains"	Wilson, Parks	FORMS	4:42
12.	"Cool, Cool Water"	Wilson	Harpy	2:46
13.	"You Still Believe In Me"	Wilson, Asher	Seagull Screaming Kiss Her Kiss Her	2:50
14.	"Little Pad"	Wilson	The Ships	2:43
15.	"Wind Chimes (After Perpetuity's Noon)"	Wilson, Parks	David Grubbs	4:08
16.	"I Just Wasn't Made for These Times"	Wilson, Asher	Feelds	3:15
17.	"Let's Go Away For Awhile"	Wilson	John McEntire	2:41
18.	"Caroline, No"	Wilson, Asher	DM3	3:14
Total length:				55:11

== Personnel ==
Production staff

- Seiji Morita – compilation producer
- Masami Hatta – executive producer
- Mitsuo Koike – mastering
- Hideki Ohtsuka – photography
- Youko Kobayashi – artwork

== See also ==
- List of cover versions of Beach Boys songs
