= Smiles, Vibes & Harmony: A Tribute to Brian Wilson =

1990 tribute compilation album by various artists

Compilation album by various artists
- Released: 1990
- Genre: Alternative rock
- Label: De Milo
- Producer: Barry Soltz
- Compiler: Barry Soltz

Smiles, Vibes & Harmony: A Tribute to Brian Wilson is a 1990 tribute album devoted to the compositions of Brian Wilson of the Beach Boys. It features cover versions mostly by alternative rock artists. The cover artwork is based on the artwork created for the Beach Boys' Smile album. Instead of the "Smile Shop", it depicts the Radiant Radish, a health food store that Wilson briefly operated.

== Track listing ==
No.	Title	Writer(s)	Performed by	Length
1.	"Dance, Dance, Dance"	Brian Wilson/Carl Wilson	Handsome Dick Manitoba
2.	"This Car of Mine"	B. Wilson/Mike Love	World Famous Blue Jays
3.	"Johnny Carson"	B. Wilson	Das Damen
4.	"Darlin'"	B. Wilson/Love	The Records
5.	"Gonna Hustle You"	B. Wilson	Peter Stampfel & the Bottle Caps
6.	"Chug-A-Lug"	B. Wilson/Gary Usher/Love	The Untamed Youth
7.	"Wind Chimes"	B. Wilson/Van Dyke Parks	The Mooseheart Faith
8.	"Pet Sounds"	B. Wilson	Dos Dragsters (Sea Foam Green)
9.	"I Know There's an Answer"	B. Wilson/Terry Sachen/Love	Sonic Youth
10.	"Drive-In"	B. Wilson	The A-Bones
11.	"409"	B. Wilson/Usher/Love	Thee Headcoats
12.	"Be True to Your School"	B. Wilson/Love	The Cynics
13.	"Help Me, Rhonda"	B. Wilson/Love	The Original Sins
14.	"I Wanna Pick You Up"	B. Wilson	Sharky's Machine
15.	"Meet Me in My Dreams Tonight"	B. Wilson/Andy Paley/Andy Dean	The Vacant Lot
16.	"Wonderful / Whistle-In"	B. Wilson	Nikki Sudden & the Mermaids

== Personnel ==
Production staff

- Pete Ciccone — artwork
- Michael Sarsfield — mastering
- Tom Steele — mastering
- Barry Soltz — producer, compiler
