= Do You Like Worms? =

"Do You Like Worms"

Song by the Beach Boys

from the album Good Vibrations: Thirty Years of the Beach Boys
- Released: July 29, 1993
- Recorded: October 18, 1966 – January 5, 1967
- Studio: Western and Columbia, Hollywood
- Length: 4:00
- Label: Capitol
- Songwriters: Brian Wilson; Van Dyke Parks
- Producer: Brian Wilson

Licensed audio
- "Do You Like Worms" on YouTube

Audio sample
- file; help

"Do You Like Worms?" (sometimes known as "Roll Plymouth Rock" or erroneously referred to as "Do You Dig Worms?") is a song by American rock band the Beach Boys from their unfinished album Smile. Written by Brian Wilson and Van Dyke Parks, the song is about the recolonization of the American continent and contains references to the Sandwich Islands and "Bicycle Rider Back" playing cards. None of the lyrics appear to mention worms; asked about the title, Parks said he could not remember where it came from, although in a Reddit AMA, Wilson stated that Parks had come up with it.

The keyboard break melody was later reworked into the chorus of "Heroes and Villains" (1967). Wilson rerecorded "Do You Like Worms" as "Roll Plymouth Rock" for his solo album Brian Wilson Presents Smile (2004). The Beach Boys' original recording of "Do You Like Worms?" was released on the compilations Good Vibrations: Thirty Years of the Beach Boys (1993) and The Smile Sessions (2011). Cover versions have been recorded by the Olivia Tremor Control and Secret Chiefs 3.

== Background ==
In the May 1967 issue of Crawdaddy!, editor Paul Williams reported that the upcoming Beach Boys album Smile would include "something about going in the yard to eat worms." Asked about the song in 2004, co-writer Van Dyke Parks could not remember where the title had originated from, speculating, "I have a feeling it was maybe an engineer, or maybe Brian, maybe Mike Love. There aren't any other words in the song that relate to that title."

Biographer Byron Preiss wrote that the melodic figure in the "Bicycle Rider" portion of the song was an outlet for Wilson's "obsession with the sound of 'light' wheels—the gentle clicking of a coasting bicycle". In April 1969, former band associate Michael Vosse penned an article for Fusion magazine in which he discussed the Smile album. In the article, he mentioned that a song called "Bicycle Rider" "was to be integrated" with another song, "Home on the Range", that later evolved into "Cabinessence".

Commenting on the release of The Smile Sessions (2011), Al Jardine stated: "I kept yelling at people over at Capitol that there’s not one goddamn lyric about worms on this track. It’s called 'Roll Plymouth Rock'. I defy you to find anything about worms on there. But they wanted to name it 'Do You Like Worms'. ... I’m sure that there was a song that Brian and Van Dyke did do called 'Do You Like Worms' that they didn't even play for us."

== Lyrics and artwork ==
Smile artist Frank Holmes' "Do You Like Worms" illustration

"Do You Like Worms?" is about the recolonization of the American continent. In Parks' words, "It's about bringing this Euro-sensibility into the taming of the American continent, from Plymouth Rock to Waikiki." The "bicycle rider" mentioned in the lyric is a reference to "Bicycle Rider Back" playing cards printed by the United States Playing Card Company during the 19th century. Parks commented, "A lot of people misinterpreted that, but that's OK; it's OK not to be told what to think, if you're an audience."

Artist Frank Holmes, who designed the Smile cover artwork, created an illustration that was inspired by the song's lyrics: "Do You Like Worms". Along with several other drawings, it was planned to be included within a booklet packaged with the Smile LP. Holmes shared a summary of his design choices in Priore's 2005 book Smile: The Story of Brian Wilson's Lost Masterpiece:

The image for this one was of a civilisation steaming on the Sandwich Isles. I used tea kettles and a bacon-and-tomato sandwich – a joke about the Sandwich Isles.
The blankets and the fishing hooks are a reference to my childhood. I used to go to church socials, where they had a game called ‘fish’ where you’d put a little fishing pole over a blanket, and there’d be someone on the other side that would hang a little toy or a gift onto that. Then you’d pull back and you’d have this treat. So, I had this as Indians selling Manhattan Island for $28 worth of beads.

Then there’s the can of worms. I took that from the lyric ‘Do you like worms’, but then, what do you do with that? You show someone enjoying a worm.
The Rhode Island Red thing is a reference to Plymouth Rock, which is a type of chicken, like a Rhode Island Red. I used that as loose poultry connection. You had Rhode Island and Plymouth Rock, then you’ve got a couple of Indians behind the rock and people smoking a pipe there.

One of the lyrics written for the song was "And as we returned to the East or West Indies / We always got them confused". Holmes explained more about the song in a 1997 issue of the Endless Summer Quarterly fanzine:

And then there's a piece called "Ribbon of concrete, see what you done done", which became "Bicycle rider, see what you done done". It came from the old standard "CC Rider, see what you done done". I remember it went on, "See what you done done, to the church of the American Indian..." And there was a last part on there that went something like: 'Having returned to the East or West Indies - we always got them confused...' It had to do with the white man's advancement.

According to journalist Domenic Priore, the line about the "ribbon of concrete" symbolized a negative variant of the lyric "that ribbon of highway" from the American folk song "This Land Is Your Land", while the tag lyric, "mahala lu lei", refers to a Hawaiian Thanksgiving prayer.

== Recording ==
Most of "Do You Like Worms?" was recorded at one session held on October 18, 1966 at Western Studio. During the tracking, Wilson struggled with getting the right sound from bassist Carol Kaye before finally instructing her to strum softer. He then said, "I knew I'd find it, if I really searched and reached out." In his review of The Smile Sessions for Rolling Stone, David Fricke remarked that this exchange was the "moment in this five-CD ocean of music when you agree with its creator ... that the greatest pop album ever made is still within reach."

The group overdubbed vocals onto the track on December 21 at Columbia Studio. At some point, Wilson began considering the "Bicycle Rider" theme for inclusion in the structure of "Heroes and Villains". Further overdubs to the "Bicycle Rider" section were recorded on January 5, 1967. The latter session was logged as "Heroes and Villains: Part 2". According to historian Keith Badman, the lyrics about the "Sandwich Isles" and "ribbon of concrete" were "apparently not recorded".

== Aftermath and "Roll Plymouth Rock" ==
When the Beach Boys performed "Heroes and Villains" at their concerts in the 1970s, they incorporated the "Bicycle Rider" lyrics from "Do You Like Worms?". In 1978, Bruce Johnston told biographer David Leaf that the band's manager James William Guercio had insisted on opening L.A. (Light Album) with a Smile track titled "Rock Plymouth Rock/Roll".

In 2004, Wilson rerecorded "Do You Like Worms" as "Roll Plymouth Rock" for his album Brian Wilson Presents Smile. Asked about the title change, Wilson explained, "Because we wanted something a little more appropriate, you know? Something that sounded more appropriate."

== Personnel ==
Per band archivist Craig Slowinski.

The Beach Boys

- Al Jardine - backing and harmony vocals
- Bruce Johnston – backing and harmony vocals
- Mike Love - backing and harmony vocals
- Brian Wilson - lead, backing and harmony vocals, harpsichord
- Carl Wilson - backing and harmony vocals; overdubbed 12-string electric slide guitar (uncertain credit)
- Dennis Wilson - backing and harmony vocals

Guest

- Van Dyke Parks - piano with taped strings, tack piano

Session musicians

- Jerry Cole - 12-string electric rhythm guitar; overdubbed 12-string electric slide guitar (uncertain credit)
- Gene Estes - timpani
- Jim Gordon - "parade drum" with mallet, conga
- Carol Kaye - Fender bass
- BIll Pitman – Danelectro bass
- Lyle Ritz – upright bass

== Cover versions ==
- 1994 – Ant-Bee, With My Favorite "Vegetables" & Other Bizarre Muzik (also found on some bootlegs, most notably Vigotone)
- 1998 – The Olivia Tremor Control, Smiling Pets (as "Do You Like Worms? (Do You Dig Worms?)")
- 1998 – FORMS, Smiling Pets (as "Heroes and Villains")
