= The Mooseheart Faith Stellar Groove Band =

- Members: Joe Dean; Todd Homer; Larry Robinson; Ritchie West

The Mooseheart Faith Stellar Groove Band, sometimes known as Mooseheart Faith, is a Los Angeles–based rock band blending 1960s folk rock and psychedelia, 1970s space rock and progressive rock and a variety of influences from world music and jazz.

== Background ==
The core of the band is made of two main vocalists: Todd Homer, formerly of the punk band The Angry Samoans, and Larry Robinson, formerly of the 1970s teen pop/soul group Apollo, who also performs under the name OMB. Both of the band's primary vocalists play a number of other instruments on the band's recordings. Homer plays bass, harmonica, and synthesizer; while Robinson plays guitar, keyboards, synthesizer, and theremin. The band also features drummer Ritchie West (also of Camper Van Beethoven and The Wrestling Worms) and bassist Joe Dean (also of Crawlspace).

Their name is derived from a 19th-century man named either Edward Mooseheart or Edwin Mooseheart, known for his public statements on UFOs.

== Discography ==
=== Albums ===
- Mooseheart Faith (1988, De Milo Records)
- Magic Square of the Sun (1990, Stellar Records)
- Golden Light (1992, Stellar Records)
- Cosmic Dialogues (1993, September Gurls)
- Coronal Mass Injection (1998, September Gurls)
- Memories of the Future (2010, Stellar Records)

=== As various artists ===
- Smiles, Vibes & Harmony: A Tribute to Brian Wilson (1990, De Milo Records) – "Wind Chimes"
- Groin Thunder! A Tribute to The Troggs (1992, Dog Meat Records) – "Love Is All Around"
- Fun with Mushrooms (1993, Delerium Records) – "Thought Dial"
- Eyesore: A Stab at the Residents (1996, Vaccination Records, as "The Mooseheart Faith") – "Firefly/Vinegar"
- Not of This Earth: Sci-Fi Movies Tribute (2003, Black Widow Records) – "Viva Von Daniken"
- Yr Agog (Oggum Records) – "Invisible Invader" & "Face on Mars"
