= An All-Star Tribute to Brian Wilson =

2001 tribute concert in New York City

An All-Star Tribute to Brian Wilson was a tribute concert held at New York City's famed Radio City Music Hall on March 29, 2001 that TNT presented on July 4, 2001.

== Setlist ==
Chazz Palminteri hosted the show and Cameron Crowe, Dennis Hopper, Rachel Hunter, and Sir George Martin spoke on behalf of Brian Wilson's life and musical success. The following songs are only those included on the DVD: in all a total of 34 titles were performed, including songs from Pet Sounds.

| Song | Artist(s) | Composer(s) |
|---|---|---|
| "Our Prayer" | The Boys Choir of Harlem | Brian Wilson |
| "California Girls" | Ricky Martin | Mike Love and Brian Wilson |
| "Help Me, Rhonda" | Ricky Martin | Mike Love and Brian Wilson |
| "Surfer Girl" | Paul Simon | Brian Wilson |
| "Surf City" | The Go-Go's | Jan Berry and Brian Wilson |
| "In My Room" | Carly Simon, David Crosby and Jimmy Webb | Gary Usher and Brian Wilson |
| "The Warmth of the Sun" | Vince Gill | Mike Love and Brian Wilson |
| "I Get Around" | Evan and Jaron | Mike Love and Brian Wilson |
| "God Only Knows" | Elton John | Tony Asher and Brian Wilson |
| "I Just Wasn't Made for These Times" | Aimee Mann and Michael Penn | Tony Asher and Brian Wilson |
| "Don't Worry Baby" | Billy Joel | Roger Christian and Brian Wilson |
| "Sail On, Sailor" | Darius Rucker and Matthew Sweet | Tandyn Almer, Raymond Kennedy, Jack Rieley (a/k/a John Frank Rieley III), Van Dyke Parks and Brian Wilson |
| "You're So Good to Me" | Wilson Phillips | Mike Love and Brian Wilson |
| "Good Vibrations" | Ann and Nancy Wilson of Heart, Jubilant Sykes and The Boys Choir of Harlem | Mike Love and Brian Wilson |
| "Surf's Up" | Vince Gill, Jimmy Webb and David Crosby | Van Dyke Parks and Brian Wilson |
| "Heroes and Villains" | Brian Wilson | Van Dyke Parks and Brian Wilson |
| "Wouldn't It Be Nice" | Elton John and Brian Wilson | Tony Asher, Mike Love and Brian Wilson |
| "Barbara Ann" | Brian Wilson and All-Star Ensemble | Fred Fassert |
| "Surfin' USA" | Brian Wilson and All-Star Ensemble | Brian Wilson |
| "Fun, Fun, Fun" | Brian Wilson and All-Star Ensemble | Mike Love and Brian Wilson |
| "Love and Mercy" | Brian Wilson and The Boys Choir of Harlem | Brian Wilson |

On the DVD, there's a bonus track: "Do It Again" by Brian Wilson. It was written by Mike Love and Brian Wilson.
