= Jan Krist =

American musician

- Born: Jan Krist
- Genres: Folk, contemporary Christian,
- Website: www.jankrist.net

Jan Krist is an American singer-songwriter from Detroit, Michigan whose music is primarily folk. In 1993, Jan was a New Folk Finalist at the Kerville Music Festival for her songs titled "Someone" and "Daisies in a Bowl".

She performs Contemporary Christian music.

Jan is married to Alan Finkbeiner. Jan is a founding member of the Yellow Room Gang (YRG), a songwriting collective centered in South-East Michigan. She often performs with fellow YRG member Jim Bizer.

== Discography ==
- Decapitated Society, 1992
- Wing and a Prayer, 1992
- See Stone, EP
- Curious, 1996
- Outpost of the Counter-Culture, 2001
- Love Big Us Small
- Wounded Me, Wounded You, 2002
- When Planets Collide, 2004
- Fallow Ground, 2010
