= Let's Go Away for Awhile =

1966 instrumental by the Beach Boys

- Label to the 1966 single release as b-side of "Good Vibrations"

Instrumental by the Beach Boys

from the album Pet Sounds
- Released: May 16, 1966
- Recorded: January 18–19, 1966
- Studio: Western, Hollywood
- Genre: Lounge
- Length: 2:25
- Label: Capitol
- Composer: Brian Wilson
- Producer: Brian Wilson

Audio sample
- file; help

"Let's Go Away for Awhile" [sic] is an instrumental by the American rock band the Beach Boys from their 1966 album Pet Sounds. It was composed and produced by Brian Wilson, and performed by uncredited session musicians. The track is the first of two instrumentals that appear on the album, the other being its title track.

The piece was intended to have a vocal, but Wilson ultimately decided that it did not need one. He later called it his favorite instrumental that he ever wrote, and commented that it was possibly influenced by Burt Bacharach's music. Several months after the album's release, the track was issued as the B-side to the band's single "Good Vibrations".

== Background and composition ==
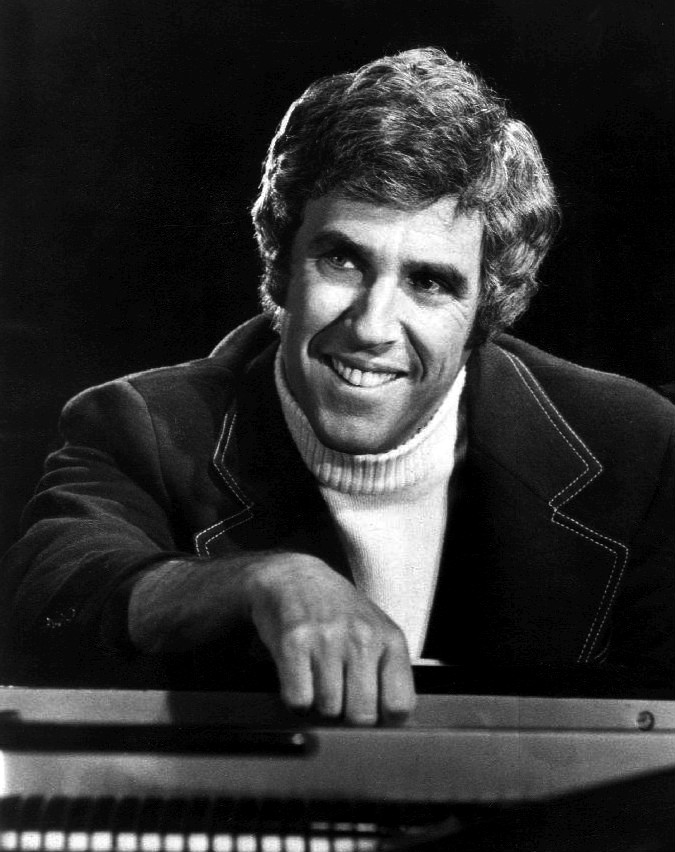
"Let's Go Away for Awhile" was inspired by the work of Burt Bacharach (pictured)

"Let's Go Away for Awhile" was composed by Brian Wilson and provisionally titled "The Old Man and The Baby". Wilson surmised that he may have subconsciously based the chord progression on the music of Burt Bacharach. Bacharach's "Are You There (With Another Girl)", in particular, may have directly influenced Wilson to write "Let's Go Away for Awhile". Musicologist James Perone wrote of the track:

There are melodic features but no tune to speak of. As an instrumental composition, this gives the piece an atmospheric feel; however, the exact mood is difficult to define. [...] To the extent that the listener hears 'Let's Go Away for Awhile' as an incomplete piece, it is possible to understand it as a reflection of the alienation—the sense of not quite fitting in—of the bulk of Tony Asher's lyrics in the songs on Pet Sounds."

An early full working title was "Let's Go Away for Awhile (And Then We'll Have World Peace)"—the parenthetical being a reference to Del Close and John Brent's 1961 comedy album How to Speak Hip. Tony Asher explained:

There was an album out called How to Speak Hip [...] a lampooning of the language instruction albums. I played it for Brian, and it destroyed him, killed him. Brian picked up a couple of references on the album. One of them was this hip character that said if everyone were "laid back and cool, then we'd have world peace." So Brian started going around saying, "Hey, would somebody get me a candy bar, and then we'll have world peace." [Brian] even made an acetate disc with a label on it with the title.

== Recording ==
The bulk of "Let's Go Away for Awhile" was recorded on January 18, 1966 at United Western Recorders. String and flute overdubs were recorded the next day. Wilson stated: "We used dynamics like Beethoven. You know, Beethoven, the dynamic music maker." In 1966, Wilson considered the track to be "the finest piece of art" he had made up to that point, and that every component of its production "worked perfectly". A year later he expounded,

I applied a certain set of dynamics through the arrangement and the mixing and got a full musical extension of what I'd planned during the earliest stages of the theme. I think the chord changes are very special. I used a lot of musicians on the track; twelve violins, piano, four saxes, oboe, vibes, a guitar with a Coke bottle on the strings for a semi-steel guitar effect. Also, I used two basses and percussion. The total effect is 'Let's Go Away For Awhile', which is something everyone in the world must have said at some time or another. Nice thought; most of us don't go away, but it's still a nice thought. The track was supposed to be the backing for a vocal, but I decided to leave it alone. It stands up well alone.

During the song's recording session, Wilson can be heard humming a short part of a vocal melody. However, he would later decide to keep it as an instrumental. In 1995, it emerged that the final Pet Sounds session was originally intended to add vocals to "Let's Go Away for Awhile", but Capitol insisted that the session date be the only one used for the album's entire mixing.

== Reception ==
Cash Box said that it is "a moody instrumental track."

== Other releases ==
- It was included as the B-side of the Beach Boys' October 1966 single "Good Vibrations".
- It appears on the Neil Young soundtrack album Journey Through the Past as the closing track.
- It is featured on the soundtrack to the 2017 film Baby Driver.

== Personnel ==
Per archivists John Brode, Will Crerar, Joshilyn Hoisington, Craig Slowinski, and Alan Boyd.

Session musicians

- Hal Blaine – drums, wood block
- Al Casey – 12-string Guild slide guitar
- Roy Caton – trumpet
- Steve Douglas – tenor saxophone
- Jim Horn – baritone saxophone or bass saxophone
- Jules Jacob – oboe
- Plas Johnson – tenor saxophone
- Carol Kaye – Fender Precision electric bass
- Barney Kessel – Gibson acoustic rhythm guitar
- Al De Lory – Steinway grand piano
- Jay Migliori – baritone saxophone or bass saxophone
- Lyle Ritz – upright bass
- Julius Wechter – timpani, vibraphone

The Sid Sharp Strings

- Arnold Belnick – violin
- Joseph Di Fiore – viola
- Justin Di Tullio – cello
- James Getzoff – violin
- Harry Hyams – viola
- William Kurasch – violin
- Leonard Malarsky – violin
- Jerome Reisler – violin
- Joseph Saxon – cello
- Sid Sharp – violin
- Ralph Schaeffer – violin
- Tibor Zelig – violin

Technical staff

- Brian Wilson – producer
- Chuck Britz – engineer
- Bowen David – assistant engineer

== Cover versions ==
- 1995 – Sean Macreavy, Dumb Angel
- 1998 – John McEntire, Smiling Pets
- 2002 – Brian Wilson, Pet Sounds Live
- 2012 – Neil Cowley Trio, MOJO Presents Pet Sounds Revisited
- 2013 – Fairmont, Mint 400 Records Presents The Beach Boys Pet Sounds
- 2023 – nelson., Summer Dreams
