= Be True to Your School =

- Swedish picture sleeve

Single by the Beach Boys

from the album Little Deuce Coupe
- B-side: "In My Room"
- Released: October 28, 1963
- Recorded: September 1963
- Genre: Pop rock
- Length: 2:10
- Label: Capitol
- Songwriters: Brian Wilson; Mike Love
- Producer: Brian Wilson

The Beach Boys singles chronology
"Surfer Girl" (1963)	"Be True to Your School" (1963)	"Little Saint Nick" (1963)

"Be True to Your School" is a song by the American rock band the Beach Boys from their 1963 album Little Deuce Coupe. Written by Brian Wilson and Mike Love, it was issued as a single on October 28, 1963. There are two versions of this song: the album version, and the single version, which added cheerleader yells by the girl group The Honeys in between verses. The song features the melody of the University of Wisconsin's fight song, "On, Wisconsin!", although it is a tribute to Hawthorne High School, which the Wilson brothers and Al Jardine attended. Hawthorne High School's fight song uses the same melody as "On, Wisconsin!".

The cover photo for this single (and for the associated album Little Deuce Coupe) included member David Marks but not Al Jardine, though Jardine had returned to create a six-member band for the recording sessions for this single and album. This single, with its B-side "In My Room", were the last two of eight charting Beach Boys songs to include Marks in the 1960s.

== Personnel ==
=== Single version ===
The Beach Boys

- Mike Love – lead vocals, handclaps
- Brian Wilson – backing vocals, handclaps
- Al Jardine – backing vocals, handclaps
- David Marks – backing vocals, handclaps
- Carl Wilson – backing vocals, handclaps, guitar
- Dennis Wilson – backing vocals, handclaps

Additional musicians

- The Honeys (Marilyn Wilson, Diane Rovell, Ginger Blake) – backing vocals

unknown – guitar, bass, keyboards, drums, saxophones, percussion

=== Album version ===
- Mike Love – lead vocals
- Brian Wilson – backing vocals, piano, organ
- Al Jardine – backing vocals, bass
- David Marks – rhythm guitar
- Carl Wilson – backing vocals, lead guitar
- Dennis Wilson – backing vocals, drums

== Chart history ==
Weekly charts

Chart (1963–1964)	Peak position
Australia	78
Canada (CHUM Chart)	4
New Zealand (Lever Hit Parade)	3
Sweden	6
U.S. Billboard Hot 100	6
U.S. Cash Box Top 100	8
US Hot R&B Singles (Billboard)	27

Year-end charts

Chart (1964)	Rank
U.S. Cash Box	69

== Covers and later versions ==
- 1964 – The Knights, Hot Rod High
- 1985 – Jan & Dean, Silver Summer.

== In popular culture ==
- The song is featured in an episode of Gilmore Girls, where the town troubadour (portrayed by Grant-Lee Phillips) is playing it during a pep rally.
- DTV, in 1984, set the original Beach Boys version of the song to a collection of Disney shorts including some featuring schools like Teachers Are People, Toot, Whistle, Plunk and Boom and The Legend of Sleepy Hollow.
- The song is played during the title sequence of the 1988 dark comedy Mortuary Academy.
- The song's title is parodied by heavy metal band Twisted Sister in the song "Be Crool to Your Scuel".
- Mike Love performed the song on a telethon on the Full House episode "Our Very First Telethon"; while the title of a later episode, "Be True to Your Preschool", is a reference to the song.
- The song is featured in the 1980s TV series Riptide. The song is also the title of the episode (season 2, episode 7).
- The song inspired the Ripped Pants song from the SpongeBob SquarePants episode "Ripped Pants”.
- The song was part of an oldies melody in the 2005 Tokyo Disneyland parade/show "Disney's Rock Around the Mouse".
- The song is featured in the end credits of the HBO series Vice Principals, season 1, episode 1.
- Grace Vanderwaal sings the song in the 2020 Disney+ movie Stargirl. It is also included on the soundtrack for the movie.
- The song was featured on a 1993 Sony Kids' Music album called Camp California, Where the Music Never Ends.
- The song was used in a Macy's contest and commercial in 2014.
