= Sportsguitar =

- Origin: Lucerne, Switzerland
- Genres: Lo-fi; Alternative rock Indie
- Years active: 1993–present
- Labels: Our Own Records; Sub Pop Records; Matador Records; Tudor Records; Glow Music
- Members: Oliver Obert
- Past members: Roland Saum

Sportsguitar is a Swiss band formed in Lucerne in 1993. The band is centered on singer and guitarist Oliver Obert and guitarist Roland Saum, though Saum left Sportsguitar after their third album. Little is known of the contemporary activities of the band, as they for instance have never had a working website. However, Sportsguitar has so far released five albums and made some fuzz on the indie scene with their guitar-based, melodic, and naïve, yet profound lo-fi inspired by bands like Pavement and Television among others.

When Sportsguitar themselves had released the first album on their own label, Sub Pop Records put out a Sportsguitar 7" vinyl. The band was then signed by well-known independent label Matador Records which released their second and third albums.

== Discography ==
Single

- Gong Gong/Tits – (1995, Sub Pop Records, 7" single)

Albums

- Fade/Cliché – (1995, Our Own Records / 1996 Derivative Records)
- Married, 3 Kids – (1997, Matador Records)
- Happy Already – (1998, Matador Records)
- Surface – (2000, Glow Music)
- Cicadas' Chirping – (2003, Glow Music/Tudor Records)
