= In My Room =

1963 song performed by The Beach Boys

Single by the Beach Boys

from the album Surfer Girl
- A-side: "Be True to Your School"
- Released: October 28, 1963
- Recorded: July 16, 1963
- Genre: Doo-wop; pop
- Length: 2:11
- Label: Capitol
- Songwriters: Brian Wilson; Gary Usher
- Producer: Brian Wilson

The Beach Boys singles chronology
"Surfer Girl" (1963)	"Be True to Your School" / "In My Room" (1963)	"Little Saint Nick" (1963)

"In My Room" is a song written by Brian Wilson and Gary Usher for the American rock band the Beach Boys. It was released on their 1963 album Surfer Girl. It was also released as the B-side of the "Be True to Your School" single. The single peaked at number 23 on the US Billboard Hot 100 (the A-side peaked at number 6, for a two-sided top-40) and was eventually inducted into the Grammy Hall of Fame in 1999. "In My Room" was ranked number 212 on Rolling Stone's list of The 500 Greatest Songs of All Time.

== Composition ==
The song is written in the key of B major and features a flat VII A major chord.

Gary Usher explained that

"In My Room" found us taking our craft a little more seriously. Brian and I came back to the house one night after playing 'over-the-line' (a baseball game). I played bass and Brian was on organ. The song was written in an hour ... Brian's melody all the way. The sensitivity ... the concept meant a lot to him. When we finished, it was late, after our midnight curfew. In fact, Murry [the Wilson brothers' father] came in a couple of times and wanted me to leave. Anyway, we got Audree [the Wilson brothers' mother], who was putting her hair up before bed, and we played it for her. She said, "That's the most beautiful song you've ever written." Murry said, "Not bad, Usher, not bad," which was the nicest thing he ever said to me.

Usher further describes that "Brian was always saying that his room was his whole world." Brian Wilson seconds this opinion: "I had a room, and I thought of it as my kingdom. And I wrote that song, very definitely, that you're not afraid when you're in your room. It's absolutely true."

In 1990, Wilson wrote,

I also enjoyed producing "In My Room". There is a story behind this song. When Dennis, Carl and I lived in Hawthorne as kids, we all slept in the same room. One night I sang the song "Ivory Tower" to them and they liked it. Then a couple of weeks later, I proceeded to teach them both how to sing the harmony parts to it. It took them a little while, but they finally learned it. We then sang this song night after night. It brought peace to us. When we recorded "In My Room", there was just Dennis, Carl and me on the first verse ... and we sounded just like we did in our bedroom all those nights. This story has more meaning than ever since Dennis' death.

== Demo version and final release ==
The 1993 CD box set, Good Vibrations: Thirty Years of The Beach Boys, contains an early version of "In My Room" with a number of differences from the eventual official release. It is unclear if this fully developed demo was recorded the same day as the final version on July 16, 1963. The tune features six Beach Boys: both Al Jardine (on vocals) and David Marks (whose guitar strumming backs up Carl Wilson's picked solo notes) are present. This was the last of eight charting songs to include Marks until nearly 50 years later, performing on 2012's "That's Why God Made the Radio".

The demo begins with an intro that was later scrapped, and launches into the first verse with full group vocals, unlike the finished recording. There, as previously mentioned, the single brings in Brian Wilson's voice first, then his brother Carl Wilson and finally Dennis Wilson. Then the final version adds, in the title/hook, Al Jardine, and Mike Love's bass voicing which both join in to complete the vocal mix.

The Beach Boys also recorded a German version of the song under the title "Ganz allein" ("All alone"), with lyrics written by a former German girlfriend of Mike Love's. The German version was first released on the 1983 album Rarities, and later as a bonus track on the 1990 and 2001 CD re-releases of the Surfer Girl album.

== Reception ==
Cash Box described it as "a tearful, oh-so-smooth ballad."

== Charts ==
"In My Room" remained on the Billboard Hot 100 for 11 weeks, peaking at #23 in 1963. In the UPI (United Press International) weekly survey it was #17 nationally, upheld by its widespread success across the country wherever it was treated as an A-side:

- #1 in Boston and Seattle
- #2 San Francisco;
- Top 10 Washington, D.C., Houston, Minneapolis, Pittsburgh, Columbus.

Rolling Stone named it #212 on its list of greatest songs of all-time.

== Certifications ==
Certifications for "In My Room"
Region	Certification	Certified units/sales
United States (RIAA)	Gold	500,000^{‡}
^{^} Shipments figures based on certification alone.^{‡} Sales+streaming figures based on certification alone.

== Recognition and later versions ==
- David Crosby of The Byrds and Crosby, Stills & Nash (and Young) admitted to being an admirer of the song, quoting "'In My Room' was the defining point for me. When I heard it, I thought 'I give up—I can't do that—I'll never be able to do that.'" He recorded it as a trio with Jimmy Webb and Carly Simon at the An All-Star Tribute to Brian Wilson concert in 2001.
- A remake by Gary Usher's own band, Sagittarius from their album The Blue Marble, peaked at #86 in 1969.
- Wilson Phillips included their version of the song as the closing track to their 2004 studio album California. This version includes vocals by Brian Wilson, the father of group members Carnie and Wendy Wilson.
- Grant Lee Buffalo performed a cover of "In My Room" for "The One with the List", a season 2 episode of the American sitcom Friends in 1995. The song was included in the official soundtrack album of the show.
- Tammy Wynette's last recording was "In My Room", a duet with Brian Wilson. It was featured as the last track on the album Tammy Wynette Remembered released in September 1998 on Asylum Records.
- Jacob Collier's cover of "In My Room" was the title track to his debut album released in 2016.
- Los Straitjackets released an instrumental version on May 1, 2020, in recognition of the Coronavirus pandemic.
- Brian Wilson performed a solo piano version of this, his own song, on his album At My Piano in 2021.

== Personnel ==
Partial credits sourced from Craig Slowinski.

- Brian Wilson – lead vocals, organ, bass
- Mike Love – backing vocals
- Carl Wilson – backing vocals, guitar
- Dennis Wilson – backing vocals, drums
- Al Jardine – backing vocals
- David Marks – guitar
- Maureen Love – harp
- Hal Blaine – triangle, wood block or temple block
