= I'm Waiting for the Day =

1966 song by the Beach Boys

- 1967 Italian Single

Song by the Beach Boys

from the album Pet Sounds
- Released: May 16, 1966
- Recorded: March–April 1966
- Studio: Western and Columbia, Hollywood
- Genre: Rock
- Length: 3:07
- Label: Capitol
- Composer: Brian Wilson
- Lyricists: Brian Wilson; Mike Love
- Producer: Brian Wilson

Licensed audio
- "I'm Waiting for the Day" on YouTube

Audio sample
- file; help

"I'm Waiting for the Day" is a song by the American rock band the Beach Boys from their 1966 album Pet Sounds. Written primarily by Brian Wilson, the lyrics describe a man who is "waiting for the day" when the woman he loves will be ready to commit to a relationship with him. Wilson, alongside co-author Mike Love, are the only Beach Boys who appear on the recording.

Musically, the arrangement is characterized for its dynamic use of textures and word painting. Wilson produced the track in March 1966 with the aid of 17 studio musicians who variously played timpani, bongos, drums, flutes, English horn, electric guitar, two basses, strings, and an altered tack piano.

== Background and lyrics ==
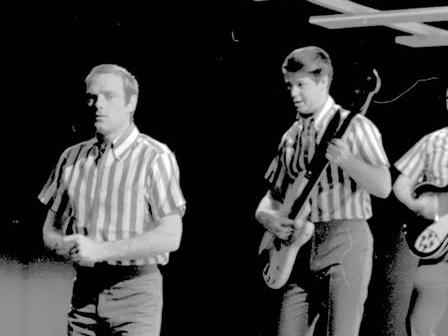
Mike Love and Brian Wilson in 1964

"I'm Waiting for the Day" was copyrighted by Wilson as a solo composition in February 1964. When the song was published on Pet Sounds, it was credited to Wilson and Mike Love, who revised eight words in Wilson's original lyric. Asked in 2014 about the song, Wilson said that "there really was no specific inspiration".

The song is a simple love poem whose narrator wishes to offer his comfort and support to a girl who was abandoned by her former lover. The narrator feels that she is "the only one" for him, and that he holds the power to "set [her] broken heart free". However, the broken-hearted girl is reluctant to commit herself to another relationship, leading the narrator to pledge, "I'm waiting for the day when you can love again". Biographer Peter Ames Carlin summarizes the song as a "relatively hard-rocking" tune about "love's restorative power". Musicologist James Perone notes,

It is the story of friends who become lovers; however, at the point in time of the song, they seem to be in a nebulous area somewhere between the two states. Therefore, while the sentiments are more optimistic than those of some of the lyrics on Pet Sounds, the listener can still sense some of the unease of Wilson's character. He may be hopeful, but he is not quite where he wants to be.

It is one of the five (of 13) tracks on the LP that Wilson did not write in conjunction with lyricist Tony Asher. (Note: It is also one of only two tracks that Wilson wrote with a collaborator other than Asher, sharing the distinction with "I Know There's an Answer".) In his 2003 book about Pet Sounds, Charles Granata refers to "I'm Waiting for the Day" as a "a sensational reminder of the smart songs" Love had co-authored with Wilson on the 1965 album The Beach Boys Today!.

== Composition ==
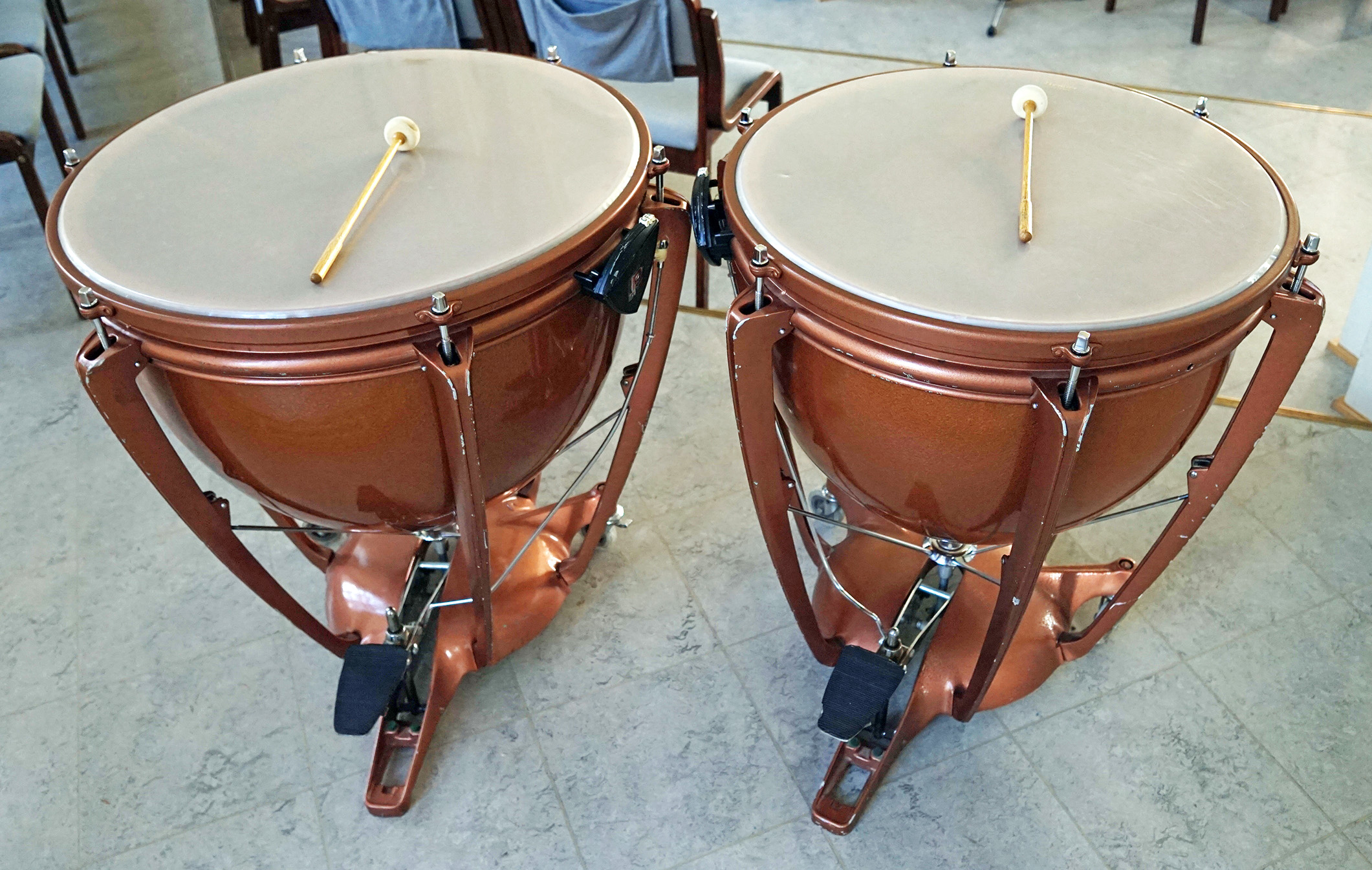
Timpanis serve a prominent part in the song's arrangement.

"I'm Waiting for the Day" has a verse-refrain structure and AAAB form. It is in the key of E major, and is one of only five tracks on Pet Sounds that does not modulate or waver into other keys. (Note: The other four tracks are "You Still Believe in Me", "Sloop John B", "I Know There's an Answer" and "I Just Wasn't Made for These Times".) Although slower in the choruses, the verses contain the fastest tempos heard on the album (approximately 168 beats per minute). According to Granata, the song serves as another example of Wilson's use of "metaphoric instrumentation", this time to bolster the themes of "commitment and strength" elaborated in the lyrics.

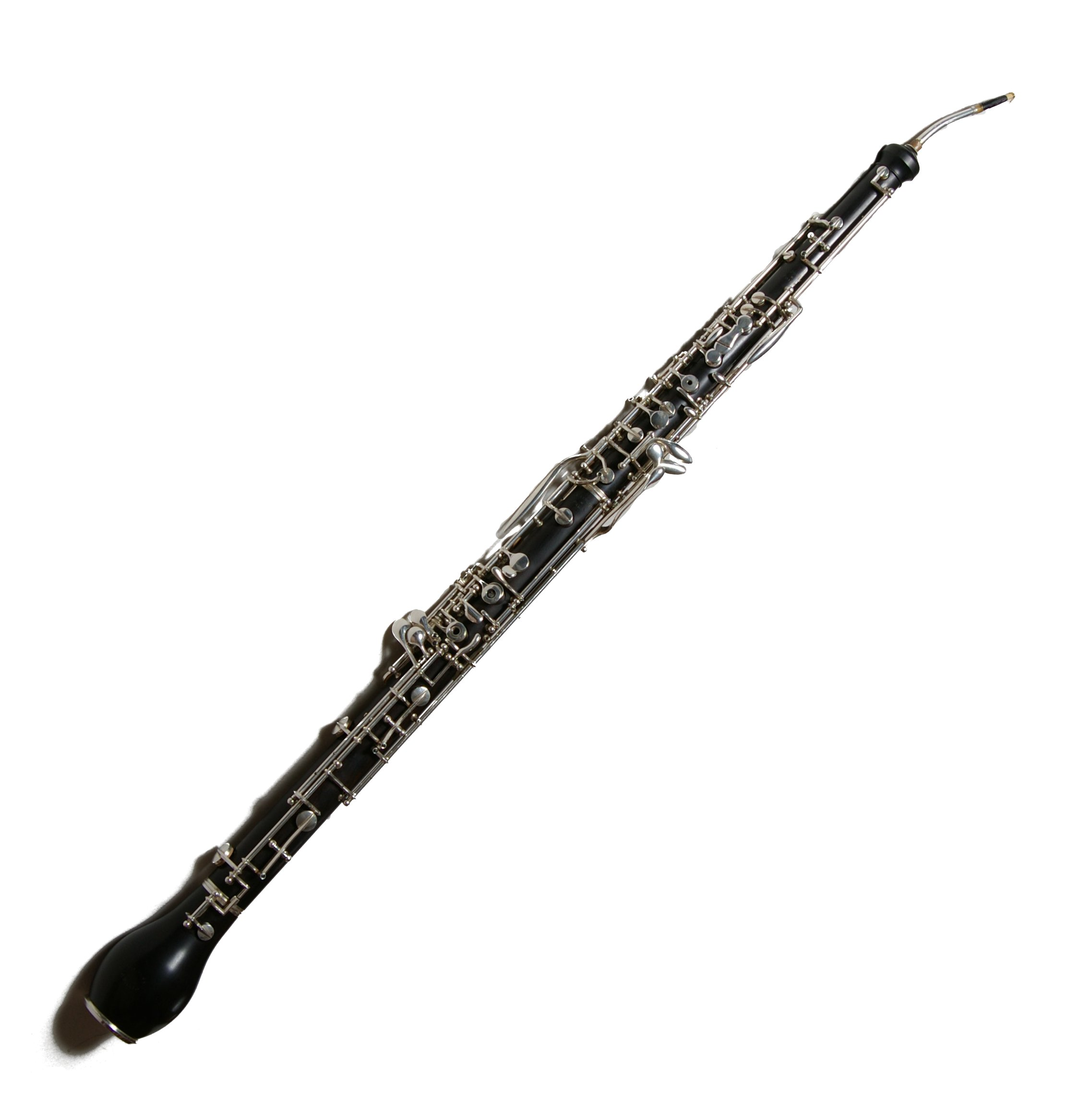
An English horn was used to double the song's lead vocal melody line.

The song opens and ends with the heavy sounds of a timpani being struck, which reduces in intensity during other sections. Lambert says that the timpani is evocative of "a throbbing, aching heart" and is "soon joined by other instruments and a brief statement of an inverted arch figure in the flute" which recurs later in the piece. In the verses, the lead vocal melody is doubled by an English horn. In Granata's belief, this English horn amplifies the song's restless feeling by suggesting "a sense of longing when voiced behind Brian's lead vocal ('I came along when he broke your heart'), and resignation in the final chorus ('I'm waiting for the day when you can love again')."

Chord-wise, the changes in the verses are essentially a doo-wop progression that gives way to the same progression Wilson had previously used in "The Man with All the Toys" (1964). (Note: The line "a big man in a chair / and little tiny men everywhere" compared with "but when I could I give I gave strength to you / I'm waiting for the day".)

The second verse introduces backing vocals singing the same melody that the flutes play in the intro. Bruce Johnston alluded to the nonsense-syllable bass vocals, a part of the backing harmonies, as an example of the "tremendous amount of doo-wop and R&B influence sprinkled throughout Pet Sounds." Of this song, he said that there are "beautiful, dumb background parts. The yin-yang works great there. The 'doops' and the 'aahs.' It's kind of like having all the scruffy characters that are in [the musical] Oliver show up at the Royal Albert Hall. They don't belong but it fits."

Preceding the final chorus is a sudden short interlude featuring just a string section as accompaniment. Granata compares the section to the previous track, "Don't Talk (Put Your Head on My Shoulder)", which similarly emphasizes the stringed instruments' lower register. He writes, "In this seven-second passage we glimpse Brian's refined musical sense, and his predilection for taking us by surprise. Here, the theme is arbitrary—it isn't voiced anywhere else in the song. In this short section, the string ensemble sweeps through an interesting sequence of 10 chords, none of which repeat." Lambert characterizes those chords as "intensely chromatic" with "internal moving lines of extraordinary intricacy".

Carol Kaye, who played 12-string electric guitar on the track, commented of the bass line, "[That] part with the 4th (sus 11th) on the bottom. Very rare! Brian really stretched his orchestrating there, but it's fine. This was a little boring to play without a lead...sort of like Beethoven, the bass wound up playing scale-like figures to a march time, ending a jazz-like chordal spread of violin and cellos."

== Recording ==
Wilson produced the basic track, including string overdubs, on March 6, 1966 at Western Recorders Studio 3. The song was then logged as "Untitled Ballad". Vocal overdubs finished the track on March 10 (or possibly March 10–12) at Columbia Studio A. Wilson and Love, who both sang vocals, are the only Beach Boys who perform on the recording. A discarded alternate mix, created on March 12, featured only Love on lead vocals.

== Critical reception ==
On May 16, 1966, "I'm Waiting for the Day" was released as the fifth track on Pet Sounds. In his self-described "unbiased" review of the album for Record Mirror, Norman Jopling described the song as an exhibition for "shotgun drums ... strings and organ, but used completely different [from 'Don't Talk'] ... it suddenly develops into a thumpy heartbeating noise, which is the introduction for Brian Wilson to throw in everything including the proverbial kitchen sink, and presumably the washing up water..."

Wilson felt that his singing on "I'm Waiting for the Day" was inadequate, explaining, "Vocally, I thought I sounded a little bit weird in my head. That's the one cut off the album I didn't really like that much. But, you know, it's okay, it's not a case of liking or not liking it; it was an appropriate song, a very, very positive song. I just didn't like my voice on that particular song." His brother Carl praised the dynamics, saying, "The intro is very big, then it gets quite small with the vocal in the verse with a little instrumentation and then, in the chorus, it gets very big again, with the background harmonies against the lead. It is perhaps one of the most dynamic moments in the album."

== Live performances ==
In 1974 and 1975, the Beach Boys incorporated "I'm Waiting for the Day" in their concert set lists.

== Personnel ==
Per archivists John Brode, Will Crerar, Joshilyn Hoisington and Craig Slowinski.

The Beach Boys

- Mike Love – bass and backing vocals
- Brian Wilson – lead and backing vocals
- Carl Wilson – backing vocals (mono mix only)

Session musicians (also known as "the Wrecking Crew")

- Jim Gordon – drums
- Gary Coleman – timpani
- Bill Green – flute
- Leonard Hartman – English horn
- Jim Horn – flute
- Carol Kaye – 12-string electric guitar
- Larry Knechtel – Hammond B3 organ
- Al De Lory – acoustic grand piano with taped strings
- Jay Migliori – flute
- Ray Pohlman – 6-string electric bass guitar
- Lyle Ritz – upright bass, overdubbed arco upright bass

The Sid Sharp Strings

- Justin DiTullio – cello
- Harry Hyams – viola
- William Kurasch – violin
- Leonard Malarsky – violin
- Ralph Schaeffer – violin
- Sid Sharp – violin

Technical staff

- Bowen David – engineer (Western)
- Bill Brittan – console engineer (Columbia)
- Ralph Valentin – console engineer (Columbia)
- Pete Romano – recording engineer (Columbia)

== Cover versions ==
- 1966 – Peanut, 7" single (arranged/produced by Mark Wirtz)
- 1998 – Short Hair Front, Smiling Pets
- 2001 – Reigning Sound, Break Up, Break Down
- 2002 – Brian Wilson, Pet Sounds Live

== Bibliography ==
- Badman, Keith (2004). The Beach Boys: The Definitive Diary of America's Greatest Band, on Stage and in the Studio. Backbeat Books. ISBN 978-0-87930-818-6.
- Carlin, Peter Ames (2006). Catch a Wave: The Rise, Fall, and Redemption of the Beach Boys' Brian Wilson. Rodale. ISBN 978-1-59486-320-2.
- Doe, Andrew; Tobler, John (2009). "The Beach Boys – Pet Sounds – May 1966". In Charlesworth, Chris (ed.). 25 Albums that Rocked the World. Omnibus Press. ISBN 978-0-85712-044-1.
- Fusilli, Jim (2005). Beach Boys' Pet Sounds. Bloomsbury Publishing. ISBN 978-1-4411-1266-8.
- Granata, Charles L. (2003). Wouldn't It Be Nice: Brian Wilson and the Making of the Beach Boys' Pet Sounds. A Cappella Books. ISBN 9781556525070.
- Lambert, Philip (2007). Inside the Music of Brian Wilson: the Songs, Sounds, and Influences of the Beach Boys' Founding Genius. Continuum. ISBN 978-0-8264-1876-0.
- Lambert, Philip (March 2008). "Brian Wilson's Pet Sounds". Twentieth-Century Music. 5 (1). Cambridge University Press: 109–133. doi:10.1017/S1478572208000625. S2CID 162871617. Archived from the original on October 2, 2021.
- O'Regan, Jade Simone (2014). When I Grow Up: The Development of the Beach Boys' Sound (1962-1966) (PDF) (Thesis). Queensland Conservatorium. doi:10.25904/1912/2556.
- Perone, James E. (2012). The Album: A Guide to Pop Music's Most Provocative, Influential, and Important Creations. ABC-CLIO. ISBN 978-0-313-37907-9.
