= Pet Sounds (instrumental) =

1966 instrumental by the Beach Boys

Instrumental by the Beach Boys

from the album Pet Sounds
- Released: May 16, 1966
- Recorded: November 17, 1965
- Studio: Western, Hollywood
- Genre: Exotica
- Length: 2:38
- Label: Capitol
- Composer: Brian Wilson
- Producer: Brian Wilson

Audio sample
- file; help

"Pet Sounds" is an instrumental by the American rock band the Beach Boys from their 1966 album Pet Sounds. Composed by Brian Wilson, it was originally called "Run James Run", as Wilson intended it to be used as the theme of a James Bond film. It was then titled "Pet Sounds", the title of the album on which it appears. It is the second instrumental to feature on Pet Sounds, the other being "Let's Go Away for Awhile".

== Influences ==
The exotica piece has been compared to the work of Les Baxter and Martin Denny for its reverberated bongos and güiro combined with pervasive horns and a Latin rhythm. MOJO declared it an "ambiguous, jet-age update of Martin Denny-style 1950s exotica." Speaking about the piece in his 2016 memoir, Wilson stated: "I loved Thunderball, which had come out the year before, and I loved listening to composers like Henry Mancini, who did these cool themes for shows like Peter Gunn, and Les Baxter, who did all these big productions that sounded sort of like Phil Spector productions." When asked if he was a fan of Denny and exotica music in a 2017 phone interview, he responded: "No, I never get the chance to listen to them. Never did."

== Recording ==
A diagram showing the key components of a Leslie speaker

It was performed by Brian and several session musicians, with no other members of the Beach Boys. The session sheet for the recording date carries the notation, "This is a working title only."

"Pet Sounds" was recorded on November 17, 1965 at United Western Recorders, with Chuck Britz engineering. The unique percussion sound heard on the track is drummer Ritchie Frost playing two empty Coca-Cola cans, at Brian's suggestion. Overdubs included bongos and two guitars filtered through a Leslie speaker.

The piece was written with the intention of using it in a James Bond film, and was originally titled "Run James Run". Another, unrelated song with this title was written and recorded by Wilson for his 2015 album No Pier Pressure, though it was not released until 2017, when it was included in the compilation Playback: The Brian Wilson Anthology.

== Personnel ==
Per band archivist Craig Slowinski.

The Beach Boys

- Brian Wilson – grand piano; producer

Session musicians

- Roy Caton – trumpet
- Jerry Cole – electric lead guitar
- Ritchie Frost – drums, bongos, Coca-Cola cans with sticks
- Bill Green – alto saxophone, guiro
- Jim Horn – bass saxophone
- Plas Johnson – tenor saxophone, tambourine
- Carol Kaye – electric bass
- Jay Migliori – baritone saxophone
- Lyle Ritz – upright bass
- Billy Strange – guitar with Leslie effect
- Tommy Tedesco – archtop acoustic rhythm guitar

== Cover versions ==
- 1992 – Dos Dragsters, Smiles, Vibes & Harmony: A Tribute to Brian Wilson
- 2000 – Peter Thomas Sound Orchestra, Caroline Now!
- 2002 – Brooks Williams, Making God Smile
- 2003 – Tsuyoshi Kawakami, Moodmakers Mood
- 2005 – The Angry String Orchestra, String Quartet Tribute to Beach Boys' Pet Sounds
- 2006 – Architecture in Helsinki, Do It Again: A Tribute to Pet Sounds
- 2012 – Human Don't Be Angry, MOJO Presents Pet Sounds Revisited
- 2013 – The Duke of Norfolk, Mint 400 Records Presents The Beach Boys Pet Sounds
