= I Know There's an Answer =

1966 song by the Beach Boys

Song by the Beach Boys

from the album Pet Sounds
- Released: May 16, 1966
- Recorded: February 9 – April 17, 1966
- Studio: Western, Hollywood
- Genre: Psychedelic pop
- Length: 3:08
- Label: Capitol
- Songwriters: Brian Wilson; Terry Sachen; Mike Love
- Producer: Brian Wilson

Licensed audio
- "I Know There's an Answer" on YouTube

Audio sample
- file; help

"I Know There's an Answer" (alternately known as "Hang On to Your Ego") is a song by American rock band the Beach Boys from their 1966 album Pet Sounds. Written by Brian Wilson, Terry Sachen, and Mike Love, the song was inspired by Wilson's experience with the drug LSD and his struggle with ego death. Musically, it is distinguished for its colorful arrangement, unorthodox structure, and bass harmonica solo. The instrumentation also includes guitars, tambourine, tack piano, banjo, clarinets, flutes, electric keyboards, bass harmonica, and timpani. Wilson, Love, and Al Jardine trade the lead vocal, for which the melody spans two octaves.

The subject matter was unusual for rock music of the era. Originally titled "Let Go of Your Ego", Love refused to sing the first draft of lyrics, recalling that they had promoted the use of LSD. After voicing his objections, Wilson allowed him to revise the song's message to be about finding meaning within oneself and allowing others to live as they wish, despite having reservations against those who abuse LSD as a form of escapism.

Love was not granted an official writing credit for his contributions to both "I Know There's an Answer" and "Hang On to Your Ego" until 1994. An earlier mix of the song, featuring the group singing the "Hang On to Your Ego" lyric revision, was released as a bonus track on the album's 1990 CD reissue. Session highlights were released on the 1993 box set Good Vibrations. Further highlights from the vocal sessions were released on the 2016 box set reissue of Pet Sounds.

Cover versions of "I Know There's an Answer" have been recorded by artists such as Sonic Youth and the Pixies' Frank Black, the latter using the "Hang On to Your Ego" lyric.

== Background ==
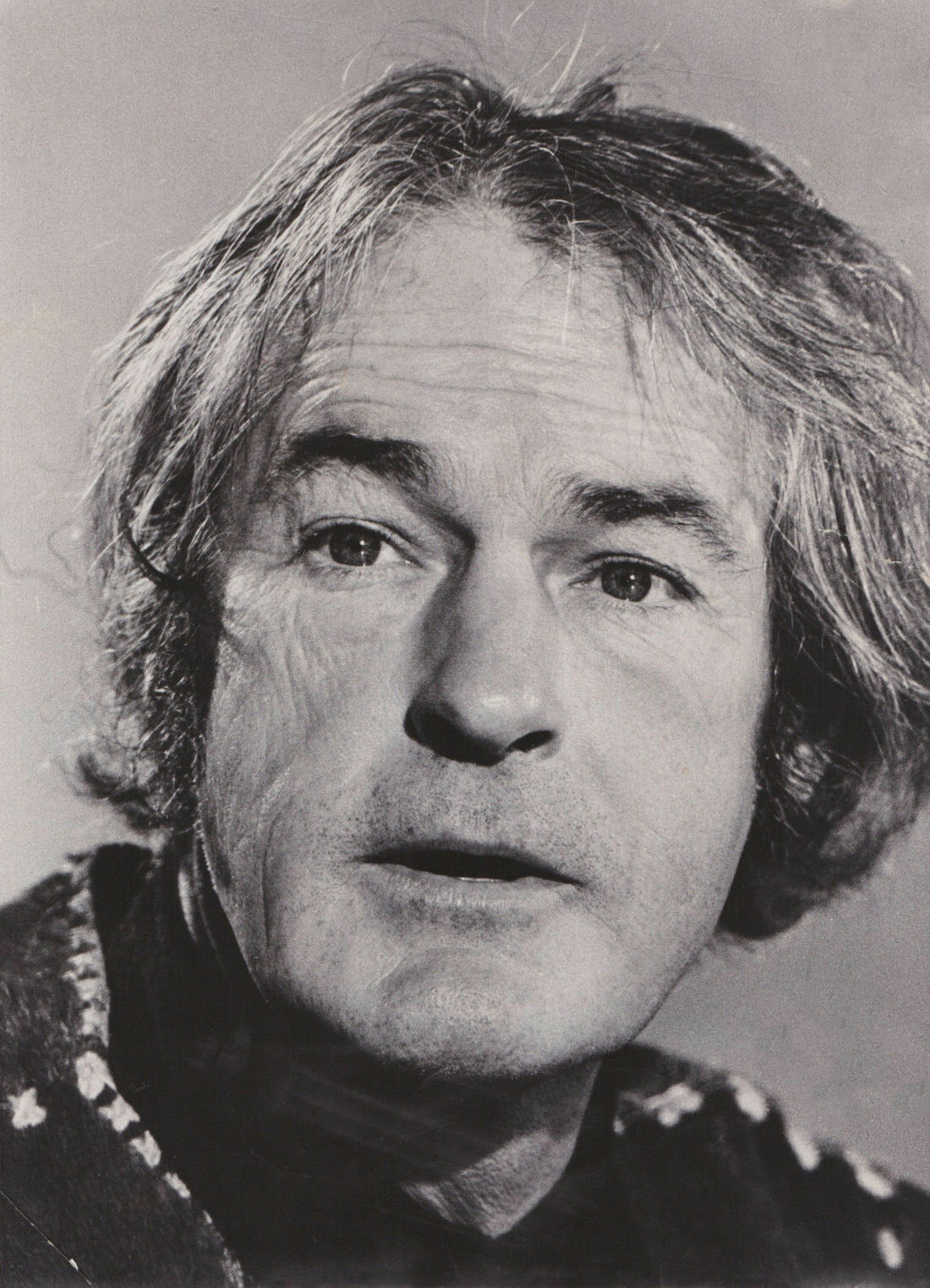
According to journalist Tom Nolan in 1966, Wilson felt he "can't go along" with LSD advocates such as Timothy Leary (pictured), noting that they "talk a lot, but ... don't really create".

Originally conceived as "Let Go of Your Ego", the song was first written by Brian Wilson and Terry Sachen; the latter had been hired as the band's road manager in January 1965. Wilson was inspired to write the song following his experience with the drug LSD (or "acid"). Loren Schwartz, a talent agent who supervised Wilson's first LSD trip, recalled that Wilson had achieved "full-on ego death" through the drug. Explaining Sachen's background, Schwartz wrote that Sachen had met Wilson through Wilson's younger cousins. "Terry ingratiated himself with Brian by supplying him with marijuana, hashish and tempting him with other substances."

LSD first became a widely available street drug in early 1965. Wilson was fascinated by the drug at the time, having had what he called a "religious experience" on the occasion that he used it, but was less enamored with many of the so-called "acid heads". His 2016 memoir, I Am Brian Wilson, stated of the song: "People took [acid] to get away from themselves, but that wasn't the right way to take it. It was supposed to make you go deeper into yourself. I wanted to remind people that they could survive everything best if they remembered who they were." (Note: The memoir goes on to say that he had only taken LSD once to this point.)

Having predated Wilson's collaboration with Tony Asher for the Pet Sounds album, it is one of the five (of 13) tracks on the LP that the pair did not write together. (Note: It is also one of only two tracks that Wilson wrote with a collaborator other than Asher, sharing the distinction with "I'm Waiting for the Day".) Asher recalled, "Brian startled me one afternoon by saying 'Oh listen—I just wrote a song with Terry.' I listened to it and said to myself, 'You mean I'm not writing all the songs for the album?' ... I didn't feel betrayed—I was just surprised."

== Controversy and rewrite ==
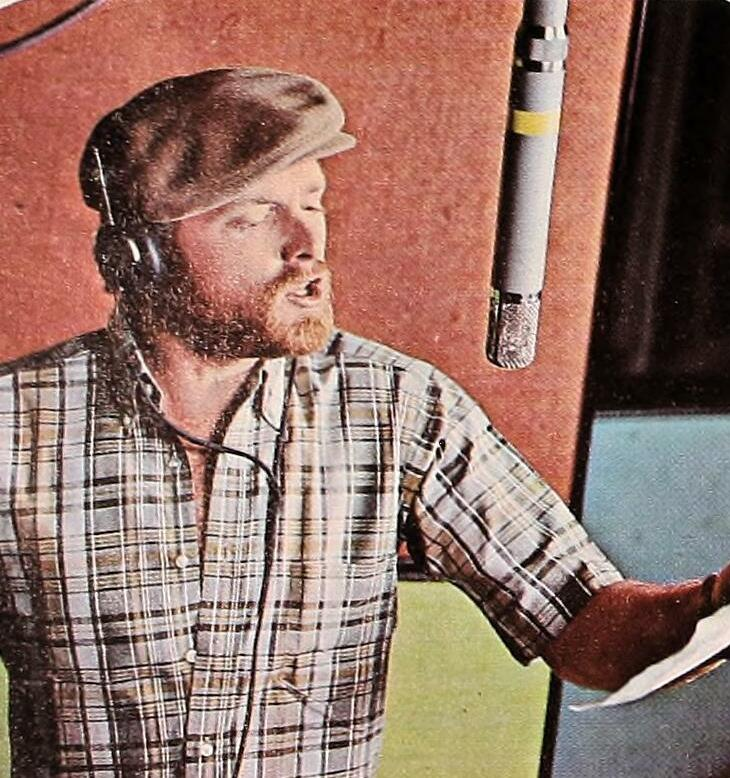
Mike Love took issue with the original draft of lyrics, titled "Let Go of Your Ego", and requested a rewrite

The song was rewritten after Mike Love voiced objections to the lyrics. Love stated in a 1993 interview that he found the original lyrics "so totally offensive [and] nauseating" that he refused to sing them. He told Wilson that he was strongly opposed to drugs such as LSD and did not wish for the Beach Boys to be associated with its culture. In his recollection, he was aware of the fact that Wilson had experimented with LSD and knew that the "prevailing drug jargon [suggested] that doses of LSD would shatter your ego, as if that were a positive thing... I wasn't interested in taking acid or getting rid of my ego." He said, "The people that I'd seen indulge in those things exhibited behaviors and mannerisms that left much to be desired."

Al Jardine recalled that "Brian was very concerned" and asked the rest of the band for their opinions: "To be honest, I don't think we even knew what an ego was ... Finally Brian decided, 'Forget it. I'm changing the lyrics. There's too much controversy.'" Love said that "Brian didn't balk" at his proposed lyric changes. "Maybe he cared, maybe he didn't. He never said anything to me directly." In a 2007 interview, Wilson said he "didn't mind" changing the lyrics, "But you know what? The ego of the band was Mike. He was the ego guy." When the song was published, Wilson neglected to credit Love as a co-writer. In 1994, Love successfully sued for writing credits on 35 Beach Boys songs, including "I Know There's an Answer". (Note: Love was also awarded credit for "Hang On to Your Ego", which, if counted, would boost the number to 36.)

However, session tape evidence directly contradicts these claims by showing that Al was in fact the one who was getting nervous about the initial lyric draft, and also reveals Brian’s support for Mike’s lyrical revisions to the track.

In retrospect, Jardine said of the dispute, "It's funny...Now, it seems like no big deal; it just seemed like it at the time." Bruce Johnston felt it was not "one of my favorite songs. I remember recording it as 'Hang On To Your Ego,' and it just never, ever felt right to me either way. I was more interested in the harmonicas and the double bass."

== Lyrics ==
The song was renamed to "Hang On to Your Ego". At this juncture, the lyrics referenced acid-induced ego death and advised users of LSD to be wary of the drug's effects on the mind. The narrator also expressed a frustration with the self-centeredness of others and urged those who use psychedelics as escapism—like himself—to "hang on to" their ego, even though he believes that they are unable to. In the interpretation of author Donald Brackett, the song warned against "losing touch with one reality through effortless chemistry while coming closer to another one through the determined effort of talent", in other words, "don't let your identity be melted away during your search for enlightenment. It's an artificial paradise, [the narrator] cautions, since as Jack Kerouac once remarked, enlightenment wasn't built in a day!"

Wilson's then-wife Marilyn attributed an autobiographical quality to the piece. Like most songs on Pet Sounds, she believed that Wilson was writing about his frustrations relating "to life and how people think ... musically or intellectually or whatever". Asked if "Hang On to Your Ego" was based on his struggles in maintaining his ego, Wilson responded: "Yeah. I had taken a few drugs, and I had gotten into that kind of thing. I guess it just came up naturally." He later said that it had been "an inappropriate lyric. ... I just thought that to say 'Hang on to your ego' was an ego statement in and of itself, which I wasn't going for, so I changed it. I gave it a lot of thought."

After being renamed again, now as "I Know There's an Answer", the song was altered to describe the protagonist's hesitation to tell the self-centered how they can improve their lifestyle. In the verses, "how can I come on when I know I'm guilty" was modified to "how can I come on and tell them the way that they live could be better". Elsewhere, in the choruses, "Hang on to your ego, hang on but I know that you're going to lose the fight" was changed to "I know there's an answer, I know but I have to find it by myself". Most of the other lyrics stayed the same, and despite concerns over the song's drug references, the key line "they trip through the day and waste all their thoughts at night" was kept.

Love said that his revisions were an attempt to reflect the more "positive message" of "finding yourself". Wilson supported this message; asked in an interview about what the "answer" in the song was, he responded, "Your self. There is an answer for you." Although the narrator expresses pity for "uptight people" who "trip through the day", he leaves them alone to live as they wish. According to musicologist Philip Lambert, the revision introduced contradictions:

If the message is to "seek answers within", then the song's opening line, "I know so many people who think they can do it alone" (which Mike didn't change), no longer makes sense as an argument to be refuted. In fact, the new message contends, those people are right, they can do it alone, by recognizing their self-worth and realizing their unexplored potential.

== Composition ==
"I Know There's an Answer" is structured in a verse/refrain/verse/refrain/bridge/refrain pattern. Unusually, the verses are divided by an eight-bar A section ("I know so many people ...") and a six-bar B section ("I know there's an answer ...". According to music historian Charles Granata, "The coupling of an eight- and a six-bar passage to create a fourteen-bar verse is rare (most verses are eight, twelve, or sixteen bars long); in this case, the listener isn't aware of the verse's compositional irregularity because the tune is so well-written."

The song is in the key of B♭ and its lead melody spans two octaves. Inverted chords are used just as they are in other Pet Sounds compositions. Unlike other tracks on Pet Sounds, which modulate their respective keys down a minor third, the brief key change in "I Know There's an Answer" ascends a minor third (on the lyric "now what can you tell them"). Granata identified the "aah, di-di-di-di-da" backing vocals and Love's "ba doo-be-doo-be-dooooo" vocal break as the album's "most striking bit of doo-wop".

A bass harmonica solo, played by session musician Tommy Morgan, is featured during the instrumental break. (Note: During the session, Wilson instructed Morgan to "wail on that baby for the instrumental break. ... Try to wail. Do a thing—you know.") Morgan later commented, "Brian used instruments imaginatively. Not many people used bass harmonica at the time—Brian certainly used it before the Beatles. My solo ... was improvised, but whenever I played as part of the bass line, I played exactly what Brian told me to play."

In Lambert's estimation, "This is one of Wilson's most vibrant instrumental conceptions, featuring organ, tack piano, harpsichord [sic], banjo, guitar, and bass harmonica. More so than any other song on the album, this one celebrates instruments and instrumental colours." Session musician Carol Kaye commented, "Brian's putting us all on here with this royal 'blues' start and finally pretty song with its many facets of moods. He truly experimented on this."

== Recording ==
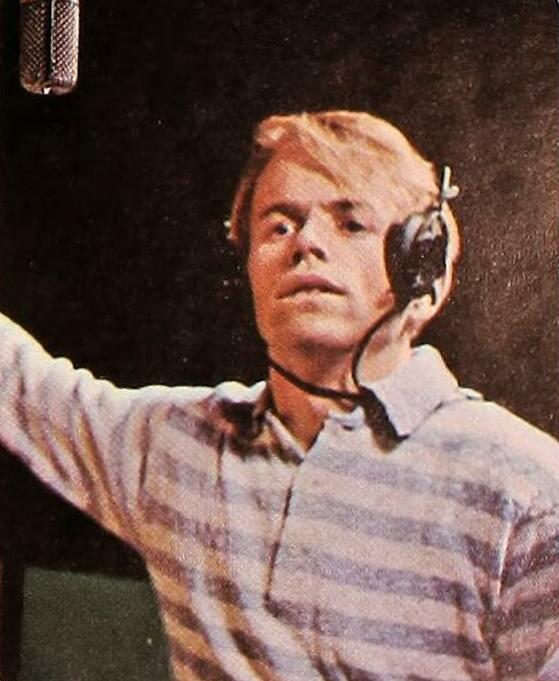
Al Jardine sang lead on "I Know There's an Answer"

Wilson produced the backing track for "I Know There's an Answer" (then slated and logged as "Let Go of Your Ego") on February 9, 1966 at Western Studio. With the exception of an overdubbed banjo and mandolin, played by Glen Campbell and Carl Wilson respectively, the track was recorded live with an orchestra of 15 musicians. Before one of the takes, Wilson jokingly referred to the song as "Let Go of Your Libido", mispronouncing "libido", after which he asked if anyone had heard the 1961 comedy album How to Speak Hip. He recorded a guide vocal for the track later that day.

Vocal overdubs followed a week later, by which time the song had been renamed to "Hang On to Your Ego".. Eventually, most of these vocals would be redone on March 3. As the session began, Love goofed around by singing the opening lines in the style of comedian Jimmy Durante and actor James Cagney. Jardine, on the other hand, was struggling with singing the vocals to Wilson's satisfaction and remarked, "Hey, Brian. This is a little tricky. ... I cannot hack this without your help. I mean it. I'm mentally destroyed." Love continued to joke around and distract Jardine, causing Wilson to lose his patience and shout through the studio intercom, "Hey, you guys. Don't fuck around. Please, we've got to do it, Mike. Come on. ... Guys, let's cut this fucking thing!" After Jardine's 14th take, Wilson announced that he had been satisfied with the performance, although Jardine felt that Wilson may have been "just accepting it". Jardine's vocal takes ultimately ran up to 18.

"Hang On to Your Ego" (mono mix from February 16, 1966)
Excerpt from an early mix of "Hang On to Your Ego" that featured a more complex vocal arrangement. Brian sang the guide vocal.

On February 16, Wilson completed a mono mix of "Hang On to Your Ego". The group later rerecorded the vocals to accommodate the song's reconfiguration as "I Know There's an Answer". The verse backing vocals and Mike’s second verse lead vocals were finished on March 3, all of Al’s lead vocals and Mike’s first verse lead vocals were done on March 22, and Brian’s final chorus lead and organ overdub were done on April 17, with all sessions taking place at Western.

== Critical reception ==
Reviewing the Pet Sounds album upon its release, Record Mirror's Norman Jopling wrote that "'I Know There's An Answer' is a bell-like item and starts off Ronette-ishly. Prominent bass, dramatic vocal work. Like 'Don't Talk', there's a strong hymnal flavour on this one, but the only complaint is that the backing dominates the vocals. Sax break [sic], which is very unusual on Beach Boy records, and tambourines galore at the end."

Retrospectively, music journalist D. Strauss remarked that "I Know There's an Answer" demonstrated how Pet Sounds made the Beach Boys "the first major rock group to look music trends firmly in the eye and declare that rock really didn't matter. Rock is supposed to be about, you know, fucking, and Brian Wilson was recording a song...that was originally entitled 'Get Rid of Your Libido.' [sic]" Consequence writer Ben Kaye described "I Know There's an Answer" as an "ode to finding yourself", while praising the harmonies and the song's unique place within the band's catalogue. In 2015, Mojo ranked it as the 20th-greatest Beach Boy song, describing it as a "fried treatise on how LSD separates the turned-on 'us' from the uptight 'them'." The same year, the French edition of Rolling Stone magazine ranked it the band's 19th greatest song.

== Personnel ==
Per sessionographers John Brode, Will Crerar, Joshilyn Hoisington, and Craig Slowinski.

The Beach Boys

- Al Jardine – lead (verse) vocals
- Mike Love – lead (verse opening line) and backing vocals
- Brian Wilson – lead (chorus) vocals, overdubbed electric organ; producer
- Carl Wilson – backing vocals and overdubbed mandolin

Session musicians (later known as "the Wrecking Crew")

- Hal Blaine – tambourine
- Glen Campbell – Mosrite Mark XII 12-string electric guitar, overdubbed resonator banjo
- Al De Lory – tack upright piano
- Steve Douglas – tambourine
- Jim Horn – clarinet
- Paul Horn – clarinet
- Bobby Klein – flute
- Barney Kessel – Danelectro Bellzouki 7010 electric 12-string guitar
- Larry Knechtel – Hammond C-3 organ
- Jay Migliori – clarinet
- Tommy Morgan – bass harmonica
- Ray Pohlman – Fender VI electric 6-string bass guitar
- Lyle Ritz – upright bass
- Julius Wechter – timpani

Technical staff

- Chuck Britz – engineer

== Frank Black version ==
"Hang On to Your Ego"

Single by Frank Black

from the album Frank Black
- Released: 1993
- Recorded: 1992
- Length: 3:23
- Label: 4AD; Elektra
- Songwriters: Brian Wilson; Terry Sachen
- Producers: Eric Drew Feldman; Frank Black

Frank Black singles chronology
| "Los Angeles" (1993) | "Hang On to Your Ego" (1993) | "Frank Black" (1993) |

Music video
- "Frank Black - Hang On To Your Ego (Official Video)" on YouTube

Credited to his moniker Frank Black, Pixies member Charles Thompson recorded a cover version of "Hang On to Your Ego" that was issued as a single from his first solo album, Frank Black (1993). It was one of the first tracks recorded for the LP, which had originally been planned as a covers album. His bandmate Joey Santiago guested on lead guitar. Pixies biographer John Mendelssohn remarked that Thompson's rendition "could be played in actual discotheques – the kind in which men in tight-fitting shirts with extremely pointed collars try to persuade women with big hair and ankle bracelets to have sex with them – without there being a stampede for the exits!"

The music video for the song was created on a budget estimated between $60,000 and $65,000. It was the second music video directed by They Might Be Giants' John Flansburgh and featured cameo appearances from Tony Asher and Charles' younger brother Parker Thompson. According to a contemporary report, "The video treatment for 'Hang On to Your Ego' juxtaposes the concept of not loving yourself too much against images of people caught in the act of self-loving, says Flansburgh. The clip combines hi-tech, pop-art effects with a low-tech video portrait inspired by amateur public-access shows."

Wilson's 2016 memoir briefly references this cover, noting his unfamiliarity with the Pixies. In 2012, Thompson's version was ranked at number 10 on Paste magazine's list of "The 25 Best Beach Boys Covers".

CD single track listing
| No. | Title | Writer(s) | Length |
|---|---|---|---|
| 1. | "Hang On to Your Ego" | Wilson, Sachen | 3:23 |
| 2. | "The Ballad of Johnny Horton" | Thompson | 4:22 |
| 3. | "Surf Epic" | Thompson | 10:12 |
| Total length: | | | 17:57 |

== Other versions ==
- 1990 – Sonic Youth, Smiles, Vibes & Harmony: A Tribute to Brian Wilson
- 1997 – The Levellers, "What a Beautiful Day" B-side
- 2002 – Aaron Sprinkle, Making God Smile
- 2005 – The Vitamin String Quartet, VSQ Performs the Beach Boys' Pet Sounds
- 2013 – The Ashes, Mint 400 Records Presents the Beach Boys Pet Sounds
- 2016 – Christian Bland & the Revelators, A Tribute to Pet Sounds

== Bibliography ==
- Badman, Keith (2004). The Beach Boys: The Definitive Diary of America's Greatest Band, on Stage and in the Studio. Backbeat Books. ISBN 978-0-87930-818-6.
- Brackett, Donald (2008). Dark Mirror: The Pathology of the Singer-songwriter. Praeger. ISBN 978-0-275-99898-1.
- Carlin, Peter Ames (2006). Catch a Wave: The Rise, Fall, and Redemption of the Beach Boys' Brian Wilson. Rodale. ISBN 978-1-59486-320-2.
- DeRogatis, Jim (1996). Kaleidoscope Eyes: Psychedelic Rock From the 1960s to the 1990s. Fourth Estate. ISBN 1-85702-599-7.
- Doe, Andrew; Tobler, John (2009). "The Beach Boys – Pet Sounds – May 1966". In Charlesworth, Chris (ed.). 25 Albums that Rocked the World. Omnibus Press. ISBN 978-0-85712-044-1.
- Fusilli, Jim (2005). Beach Boys' Pet Sounds. Bloomsbury Publishing. ISBN 978-1-4411-1266-8.
- Granata, Charles L. (2003). Wouldn't it Be Nice: Brian Wilson and the Making of the Beach Boys' Pet Sounds. Chicago Review Press. ISBN 978-1-55652-507-0.
- Lambert, Philip (2007). Inside the Music of Brian Wilson: The Songs, Sounds, and Influences of the Beach Boys' Founding Genius. Bloomsbury Publishing. ISBN 978-1-4411-0748-0.
- Lambert, Philip (March 2008). "Brian Wilson's Pet Sounds". Twentieth-Century Music. 5 (1). Cambridge University Press: 109–133. doi:10.1017/S1478572208000625. S2CID 162871617. Archived from the original on October 2, 2021.
- Love, Mike (2016). Good Vibrations: My Life as a Beach Boy. Penguin Publishing Group. ISBN 978-0-698-40886-9.
- Wilson, Brian; Greenman, Ben (2016). I Am Brian Wilson: A Memoir. Da Capo Press. ISBN 978-0-306-82307-7.
