= Van Dyke Parks discography =

- Studio albums: 7
- Live albums: 1
- Compilation albums: 3
- Singles: 11
- Production: 11

This article contains information related to recordings by American composer, arranger, producer, instrumentalist, and singer-songwriter Van Dyke Parks.

== Studio albums ==
Year	Album details
1968	Song Cycle: Released: January 1968; Label: Warner Bros.
1972	Discover America: Released: 1972; Label: Warner Bros.
1975	Clang of the Yankee Reaper: Released: 1975; Label: Warner Bros.
1984	Jump!: Released: February 1984; Label: Warner Bros.
1989	Tokyo Rose: Released: July 1989; Label: Warner Bros.
1995	Orange Crate Art: Released: October 24, 1995; Label: Warner Bros.
2013	Songs Cycled: Released: May 6, 2013; Label: Bella Union

== Live album ==
Year	Album details
1998	Moonlighting: Live at the Ash Grove: Released: February 10, 1998; Label: Warner Bros.

== Singles ==
Year	Title	Album
1966	"Number Nine" / "Do What You Wanta"	—N/a
1966	"Come to the Sunshine" / "Farther Along"	—N/a
1967	"Donovan's Colours, Pt. 1" / "Donovan's Colours, Pt. 2"	Song Cycle
1970	"The Eagle and Me" / "On the Rolling Sea When Jesus Speak to Me"	—N/a
1972	"Occapella" / "Ode to Tobago"	Discover America
2011	"Wall Street" / "Money Is King"	Songs Cycled
2011	"Dreaming of Paris" / "Wedding in Madagaskar (Faranaina)"	Songs Cycled
2012	"Black Gold" / "Aquarium"	Songs Cycled
2012	"Amazing Graces" / "Hold Back Time"	Songs Cycled
2012	"The All Golden" / "Sassafrass"	Songs Cycled
2012	"Missin' Mississippi" / "The Parting Hand"	Songs Cycled

== Compilation albums ==
Year	Title	Notes
1996	Idiosyncratic Path: Best Of Van Dyke Parks: Released: 1996; Label:	CD sold during live performances.
2011	Arrangements: Volume 1: Released: 2011; Label: Bananastan	Contains rarities and collaborative work ranging from the mid 1960s to the early 1970s.
2013	Super Chief: Music For The Silver Screen: Released: 2013; Label: Bella Union	Various film scores made by Parks compiled under the theme of his 1955 ride on the Super Chief.

== Appearances ==
Besides multiple projects with Brian Wilson, he has worked with such notable acts as Phil Ochs, Tim Buckley, Haruomi Hosono, The Byrds, Loudon Wainwright III, Rufus Wainwright, Harry Nilsson, Randy Newman, The Chills, Ry Cooder, Joanna Newsom, Grizzly Bear, Inara George, Silverchair, Daniel Johns, Keith Moon, Frank Zappa, Ringo Starr, Delaney Bramlett, Vic Chesnutt, U2, Cher, Sam Phillips, Frank Black, The Beau Brummels, The Manhattan Transfer, Medicine, Sixpence None the Richer, Carly Simon, Little Feat, T-Bone Burnett, Stan Ridgway, Toad the Wet Sprocket, Victoria Williams, Peter Case, Gordon Lightfoot, Fiona Apple, Sheryl Crow, Natalie Merchant, The Everly Brothers, Saint Etienne, The Thrills, Scissor Sisters, Laurie Anderson, Bonnie Raitt, Judy Collins, Susanna Hoffs, and Matthew Sweet.

Year	Title	Artist	Role
1966	Fifth Dimension	The Byrds	Organ on "5D (Fifth Dimension)"
1966	Tim Buckley	Tim Buckley	Session musician (celeste, harpsichord, piano)
1967	Smiley Smile	The Beach Boys	Writing
1967	Triangle	The Beau Brummels	Harpsichord, keyboards
1968	Randy Newman	Randy Newman	Producer
1970	Sit Down Young Stranger	Gordon Lightfoot	Harmonium on "Cobwebs and Dust"
1970	Greatest Hits	Phil Ochs	Producer, keyboards
1970	Ry Cooder (album)	Ry Cooder	Producer, piano
1971	Surf's Up	The Beach Boys	Writing, vocals
1972	Into the Purple Valley	Ry Cooder	Keyboards
1973	Holland	The Beach Boys	Writing
1975	Duit on Mon Dei	Harry Nilsson	Piano, synthesizer
1985	Lost in the Stars: The Music of Kurt Weill	Hal Willner	Featured performer
1987	Famous Blue Raincoat	Jennifer Warnes	Synthesizer, Accordion, Arranger
1995	Orange Crate Art	Brian Wilson & Van Dyke Parks	Primary artist
1995	Ain't Had Enough Fun	Little Feat	Accordion
2000	O Brother, Where Art Thou?	Various	The instrumental Big Rock Candy Mountain
2002	Diorama	Silverchair	Orchestral arrangements
2004	Smile	Brian Wilson	Writing
2004	Enjoy Every Sandwich: Songs of Warren Zevon	Various	Featured performer
2004	While the Music Lasts	Jesse Harris	Orchestral arrangements, featured performer
2006	Ys	Joanna Newsom	Accordion, orchestral arrangements, producer
2006	Rogue's Gallery: Pirate Ballads, Sea Songs, and Chanteys	Various	Featured performer
2006	The Harry Smith Project: Anthology of American Folk Music Revisited	Hal Willner	Featured performer
2007	Young Modern	Silverchair	Orchestral arrangements
2007	Tribute to Haruomi Hosono	Various	Featured performer
2008	An Invitation	Inara George with Van Dyke Parks	Featured performer
2008	Replica Sun Machine	The Shortwave Set	Orchestral arrangements
2009	Echo	Mari Iijima	Session musician
2009	Cool Man Cool	Grant Geissman	Session musician
2009	Walk With You	Ringo Starr	co-writer (with Richard Starkey)
2013	Clockwork	Sleeping at Last	Orchestral Arrangements
2019	¡Spangled!	Gaby Moreno & Van Dyke Parks	Songwriter, composer, and arranger
2021	Old Summer Reckoning	The Blasting Company & Van Dyke Parks	Songwriter, producer, and arranger
2022	"Emergency Calls Only" (with Daniel Johns)	FutureNever	as featured artist

== Production ==
Year	Album	Artist
1969	Randy Newman	Randy Newman
1970	Greatest Hits	Phil Ochs
1971	Esso	The Esso Trinidad Steel Band
1972	Hosono House	Haruomi Hosono
1973	HAPPY END	Happy End
1974	Hot and Sweet	Mighty Sparrow
1974	Feats Don't Fail Me Now	Little Feat
1976	Chords of Fame	Phil Ochs
1993	Switchblade of Love	Steve Young
2006	Ys	Joanna Newsom
2006	Spooked	Marley's Ghost
