= Songs Cycled =

Studio album by Van Dyke Parks
- Released: May 6, 2013
- Recorded: 1971 ("Aquarium"); 2011–2012, Santa Monica and Los Angeles, California
- Genre: Worldbeat, Americana, chamber music, indie
- Length: 46:43
- Label: Bella Union
- Producer: Van Dyke Parks, Matthew Cartsonis

Van Dyke Parks chronology
| Moonlighting: Live at the Ash Grove (1998) | Songs Cycled (2013) |

Singles from Songs Cycled
- 1. "Money Is King" / "Wall Street" Released: May 10, 2011; 2. "Dreaming of Paris" / "Wedding in Madagascar (Faranaina)" Released: May 10, 2011; 3. "Black Gold" / "Aquarium" Released: January 2012; 4. "Amazing Graces" / "Hold Back Time" Released: January 2012; 5. "The All Golden" / "Sassafrass" Released: March 2012; 6. "Missin' Missippi" / "The Parting Hand" Released: March 2012

Songs Cycled is the seventh studio album by Van Dyke Parks, released on Bella Union in 2013. It is his first of original material since 1995's Orange Crate Art. It features relatively new compositions, re-recordings, and covers by Parks.

== Background ==
Throughout 2011 and 2012, Parks began sporadically releasing a series of 7" singles through his independent record label Bananastan spanning both archives and recently recorded songs. On April 2, 2013, he announced the release of Songs Cycled on Bella Union, which would compile each single into one LP.

I realized I couldn't get bookings as a performing artist on the road, as it were, I could not make a living in music without going on the road, but I couldn't get booked without a new product. People say, "Where's your new album?" Well, I have no new album, and I'm not going to have a new album. They said, "What are you doing?" I'm performing music that I've done my entire life that I've never performed, and I'm promoting material that I haven't promoted. They have not considered that opportunity, but I decided I needed to embellish this somehow and convince people that I have a contemporary attitude that's affected by contemporary results.

— Van Dyke Parks, regarding the album's conception

The title is an overt reference to Parks' debut album Song Cycle (1968), released 45 years earlier. Parks has said that he's likened it to Songs Cycled in that "in both cases, there’s a maverick on the loose, with a highly personal set of tunes and instrumentals. All of them reveal an iconoclast tilting at windmills, railing at tyrants, barking at masters of war, and celebrating a shameless commitment to the very definition of ‘Americana’." It also has a meaning of himself having come full circle in his recording career. Parks has expressed that Songs Cycled could "arguably" be his last album due to financial and physical challenges.

== Music ==
Much of the album contains themes that deal with recent American controversies. Regarding his general style, Parks said, "I think it is safe to say that my work can be branded Americana, but I think it's also safe to say it can be branded 'anti-Americana' and 'an inconvenient truth' as well.…There is very little 'divergent music' made in America. I go to 'worldbeat' to get out of the box. I think those influences show in my perspective." He continues, "I'm not troubled by variety; I like that in a show. I think it's okay to have that kind of a diet, and that confuses people who want an album all wrapped up, lassoed like a branded cow. They want it all to somehow be tightly connected, but I can't do that." Parks named his cover of Billy Edd Wheeler's "Sassafrass" as "outlaw chamber music," elaborating, "I did something heretical in taking his simple song and having my way with it—and deconstructing it intentionally as an 'inquiry' into the song—and hopefully to still celebrate the charm of its author."

The songs about real-life tragedies were written almost immediately after the events occurred. Parks chose not to record and release them for many years out of respect to the victims, whom he did not want to capitalize on. "Black Gold" was written and recorded shortly after the 2002 Prestige oil spill and has lyrics dealing with a fantasized version of the events. "Wall Street" was written as a response to the September 11 attacks, and "Money Is King" is described by Parks as "picking up where it left off," illustrating greed in post-9/11 corporate America. Parks elected to write additional lyrics for "Money Is King," the original author of which is Trinidadian calypsonian Growling Tiger. The American bombing of Baghdad is also explored in the lyrics to "Dreaming of Paris". "Missin' Missippi" [sic] was written about the Hurricane Katrina disaster, which devastated New Orleans in 2005.

Two tracks are re-recordings of previously written material from Parks' other albums. (Note: Of them, they are "The All Golden" from Song Cycle (1968) and "Hold Back Time" from Orange Crate Art (1995).) An instrumental recording made with The Esso Trinidad Steel Band is present on the album as "Aquarium": a steelpan version of a composition originally by Camille Saint-Saëns. (Note: It originally appeared on the album Esso (1971), which Parks co-produced and had recently reissued on his Bananastan label.)

== Artwork ==
The cover art for Songs Cycled was painted by Kenton Nelson. Artwork for the album's singles were contributed by a variety of visual artists which include Klaus Voormann, Ed Ruscha, Frank Holmes, and Art Spiegelman. Artist Charles Ray also sculpted two life-size statues of Parks for "Hold Back Time," which he calls "Side A" and "Side B". According to Parks, he did not approach any artists for collaboration; they contributed artwork out of courtesy and without charge.

== Reception ==
Professional ratings
Aggregate scores
| Source | Rating |
|---|---|
| Metacritic | 76/100 |
Review scores
| Source | Rating |
| AllMusic | 3.5/5 stars |
| Chicago Tribune | 3/4 stars |
| Consequence of Sound | 4/5 stars |
| The Observer | 3/5 stars |
| Pitchfork | 7.2/10 |
| Record Collector | 3/5 stars |
| Rolling Stone | 3.5/5 stars |
| Tiny Mix Tapes | 4/5 stars |

Songs Cycled was met with generally favorable reviews by critics. Pitchfork wrote of the album, "One of the ironies of Parks's music is that there's so much going on that it can be hard to figure out what to pay attention to. He rarely sticks to a single theme or emotion. ('Busy' is not an emotion.)" and adds, "At best Songs Cycled deals in quick-pivot moments…What these moments do-- especially in the context of music so dense and restless-- is frame Parks's range. In an instant, he reminds you of the extremes he's capable of: Cynicism and tenderness; clear lyricism and manic density; buttoned-up orchestras and dressed-down steel bands." Drowned In Sound reviewed, "Songs Cycled has everything you’d want from Van Dyke Parks and from an album. By being true to the Van Dyke Parks’ perception of what an album should contain, his music sounds as though it is from a different planet."

Some critics found the album's style abrasive, with Kitty Empire of The Observer writing "Those coming fresh to Parks may find his reedy voice, and his warping of time, requires some adjustment." The Seattle Post-Intelligencer wrote that "Songs Cycled is a rather sophisticated tour de force, with Parks showing off all his chops as a composer, arranger, producer, performer, lyricist, and, to a lesser degree, singer. It's not for everyone. It's beautiful but disconcerting, has one eye to the past but another firmly in the now, and is completely unpredictable from start to finish. This is an album you should sample at the Parks website or on YouTube and then decide if you want the full course."

== Track listing ==
All tracks are written by Van Dyke Parks, except where noted.

| No. | Title | Writer(s) | Sleeve art | Length |
|---|---|---|---|---|
| 1. | "Wedding in Madagascar (Faranaina)" | Traditional; arranged by Parks | Ed Ruscha | 2:53 |
| 2. | "Dreaming of Paris" | | Ed Ruscha | 3:47 |
| 3. | "Hold Back Time" | | Charles Ray ("Side One") | 3:44 |
| 4. | "Sassafrass" | Billy Edd Wheeler | Billy Edd Wheeler | 3:05 |
| 5. | "Black Gold" | | Frank Holmes | 6:24 |
| 6. | "Aquarium" | Saint-Saëns | Frank Holmes ("Dollar Sign") | 2:35 |
| 7. | "Money Is King" | Growling Tiger, Parks | Art Spiegelman ("Excess") | 3:06 |
| 8. | "Wall Street" | | Art Spiegelman ("Towers") | 4:35 |
| 9. | "The Parting Hand" | Traditional; arranged by Parks | Stanley Dorfman | 6:06 |
| 10. | "The All Golden" | | Klaus Voormann | 4:09 |
| 11. | "Missin' Mississippi" | | Sally Parks | 3:08 |
| 12. | "Amazing Graces" | Traditional; arranged by Parks | Charles Ray ("Side Two") | 3:15 |
| Total length: | | | | 46:43 |

== Personnel ==
- Van Dyke Parks – main performer, lead vocals, acoustic guitar, ukuleles, keyboards, piano, accordion, producer
- Matthew Cartsonis – mandocello, mandola, producer
- Ira Ingber – guitars, background vocals, additional recording and mixing
- Peter Kent – violins, concertmaster
- Cameron Stone – cellos
- Leland Sklar – electric bass guitar
- Don Heffington, Ian Zenith – percussion
- Carl Sealove – electric and acoustic bass guitars
- David Ralicke – saxophones
- Chris Bleth – woodwinds
- Dave Stone – double bass
- Inara George – background vocals
- Gaby Moreno – background vocals
- Kathy Dalton – background vocals
- Danny Hutton – background vocals
- Dash Hutton – background vocals
- Timothy Hutton – background vocals
- David P. Jackson – background vocals
- Bil Lane – mixer
- Rich Tosi – assistant mix engineer
- Doug Lacy – background vocals, studio recording super
