= FDR in Trinidad =

Song by Fritz McLean

"FDR in Trinidad" (also known as "Roosevelt in Trinidad") is a calypso song written by Fritz McLean and popularized by Atilla the Hun (Raymond Quevedo) to commemorate U.S. President Franklin Delano Roosevelt's 1936 trip to Trinidad. As part of Atilla and his band's repertoire in New York City during the 1930s and 1940s, it brought increased popularity to the genre. Roosevelt had become a calypso fan in 1934 following the band's performances in New York City during 1934.

The song was covered by Ry Cooder in his 1971 album Into the Purple Valley, by Van Dyke Parks in his 1972 album Discover America, and performed in local skits.
