= Frank J. Holmes =

American painter

Frank J. Holmes is an American visual artist based in San Francisco, California. Born in Louisville, Kentucky, on October 5, 1936, he is perhaps best known for his collaborations with the American musicians the Beach Boys and Van Dyke Parks. He has contributed album or sleeve artwork for their works The Smile Sessions (2011) and Songs Cycled (2013).
