= Will Carleton =

American poet (1845–1912)

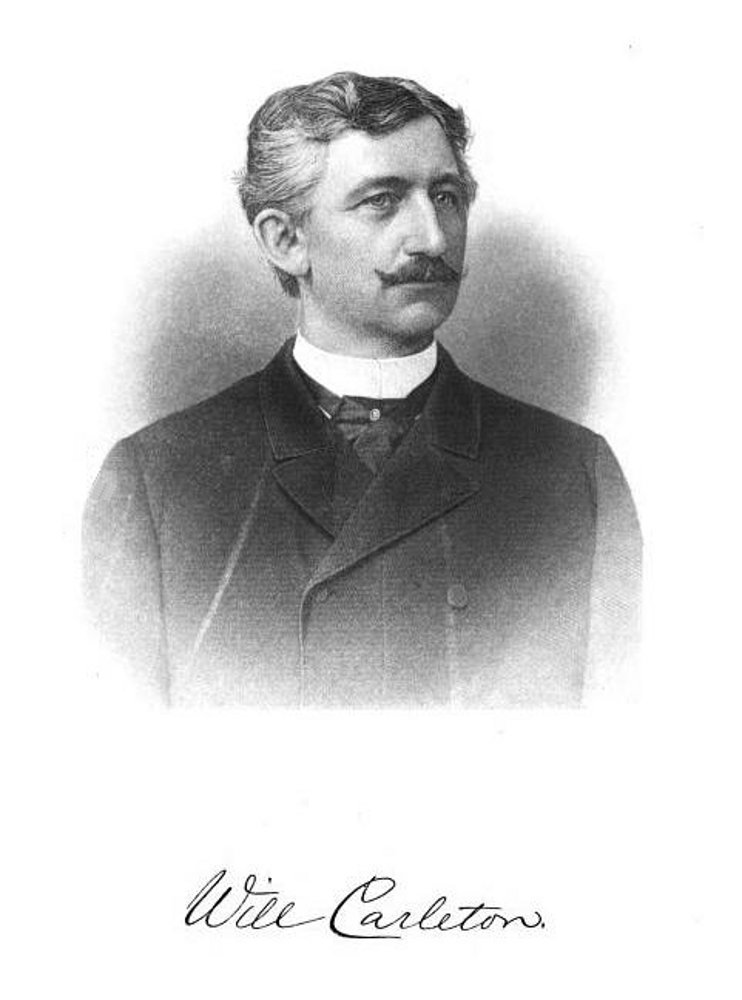
- Portrait in the Magazine of Poetry, 1890
- Born: October 21, 1845; Lenawee County, Hudson, Michigan, U.S.
- Died: December 18, 1912 (aged 67)
- Occupation: Writer

William McKendree Carleton (October 21, 1845 – December 18, 1912) was an American poet from Michigan. Carleton's poems were most often about his rural life.

== Biography ==
Carleton was born on October 21, 1845, in rural Lenawee County, Hudson, Michigan, Carleton was the fifth child of John Hancock and Celeste (Smith) Carleton. In 1869, he graduated from Hillsdale College, (where he was a member of Delta Tau Delta fraternity) and delivered on that occasion the poem, "Rifts in the Cloud".

After graduating from college in 1869, Carleton first worked as a newspaper journalist in Hillsdale. He had been in the habit of writing poetry as a youngster. His first significant work published was "Betsey and I Are Out", a humorous verse about a divorce that was first printed in the Toledo Blade, and reprinted by Harper's Weekly. Carleton wrote this poem at the age of 25, when he worked as editor of the Detroit Weekly Tribune. In 1872 he published "Over the Hill to the Poor House", exploring the plight of the aged and those with indifferent families. This piece captured national attention and catapulted Carleton into literary prominence—a position he held the rest of his life as he continued to write and to lecture from coast to coast".

In 1878, Carleton moved to Boston, an important literary and publishing center. There he married Anne Goodell. They moved to New York City in 1882. Carleton remained active in his college fraternity and served as the New York City Delta Tau Delta alumni chapter's president. In 1907, he returned to Hudson as a renowned poet. Carleton's quotes became well known in the US during his lifetime.

== Legacy and honors ==
With the Public Act 51 of 1919, the Michigan legislature required teachers to teach at least one of his poems to their students, and October 21 was officially named as Will Carleton Day in Michigan. Schools in Michigan named for him include Will Carleton Academy in Hillsdale, and Will Carleton Middle School in Sterling Heights. A section of the M-99 in Hillsdale is dubbed Will Carleton Road. The village of Carleton in Monroe County, Michigan, is named for him, and the road on Carleton's northern border, separating Monroe and Wayne counties, is Will Carleton Road.

On June 24, 2007, it was reported that "the neglected burial plot of the family of rural Michigan poet, Will Carleton, whose 1872 work, Over the Hill to the Poor House, thrust him into national prominence, is getting a makeover".

Musician Van Dyke Parks is his grand-nephew. He took the title for his album Clang of the Yankee Reaper from one of Carleton's poems.

== His works ==
"What Robert Burns did for the Scottish cotter and the Reverend William Barnes has done for the English farmer, Will Carleton has done for the American—touched with the glamour of poetry the simple and monotonous events of daily life, and shown that all circumstances of life, however trivial they may appear, possess those alternations of the comic and pathetic, the good and bad, the joyful and sorrowful, which go to make up the days and nights, the summers and winters, of this perplexing world".

- Rifts in the Cloud (1869)
- Poems (1871)
- Betsy and I Are Out (1871)
- Over the Hill to the Poorhouse (1872)
- Farm Ballads (1873)
- Farm Legends (1875)
- Young Folks' Centennial Rhymes (1876)
- Our Travelled Parson (1879)
- Farm Festivals (1881)
- The First Settler's Story (1881)
- Her Tour (1882)
- The Old Reading Class (1883)
- The Hero of the Tower (1884)
- City Ballads (1885)
- The Convict's Christmas Eve (1887)
- An Ancient Spell (1887)
- City Legends (1889)
- City Festivals (1892)
- The Vestal Virgin (1893)
- Four Dogs (1894)
- Rhymes of Our Planet (1895)
- The Lianhan Shee (1900)
- Out of the Old House, Nancy (1900)
- Songs of Two Centuries (1902)
- The Little Black-Eyed Rebel (1906)
- A Thousand Thoughts with Index of Subjects (1908)

== General sources ==
- Author and Book Info.com
