= Into the Purple Valley =

Studio album by Ry Cooder
- Released: January 1972
- Recorded: 1971
- Genre: Country folk
- Length: 37:06
- Label: Reprise
- Producer: Jim Dickinson, Lenny Waronker

Ry Cooder chronology
Ry Cooder (1970)	Into the Purple Valley (1972)	Boomer's Story (1972)

Professional ratings
Review scores
Source	Rating
AllMusic	4.5/5 stars
Christgau's Record Guide	B+
The Encyclopedia of Popular Music	4/5 stars
MusicHound Rock: The Essential Album Guide	3.5/5 stars
The Rolling Stone Album Guide	3/5 stars

Into the Purple Valley is the second studio album by roots rock musician Ry Cooder, released in 1972.

The album's front cover is listed at number 12 on Rolling Stone's 100 Greatest Album Covers. It shows Cooder and his then wife, Susan Titelman, in a Buick convertible at the Warner Bros. film lot in Burbank, California.

== Background ==
The selection of songs focuses primarily on older American music, including covers of works by Lead Belly and Woody Guthrie, as well as calypso and gospel numbers such as "F.D.R. in Trinidad" and "Denomination Blues". "F.D.R. in Trinidad" was also covered on Discover America (1972), a solo album by Van Dyke Parks, who played keyboards on this album.

"Tear Drops Will Fall" is a cover of a song that became a hit single in 1959 for Dickey Doo & the Don'ts. However, Cooder himself has stated that he first became familiar with the song through Wilson Pickett's version.

== Critical reception ==
Record Collector wrote that the album "reached deep into tradition, unearthing neglected treasures from America’s past and reshaping them for the post-Woodstock generation."

== Track listing ==
Side One

1. "How Can You Keep On Moving (Unless You Migrate Too)" (Agnes "Sis" Cunningham) – 2:25
2. "Billy the Kid" (Traditional; arranged by Ry Cooder) – 3:45
3. "Money Honey" (Jesse Stone) – 3:28
4. "FDR in Trinidad" (Fitz McLean) – 3:01
5. "Teardrops Will Fall" (Gerry "Dickey Doo" Granahan, Marion Smith) – 3:03
6. "Denomination Blues" (George Washington Phillips) – 3:58

Side Two

1. "On a Monday" (Lead Belly) – 2:52
2. "Hey Porter" (Johnny Cash) – 4:34
3. "Great Dream from Heaven" (instrumental) (Joseph Spence) – 1:53
4. "Taxes on the Farmer Feeds Us All" (Traditional; arranged by Ry Cooder) – 3:52
5. "Vigilante Man" (Woody Guthrie) – 4:15

(Note: "Taxes on the Farmer Feeds Us All" was actually composed by Fiddlin' John Carson.)

== Personnel ==
- Ry Cooder – guitars, mandolin, vocals
- Van Dyke Parks – keyboards
- Gloria Jones – vocals
- Claudia Lennear – vocals
- George Bohanon – horns
- Jim Keltner – drums
- John Craviotto – drums
- Joe Lane Davis – horns
- Jim Dickinson – piano
- Chris Ethridge – bass
- Milt Holland – percussion
- Jerry Jumonville – saxophone
- Fritz Richmond – washtub bass
- Donna Washburn – vocals
- Donna Weiss – vocals
- Ike Williams – horns

Technical

- Mike Salisbury – cover design
- Marty Evans – cover photography

== Billboard charts ==
Chart	Peak
Pop albums	113
