= Tommy Morgan =

American musician (1932–2022)

- Born: Thomas Morgan Edwards; December 4, 1932; Los Angeles, California
- Died: June 23, 2022 (aged 89)
- Genres: Pop music
- Occupation: Musician
- Instrument: Harmonica
- Years active: 1950s–2013
- Website: www.tmorganharmonica.com

Thomas Morgan Edwards (December 4, 1932 – June 23, 2022) was an American harmonicist and session musician, who had been active since the 1950s. He was considered one of the most heard harmonica players in the world, playing in over 500 feature films.

Morgan's extraordinarily prolific career spanned seven decades, and included playing on (and occasionally composing) themes and incidental music for dozens of major Hollywood films, and hundreds of episodes of American television series, including main themes for The Rockford Files and Sanford and Son. Although frequently uncredited in his earlier career (as was typical for session musicians of that era), Morgan also has a huge list of credits in popular music—among the most notable in that field are his prominent contributions to the seminal mid-1960s recordings by The Beach Boys, including the Pet Sounds album, their number one single "Good Vibrations" and the recordings made for their uncompleted Smile project.

He retired after a stroke in late 2013 and died at the age of 89 on June 23, 2022.

== Awards ==
In 2001, Morgan received a Special Lifetime Achievement Award from The Society for the Preservation and Advancement of the Harmonica.

== Collaborations ==
- Randy Newman – Randy Newman (1968)
- Rainy Days and Mondays – The Carpenters (1971)
- Playing Possum – Carly Simon (1975)
- Beautiful Noise – Neil Diamond (1976)
- Making a Good Thing Better – Olivia Newton-John (1977)
- I'm Glad You're Here with Me Tonight – Neil Diamond (1977)
- Don't Cry Out Loud – Melissa Manchester (1978)
- Change of Heart – Eric Carmen (1978)
- Barry – Barry Manilow (1980)
- Dolly, Dolly, Dolly – Dolly Parton (1981)
- Peter Cetera – Peter Cetera (1981)
- Looking Back with Love – Mike Love (1981)
- Love Will Turn You Around – Kenny Rogers (1982)
- Lush Life – Linda Ronstadt (1984)
- Jump! – Van Dyke Parks (1984)
- Emotion – Juice Newton (1987)
- The Rumour – Olivia Newton-John (1988)
- Bellybutton – Jellyfish (1990)
- The Crossing – Paul Young (1993)
- The Christmas Album, Volume II – Neil Diamond (1994)
- Orange Crate Art – Brian Wilson, Van Dyke Parks (1995)
- White Christmas – Rosemary Clooney (1996)
- Signs of Life – Steven Curtis Chapman (1996)
- Peace on Earth – Peabo Bryson (1997)
- Pianist, arranger, composer, Conductor – Richard Carpenter (1998)
- A Love Like Ours – Barbra Streisand (1999)
- October Road – James Taylor (2002)
- Midnight – Diane Schuur (2003)
- That Lucky Old Sun – Brian Wilson (2008)
- Dreams – Neil Diamond (2010)
- Red Dead Redemption Soundtrack (2010)
- It's the Girls! – Bette Midler (2014)

== Bibliography ==
- Morgan, Tommy (1972). Chromatic Harmonica. Gwyn Publishing Company. ASIN B00223O8H4.
- Morgan, Tommy (1987). Blues Harmonica. Alfred Music. ISBN 978-0739025215.
