= Clang of the Yankee Reaper =

Studio album by Van Dyke Parks
- Released: May 1976
- Genre: Calypso
- Length: 29:28
- Label: Warner Bros.
- Producer: Andrew Wickham, Trevor Lawrence

Van Dyke Parks chronology
| Discover America (1972) | Clang of the Yankee Reaper (1976) | Jump! (1984) |

Professional ratings
Review scores
| Source | Rating |
|---|---|
| AllMusic | 3/5 stars |
| Pitchfork Media | 7.7/10 |
| Rolling Stone | (Not Rated) |

Clang of the Yankee Reaper is the third studio album by Van Dyke Parks, released in 1976. It continues his exploration of calypso music started in the previous album Discover America (1972). In particular, it contains several songs by Mighty Sparrow and Lord Kitchener, as well as a diverse selection of past and present music in the tradition of the Americas. It is primarily cover versions, and contains only one original Parks composition. The album was dedicated to the late Frederick Mears Wainwright.

Parks has reflected harshly of the album years later, describing it as "brain dead". He added, "That album was done at the nadir of my entire life. Psychologically I was in a terrible state, I was despairing. My best friend had just died – my roommate, he was my roommate. We scattered his ashes at sea, and they flew back into our faces... a terrible, terrible insult. I was grieving, I'd just been divorced, I'd just left Warner Brothers in disgust as I didn't want to be a corporate lackey, didn't approve of record business practices – you know, what can I say? 'Lost my job, the truck blew up, my dog died.'"

The title is taken from a poem by Parks' great-uncle Will Carleton.

== Track listing ==
1. "Clang of the Yankee Reaper" (Martin Kibbee, Trevor Lawrence, Van Dyke Parks) – 3:41
2. "City on the Hill" (Winston Monseque) – 3:00
3. "Pass That Stage" (Mighty Sparrow) – 3:00
4. "Another Dream" (The Sandpebbles of Barbados) – 2:54
5. "You're a Real Sweetheart" (Irving Caesar, Cliff Friend) – 1:12
6. "Love Is the Answer" (F. Williams) – 3:28
7. "Iron Man" (Stanley "Squibby" Cummings) – 3:05
8. "Tribute to Spree" (Lord Kitchener) – 3:37
9. "Soul Train" (Lord Kitchener) – 3:12
10. "Canon in D" (Johann Pachelbel) – 2:42

Notes:

- Lord Kitchener is referred to as Aldwyn Roberts, and Mighty Sparrow as Slinger Francisco.
- Track 7, is often cited by other artists to be a Lord Kitchener (Aldwyn Roberts) composition.
- Track 10, listed as Pachelbel's Canon in D is in actuality "Ein feste Burg ist unser Gott" by Martin Luther, or as it is known in English, "A Mighty Fortress is Our God". It is also not in D, but Ab.

== Personnel ==
- Van Dyke Parks – vocals
- Jesse Ed Davis, Fred Tackett – guitar
- Chili Charles, Robert Greenidge, Hugh Borde, Jim Keltner – drums
- Bobby Keys – saxophone
- Klaus Voormann – bass guitar
- Hollis Durity – congas
- Malcolm Cecil – synthesizer
- Noble Williams
- Trevor Lawrence – arrangements
- Bob Thompson – orchestration on "Canon in D"

Technical

- Donn Landee, Lee Herschberg, Richard Moore, Serge Reyes – engineers
- Henry Defreitas, Hugh Borde, Sandy Jules – research
- Ed Thrasher – art direction, photographer
