= Discover America =

Studio album by Van Dyke Parks
- Released: May 1972
- Genre: Calypso; progressive pop; art rock; Americana
- Length: 37:09
- Label: Warner Bros.
- Producer: Linda Perry; Durrie Parks

Van Dyke Parks chronology
Song Cycle (1967)	Discover America (1972)	Clang of the Yankee Reaper (1975)

Discover America is the second album by American recording artist Van Dyke Parks, released in May 1972 by Warner Bros. Its sound is a major departure from his debut album, Song Cycle (1967), featuring all cover versions of previously written songs.

The album mostly features songs popularized by early calypso musicians, as well as songs by Allen Toussaint ("Occapella" and "Riverboat"), Little Feat ("Sailin' Shoes"), John Philip Sousa ("Stars and Stripes Forever") and one song of unknown origin ("Be Careful").

The title of the album is derived from the poem "I Am Waiting" by Lawrence Ferlinghetti.

== Background ==
Most of the album's songs were originally written by early calypso musicians between the 1920s and 1940s, but had fallen into the public domain by the time Discover America was recorded in 1972. As such, nearly all of the songs are credited to "public domain; arranged & adapted by Van Dyke Parks." The album's lyrical themes center on American historical figures, including Revolutionary War naval officer John Paul Jones, musicians Bing Crosby and the Mills Brothers, actor Jack Palance, and political figures Franklin Roosevelt and J. Edgar Hoover.

Parks would continue his study of Calypso and Caribbean music on his third album, Clang of the Yankee Reaper, released in 1975. Throughout the 1970s, Parks produced calypso albums for other artists, including the Esso Trinidad Tripoli Steel Band's Esso in 1971 and Mighty Sparrow's 1974 album Hot and Sweet.

== Songs ==
Discover America has been described as a work of calypso, progressive pop, art rock, and Americana.

"Jack Palance", is a one-minute clip of Mighty Sparrow's version of the song. Parks did not cover any Mighty Sparrow songs on the album, but would later produce Sparrow's 1974 album Hot and Sweet.

"Introduction" is credited to Samuel Alter, and features an unknown man (likely either Alter or Parks) speaking into a tape recorder about Parnassus, Pennsylvania, Mount Olympus, and Daylight Saving Time. The third track is Parks' cover of "Bing Crosby" by Roaring Lion. "Steelband Music" prominently features the Esso Trinidad Tripoli Steel Band on vocals and steel drums; the song's original writer is unknown, and it may be a traditional song from Trinidad.

"The Four Mills Brothers" was written by The Lion (also known as Roaring Lion), and it speaks about the history and fame of jazz vocal group the Mills Brothers. The song's chorus is lifted from that of "I Ain't Got Nobody", a song covered by The Mills Brothers.

"Be Careful" has been described by AllMusic as "a piece of advice from a father to a son when the offspring is approaching the age when love is being considered. A brilliant, almost chamber string arrangement carries the overall melody, yet this is combined with the Trinidad steel band music that Van Dyke Parks was fully and happily involved in at the time." AllMusic credits the song to Leo Robin, but this is an error. The author is currently unknown.

"John Jones" was performed by Trojan Records artist Rudy Mills in the late 1960s. "FDR in Trinidad" was written by Attila the Hun about Franklin D. Roosevelt's 1936 visit to Trinidad. Parks' version features performances by members of Little Feat.

A Rykodisc version of Discover America contains a bonus track, a cover of Joseph Spence's "Out on the Rolling Sea (Where Jesus Speaks to Me)".

== Reception ==
Professional ratings
Review scores
Source	Rating
AllMusic	4.5/5 stars
The Encyclopedia of Popular Music	3/5 stars
Pitchfork	8.5/10
The Rolling Stone Album Guide	3.5/5 stars
Uncut	4/5 stars

Released in May 1972 by Warner Bros. Records, initially only in North America, Discover America received positive reviews from music critics. In their review, Billboard praised the "richly rewarding" album as a "marvellous synthesis of sounds and eras", drawing attention to the memorable songs, the presence of Parks' "strange charisma" and the appearances from the Esso Trinidad Steel Band throughout. Rolling Stone writer John Mendelsohn noted the album saw Parks' continue his "celebration of the musical culture of the West Indies" after his prior production of the Steel Band. Describing the album as far more accessible than Song Cycle (1967), he wrote that the record is danceable, interesting and sometimes enchanting, but found that the musician had yet to capture the steel band sound effectively.

Gene Sculatti of Creem highlighted the calypso focus and deemed it an art rock project reminiscent of those released less than five years earlier. Commenting on the lack of straight "rock 'n' roll", he added the few rock elements "are purposeful, placed with regard to their function in that spot, just like the Forties movie music, the Tiny Tim throw-offs, the Magic Band loon frills, accordions, Tex-Mex rhythms, et. Al. They all play parts in Discover America and together, the aural relief they create is indescribably delicious if you're in the mood for it." Words & Music writer Mark Leviton described the album as a mix of "Caribbean rhythms, '30 lyrics, modern pop, rhythm and blues and atonal classical techniques" which together form a "composite musical picture of the United States". He also drew attention to its unusual compositional elements, highlighting the "rampant counterpoint, counter-rhythms, odd harmonic progressions, non-resolving chords and obscure lyrics".

Retrospectively, Jayson Greene Pitchfork noted the album's "distanced weirdness", writing that "Parks treats calypso with the same forensic fascination and trickster spirit he applied to Song Cycle", further considering Discover America to be more vaudevillian than that album. AllMusic reviewer Lindsay Planer praised Parks' "purity of vision", writing that few could create a concept album about America "entirely in the style of the Caribbean, most specifically Trinidad circa the 1940s". They deemed it an "eclectic masterpiece of multicultural Americana" and a "pop music history lesson that is without question one of the lost classics of the early '70s. Likewise, it may as easily have been several decades ahead of its time." In Uncut, Alaistar McKay considered the album a "joyous" celebration of Trinidadian culture balanced by sly commentary on post-colonial Trinidad and American race relations. He added that the album foreshadowed the Clash's work from "a decade later in their pan-global phase".

=== Legacy ===
In a 1997 interview, Parks' former collaborator Brian Wilson of the Beach Boys praised Discover America as one of his favorite albums: "I liked Discover America by Van Dyke – that's the greatest album ever made. Oh. Have you heard it? I've played it, like, 50 times, maybe, over the years. I've really learned a lot from it. It's really something how you play something and you hear something and you don't quite hear exactly the way you did before. It's really different."

== Track listing ==
All songs "public domain; arranged & adapted by Van Dyke Parks" unless otherwise noted.

Side one
No.	Title	Writer(s)	Length
1.	"Jack Palance"	Mighty Sparrow	0:59
2.	"Introduction"	Samuel Alter	0:27
3.	"Bing Crosby"	The Lion	2:21
4.	"Steelband Music"		2:11
5.	"The Four Mills Brothers"	The Lion	1:28
6.	"Be Careful"		2:48
7.	"John Jones"	Rudy Mills	3:08
8.	"FDR in Trinidad"	Fitz McLean	2:27
9.	"Sweet Trinidad"		0:56
Total length:			16:45

Side two
No.	Title	Writer(s)	Length
1.	"Occapella"	Allen Toussaint	2:41
2.	"Sailin' Shoes"	Lowell George	2:09
3.	"Riverboat"	Allen Toussaint	3:02
4.	"Ode to Tobago"	Lord Kitchener; arr. Parks	5:13
5.	"Your Own Comes First"	Lord Kitchener; arr. Parks	3:24
6.	"G-Man Hoover"	Sir Lancelot	2:55
7.	"Stars and Stripes Forever"	John Philip Sousa	1:00
Total length:			20:24

A Rykodisc edition added "Out on the Rolling Sea (Where Jesus Speaks to Me)" to the end of the album.

== Copyrights and legalities ==
Nearly all tracks on Discover America are listed on the album sleeve as being "Public domain, arranged & adapted by Van Dyke Parks". However, many of the songs' original artists were still alive in 1972, but were not given writing credits on the album. At the time, The United States' Copyright Act of 1909 allowed for a copyright term of 28 years, followed by an optional one-time renewal for a second 28-year term. As such, the longest copyright allowed was 56 years from the original creation date.

The Copyright Act of 1976, signed into law only four years after Discover America was recorded, greatly changed copyright laws in the US, extending the copyright of the artist to either 75 years or the life of the author plus an additional 50 years.
