= Orange Crate Art =

Studio album by Brian Wilson and Van Dyke Parks
- Released: October 24, 1995
- Recorded: 1992–1995
- Genre: Art pop
- Length: 47:51
- Label: Warner Bros. 45427
- Producer: Van Dyke Parks

Brian Wilson chronology
I Just Wasn't Made for These Times (1995)	Orange Crate Art (1995)	Imagination (1998)

Van Dyke Parks chronology
Tokyo Rose (1989)	Orange Crate Art (1995)	Moonlighting: Live at the Ash Grove (1998)

Orange Crate Art is the first collaborative studio album by American musicians Brian Wilson and Van Dyke Parks, released in 1995 on Warner Bros. Records. The album consists mostly of songs written and arranged by Parks, with Wilson featured as lead and backing vocalist. Its title refers to the sun-drenched, idealized paintings that grace wooden fruit crates, and its theme is a nostalgic view of the history of California.

== Background ==
In the thirty years following their collaboration on the ill-fated Beach Boys' Smile project, Wilson and Parks had each developed their own solo careers.

It [the title track] was a beautiful song, and I was determined to put some lyrics to it. The first thing that came to mind was the word "orange." "Orange," of course being impossible to rhyme—is problematic in many other ways—but is also a totemic of the California dream, and I thought if there was anybody I wanted to have sing that, it would be Brian Wilson.…Probably my first impression of California was an orange. At Christmastime or something once upon a time, that was a very special thing to have—an orange—because it came by train.…It was to extol the propagandist art that brought California a sense of realty; it made real estate salable with the idea that California offered a Garden of Eden, a perpetual bread basket, [and] a virtual cornicop. It pretends to be somnambulistic, but it really is an urging to think about California on those terms of lost love, of things that are disappearing, and the potential of the human spirit.

— Van Dyke Parks

Sometime in 1992, Parks approached a then-reclusive Wilson with the invitation to record an album together. Wilson was in the middle of a court-ordered removal and restraining order from his psychiatrist, which came as a result of years of overmedication and gross misconduct. According to Parks, "The reason why I asked him was to take care of this unfinished business, and to try to escape from the tyranny of the sense of history that's been placed on our own aborted effort. [Smile]" Later adding, "When I found him, he was alone in a room staring at a television. It was off."

It is reported that Wilson interrupted the first vocal session for the album by asking Parks, "Wait a minute. What am I even doing here?" Parks hit the talk button and responded, "You’re here because I can’t stand the sound of my own voice!" Wilson paused, nodded his head, and stepped up to the microphone proclaiming, "Well, that makes sense! Okay, take one!"

Though billed and anticipated as a full collaboration, the album is devoted to Parks' compositions, and features his typical dense wordplay and orchestrations. Wilson for his part contributes only the vocals and vocal arrangements. Parks also reported that despite his invitation, Wilson had declined to contribute any music to the project. Despite this, he was impassioned to record the album for Parks, determined to make something that he "could live with" ten years from then.

== Reception ==
Professional ratings
Review scores
Source	Rating
AllMusic	3/5 stars
Christgau's Consumer Guide	(neither)
Entertainment Weekly	A−
MusicHound Rock	3/5 stars
Orlando Sentinel	4/5 stars
The Rolling Stone Album Guide	3.5/5 stars

Given the history of its artists, the album came with high expectations, but upon release it received mixed critical reviews and had lackluster sales, failing even to chart. Stephen Thomas Erlewine for AllMusic wrote, "Van Dyke Parks' approach is intellectual, not instinctual, which means his compositions are over-labored and overwrought. Instead of making his melodies catchy, Parks makes sure they are complex, which means they are rarely memorable. Similarly, his lyrics are dense and laden with poetic imagery and metaphors, yet they are entirely too cerebral for a pop album. Then again, Orange Crate Art isn't a pop album—it's a self-conscious work of art."

Parks has repeatedly stated his disappointment with the album's reception, saying "It took three years and $350,000. The record came out and sank without a trace."

== Track listing ==
All tracks are written by Van Dyke Parks, except where noted.

No.	Title	Length
1.	"Orange Crate Art"	3:00
2.	"Sail Away"	5:15
3.	"My Hobo Heart" (lyrics by Michael Hazelwood)	3:16
4.	"Wings of a Dove"	3:07
5.	"Palm Tree and Moon"	4:07
6.	"Summer in Monterey" (lyrics by Hazelwood)	4:14
7.	"San Francisco"	4:28
8.	"Hold Back Time"	3:39
9.	"My Jeanine"	3:13
10.	"Movies Is Magic"	3:54
11.	"This Town Goes Down at Sunset" (Hazelwood)	3:21
12.	"Lullaby" (George Gershwin)	6:06

2020 reissue bonus tracks
No.	Title	Length
13.	"Rhapsody In Blue" (G. Gershwin)	3:40
14.	"Love Is Here To Stay" (G. Gershwin, Ira Gershwin)	3:44
15.	"What a Wonderful World" (Bob Thiele, George David Weiss)	3:06

== Personnel ==
- Brian Wilson – vocals, vocal arrangements
- Van Dyke Parks – keyboards, composer, producer, arrangements

Additional personnel

- Britt Bacon – engineer
- Johnny Britt – background vocals
- Dennis Budimir – guitars & mandolins
- Chili Charles – drums & percussion
- Ken Deranteriasian – engineer
- Bruce Donnelly – synth programming
- Bernie Dresel – drums & percussion
- Bruce Dukov – concertmaster
- Michael Frondelli – mixing
- Grant Geissman – guitars & mandolins
- Clark Germain – engineer
- Donny Gerrard – background vocals
- Jules Greene – background vocals
- Richard Greene – violin
- Robert Greenidge – steel drums
- Danny Hutton – background vocals, co-lead vocals on “Hold Back Time”
- Ira Ingber – guitars & mandolins, synth programming
- Bob Joyce – background vocals
- David Joyce – background vocals
- Doug Lacy – background vocals
- Arnold McCuller – background vocals
- Murray McFadden – engineer
- David McKelvy – harmonicas
- Tommy Morgan – harmonicas
- Brian Otto – guitars & mandolins
- Sid Page – concertmaster
- Marvin Saunders – synth programming
- Dan Savant – trumpet
- Terry Schonig – hammer dulcimer
- Carl Sealove – bass guitar
- Leland Sklar – bass guitar
- Brian Soucy – engineer
- Fred Tackett – guitars & mandolins
- Carmen Twillie – background vocals
- Andy Waterman – engineer
- Lenny Waronker – executive production
- Mike Watts – synth programming
- Monalisa Young – background vocals
