= Jump! (album) =

Studio album by Van Dyke Parks
- Released: 1984
- Recorded: December 1982 to February 1983
- Studios: Cherokee, Hollywood, CA
- Genres: Pop, show tunes
- Length: 35:50
- Label: Warner Bros.
- Producer: Steve Goldman

Van Dyke Parks chronology
Clang of the Yankee Reaper (1975)	Jump! (1984)	Tokyo Rose (1989)

Jump! is a studio album by the American musician Van Dyke Parks, released in 1984 on Warner Bros. Records. The album is a retelling of Joel Chandler Harris's Uncle Remus tales. Parks mixes numerous musical styles, including bluegrass, Tin Pan Alley, 1930s jazz, and Broadway musical.

== Critical reception ==
Professional ratings
Review scores
Source	Rating
AllMusic	4.5/5 stars
The Philadelphia Inquirer	3/5 stars
Rolling Stone	4/5 stars

The New York Times wrote that the music "has the effervescence and tunefulness of the best scores for Disney films." The Fresno Bee determined that "this musical-without-a-stage fuses Gershwin, ragtime, a little light opera and precious little contemporary pop into an intriguing work."

== Track listing ==
All lyrics written by Martin Fyodr Kibbee and Van Dyke Parks, except where noted; all music composed by Van Dyke Parks.

1. "Jump!" (instrumental) – 2:02
2. "Opportunity for Two" – 3:16
3. "Come Along" – 3:26
4. "I Ain't Goin' Home" – 3:45
5. "Many a Mile to Go" – 3:42
6. "Taps" (instrumental) – 2:16
7. "An Invitation to Sin" – 3:20
8. "Home" (Lyrics: Terry Gilkyson and Parks) – 2:55
9. "After the Ball" – 3:52
10. "Look Away" (Lyrics: Parks) – 4:03
11. "Hominy Grove" – 3:26

== Personnel ==
- Van Dyke Parks – vocals, piano
- Jennifer Warnes – background vocals
- Lennie Niehaus – arranger, conductor
- Kathy Dalton – vocals
- Jim Keltner, Robert Greenidge – drums
- Stanley Behrens – harmonica, alto horn
- Jim Hughart – bass guitar
- Danny Hutton – vocals
- Tommy Morgan – harmonica
- Emil Richards – percussion
- Fred Tackett – guitar, banjo, mandolin
- Ken Watson – cymbals
- Gayle Levant – harp
- Ian Freebairn-Smith – vocal arrangement
