= Randy Newman (album) =

Studio album by Randy Newman
- Released: April 1968
- Recorded: 1968
- Genres: Orchestral pop; baroque pop
- Length: 27:24
- Label: Reprise
- Producers: Lenny Waronker; Van Dyke Parks

Randy Newman chronology
Peyton Place – Original Music from the Hit TV Show (1966)	Randy Newman (1968)	12 Songs (1970)

Singles from Spring
- 1. "I Think It's Going to Rain Today"/"The Beehive State" Released: 1968

Revised cover
- Cover used for later releases

Randy Newman is the debut album by American singer-songwriter Randy Newman, released in 1968 by Reprise Records. The album is sometimes referred to as Randy Newman Creates Something New Under the Sun, written on the reverse of the album sleeve. Newman had been a noted songwriter for some years prior to the release of his debut, which was advertised as sounding "like a greatest hits". In contrast to his later albums which usually feature Newman and his piano with a rock backing, Randy Newman is highly orchestral.

Randy Newman was not a commercial success. It never dented the Billboard Top 200; indeed, according to Ken Tucker, the album sold so poorly that Warner offered buyers the opportunity to trade the album for another in the company's catalog. The album was out of print for over 15 years until it was issued on CD in 1995, remastered by Lee Herschberg. Randy Newman has received critical attention in recent years. In 2000, it was placed number 716 in Colin Larkin's All Time Top 1000 Albums. In 2017, the album was ranked the 97th greatest album of the 1960s by Pitchfork.

== Details ==
Newman later commented on the lack of influence from rock and roll on the album.

"It's like I'd never heard The Rolling Stones. I thought you could move things along just with the orchestra, that it was somehow cheating to use drums. What Van Dyke and I, and Harry Nilsson to some degree, were doing, it was like a branch of homo sapiens that didn't become homo sapiens. Homo erectus," he said.

Newman said in 2017, that he signed away the publishing rights on his first album, does not see any money from people doing covers of those songs, and advised people getting into the business to never sign away their publishing.

== Previous versions of songs on this album ==
As with many of Newman's early albums, several Newman-penned songs had been previously recorded by other artists.

- "I Think It's Going to Rain Today", was originally recorded and released by Julius LaRosa in 1966. It had also been covered in 1966/67 by Judy Collins, Eric Burdon, and others.
- "Living Without You" was issued as a single (under the title "So Hard Living Without You") by Keith Shields in February 1967.
- "Love Story" was released as a single by The Brothers in August 1967.
- "So Long Dad" was released as a single by Manfred Mann in September 1967.
- The Alan Price Set issued recordings of "Living Without You", "Bet No One Ever Hurt This Bad" (as "No One Ever Hurt So Bad") and "So Long Dad" on their 1967 album A Price On His Head.

== Singles ==
"I Think It's Going to Rain Today" b/w "The Beehive State" was issued as a single on Reprise 0284. Reprise also issued this single on a promotional 10" vinyl 78 rpm record as the first (and only) release under their proposed "Reprise Speed Series" of 78 RPM releases (the series was discontinued by Reprise due to a lack of interest and sales a few months after this release).

== Reception ==
Bruce Grimes of Rolling Stone described the album as being characterized by a "mood of a bitter longing for affection". Noting that English record producer Denny Cordell had dubbed Newman “the foremost practitioner of suburban blues,” Grimes continued: "certainly 'Love Story' is the blues of Middle America. The song marks out a simple pattern of life: boy meets girl, gets married, lives in suburbia, has children, dies. Randy moves in on The Dream in an uncommon way: 'When our kids are grown/They’ll send us away to a little home in Florida/ We’ll play checkers all day/Till we pass away.'"

== Legacy ==
Critic Ellen Willis feels that the songs on the album, "show an intimate familiarity with, and an affection for, all the nuances of American life - the setting and characters, the family relationships, the romantic fantasies, the euphemisms - as well as an unsparing awareness of our oppression of old people, fat people, and other nonmainstream types."

William Ruhlmann in an AllMusic retrospective review feels that Newman's lyrics are "intent upon taking clichés and using them to satirize social conventions, a popular parlor game in the late '60s." Overall he considers the album "an audacious first album by a major, if extremely quirky, talent."

In 2000 it was voted number 716 in Colin Larkin's All Time Top 1000 Albums.

== Track listing ==
All songs written and arranged by Randy Newman.

1. "Love Story (You and Me)" – 3:20
2. "Bet No One Ever Hurt This Bad" – 2:00
3. "Living Without You" – 2:25
4. "So Long Dad" – 2:02
5. "I Think He's Hiding" – 3:04
6. "Linda" – 2:27
7. "Laughing Boy" – 1:55
8. "Cowboy" – 2:36
9. "The Beehive State" – 1:50
10. "I Think It's Going to Rain Today" – 2:55
11. "Davy the Fat Boy" – 2:50

== Personnel ==
- Randy Newman – vocals, piano
- Tony Terran – trumpet on "Cowboy"
- Herb Ellis – guitar
- Jim Horn – saxophone
- Plas Johnson – saxophone
- Larry Knechtel – guitar, bass guitar, keyboards
- Carol Kaye – bass guitar
- Al Casey – guitar
- Milt Bernhart – trombone
- Mike Deasy – guitar
- Ron Elliott – guitar
- Lyle Ritz – bass guitar
- Jim Gordon – drums
- Tommy Morgan – harmonica
- Ray Kelley – cello
- Ted Nash – saxophone
- Don Bagley – bass guitar
- James Burton – guitar
- Israel Baker, Arnold Belnick, Harold Bemko, Harry Bluestone, William Kurash, Leonard Malarsky, Jerome Reisler, William Weiss, Tibor Zelig – violin
- Samuel Boghossian – viola
- Gene Cipriano – saxophone
- Gary Coleman – percussion, including mallets
- Nick DeCaro – piano, accordion
- Frank DeCaro – guitar
- James Decker – French horn
- David Duke – French horn
- Carl Fortina – accordion
- Frederick Seykora – cello
- James Getzoff – flute
- Joe Gibbons – guitar
- Bill Green – saxophone
- Dick Hyde – trombone
- Armand Karpoff – cello
- Louis Kievman – viola
- Michael Lang – piano
- Don Lanier – guitar
- Gary LeVant – harmonica
- Lew McCreary – trombone
- Jay Migliori – saxophone
- Sid Miller – saxophone
- Ollie Mitchell – trumpet
- Louis Morell – guitar
- Richard Perissi – French horn
- Bill Perkins – saxophone
- Jerome Reisler – violin
- Victor Sazer – cello
- Ralph Schaeffer – violin
- Wilbur Schwartz – saxophone
- Leonard Selic – viola
- Sid Sharp – violin
- Tommy Tedesco – guitar
- Sal Valentino – guitar, vocals
- Tibor Zelig – violin
- Hubert Anderson – percussion, including mallets
- Joseph Difiore – viola
- William Hinshaw – French horn
- Thomas Scott – saxophone
- Harold Ayties – viola
- Jesse Emrlich – cello
- Elizabeth Ershoff – harp
- David Filerman – cello
- Gene Garf – piano, organ
- Jan Hlinka – viola
- Norm Jeffries – drums
- Gordon Pope – saxophone
- Jimmy Rowles – piano
- Joseph Tullio – cello
- William Weiss – violin
- Bobby Knight – trombone

Technical

- Lee Herschberg – engineer, supervisor
- Tommy LiPuma – engineer
- Ed Thrasher – art direction
- Guy Webster – cover photography
