= Ry Cooder (album) =

Studio album by Ry Cooder
- Released: December 1970
- Recorded: 1970
- Genres: Roots rock; blues; country blues; folk; Americana
- Length: 33:28
- Label: Reprise
- Producers: Van Dyke Parks, Lenny Waronker

Ry Cooder chronology
Ry Cooder (1970)	Into the Purple Valley (1972)

Professional ratings
Review scores
Source	Rating
AllMusic	link
Christgau's Record Guide	B

Ry Cooder is the debut studio album by roots rock musician Ry Cooder released in December 1970 by Reprise. The album is composed of six cover songs and six original songs or adaptations by Cooder.

== Track listing ==
=== Side 1 ===
1. "Alimony" (Brenda Lee Jones, Welton Young, Robert Higginbotham) - 2:55
2. "France Chance" (Joe Callicott) - 2:45
3. "One Meat Ball" (Louis C. Singer, Hy Zaret; arranged by Van Dyke Parks) - 2:27
4. "Do Re Mi" (Woody Guthrie) - 3:03
5. "My Old Kentucky Home (Turpentine & Dandelion Wine)" (Randy Newman) - 1:45
6. "How Can a Poor Man Stand Such Times and Live?" (Alfred Reed) - 2:45

=== Side 2 ===
1. "Available Space" (instrumental) (Ry Cooder) - 2:11
2. "Pigmeat" (Huddie Ledbetter) - 3:07
3. "Police Dog Blues" (Arthur Blake; adapted by Ry Cooder) - 2:43
4. "Goin' to Brownsville" (John Estes; adapted by Ry Cooder) - 3:24
5. "Dark Is the Night" (instrumental) (Blind Willie Johnson; adapted by Ry Cooder) - 2:48

== Personnel ==
- Ry Cooder - guitars, vocals, mandolin, bass guitar
- Van Dyke Parks - piano
- Chris Ethridge (contribution not specified in sleeve notes) - bass guitar
- Richie Hayward (contribution not specified in sleeve notes) - drums
- Roy Estrada (contribution not specified in sleeve notes) - bass guitar
- Milt Holland (contribution not specified in sleeve notes) - drums, percussion
- John Barbata (contribution not specified in sleeve notes) - drums
- Max Bennett (contribution not specified in sleeve notes) - bass guitar
- Bobby Bruce (contribution not specified in sleeve notes) - violin
- Gloria Jones & Co. - backing vocals
- Kirby Johnson - orchestration and conductor on "One Meat Ball", "Do Re Mi", "Old Kentucky Home" and "How Can a Poor Man Stand Such Times and Live?"

== Production ==
- Van Dyke Parks - producer, arrangement on "One Meat Ball"
- Lenny Waronker - producer
- Judy Betz - production assistant
- Lee Herschberg - engineer, mix-down
- Doug Botnick - engineer
- Thaddeus James Lowe - engineer
- Rudy Hill - engineer
- Bob Kovach - engineer

== Other credits ==
- Airstream - for the 1937 trailer pictured on the front of the album sleeve
- Frank Bez - for the photo of the Airstream trailer (photographed at dry lake El Mirage)
- Susan Titelman - for the photo of Cooder on the back of the album sleeve
- Ed Thrasher - for art direction
- John Uomoto - for the title neon lettering

== Billboard charts ==
Chart	Peak
Pop albums	216
