= Van Dyke Parks =

American musician (born 1943)

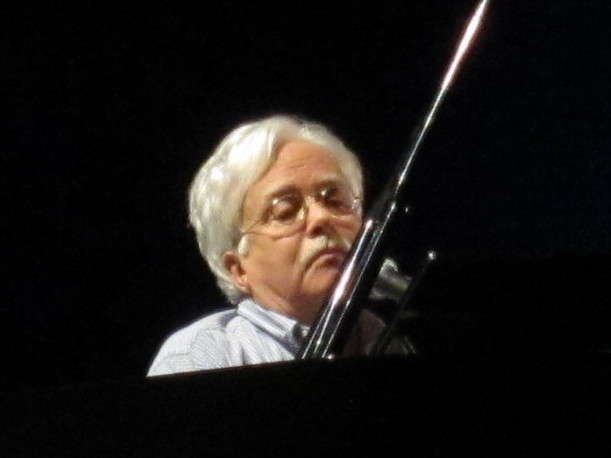
- Parks performing at Primavera Sound 2010

Background information
- Born: January 3, 1943 (age 83); Hattiesburg, Mississippi, U.S.
- Origin: Los Angeles, California, U.S.
- Genres: Pop; orchestral pop; art pop; experimental; Americana; Rock
- Occupations: Composer; songwriter; arranger; performer; record producer; actor
- Instruments: Keyboards; accordion; clarinet; vocals
- Years active: 1953–present
- Labels: MGM; Warner Bros.; Bananastan; Bella Union
- Formerly of: The Brandywine Singers; The Easy Riders; The Greenwood County Singers; The Mothers of Invention; The Steel Town Three
- Spouse: Sally Parks

Van Dyke Parks (born January 3, 1943) is an American musician, songwriter, arranger, record producer, and former Warner Bros. Records executive whose work encompasses orchestral pop, elaborate recording experiments, Americana iconography, free-associative lyrics, and Caribbean sounds. He is best known for his 1967 album Song Cycle and his collaborative work with acts such as the Beach Boys, Lowell George, Joanna Newsom, and Harry Nilsson.

Born in Hattiesburg, Mississippi, Parks toured nationally with the American Boychoir School in Princeton, New Jersey and concurrently pursued child acting roles in television and theater productions. After relocating to California in 1963, he performed folk music with his brother Carson along the West Coast and contributed arrangements to Disney film soundtracks, including "The Bare Necessities" for The Jungle Book (1967). By the mid-1960s, he was an active session musician in Laurel Canyon, working with artists such as Tim Buckley, Judy Collins, and the Byrds before collaborating with Brian Wilson on the Beach Boys' Smile, later completed in 2004 as Wilson's solo album.

In 1966, Parks joined Warner Bros. and formed part of a creative circle at the label through producer Lenny Waronker, with whom he collaborated on albums by Harpers Bizarre, Randy Newman, Arlo Guthrie, and Ry Cooder. By the early 1970s, Parks had transitioned to an executive role at Warner Bros., where he spearheaded the first ever label division centered on promotional films for artists. Influenced by the 1969 Santa Barbara oil spill, he concurrently pursued calypso and steel pan music in projects such as his album Discover America (1971), productions for Mighty Sparrow and the Esso Trinidad Steel Band, and Nilsson's mid-1970s recordings.

After the late 1970s, Parks focused on composing for film and television, contributing to works including Popeye (with Nilsson, 1980), Follow That Bird (1985), and The Brave Little Toaster (1987). He authored a trilogy of children's books based on his 1984 album Jump!, a musical adaptation of Br'er Rabbit folktales. He has remained active as a collaborator and arranger, working with artists such as Rufus Wainwright, Silverchair, and Joanna Newsom, while releasing three additional studio albums: Tokyo Rose (1989), Orange Crate Art (with Wilson, 1995), and Songs Cycled (2013).

== Background and child acting roles ==
Van Dyke Parks was born on January 3, 1943 in Hattiesburg, Mississippi, briefly residing in Lake Charles, Louisiana. He is the youngest of four musically inclined brothers, all of whom played brass instruments. His father, Richard Parks, a neurologist and psychiatrist mentored by Karl Menninger, was one of the first to integrate African-American patients into a segregated Southern hospital. Richard had played in John Philip Sousa's Sixty Silver Trumpets and financed his medical education by leading the dance band Dick Parks and the White Swan Serenaders. Van Dyke's mother was a Hebraic scholar. Parks began playing clarinet at age four and demonstrated early proficiency on the family piano.

In the early 1950s, Parks attended the American Boychoir School in Princeton, New Jersey, as a boarding student. There, he studied voice and piano, serving as a coloratura vocalist. The choir performed nationwide, and Parks sang under conductors Arturo Toscanini, Thomas Beecham, and Eugene Ormandy. He also portrayed the title role in Gian Carlo Menotti’s opera Amahl and the Night Visitors with the New York City and Philadelphia Opera companies.

Parks concurrently pursued child acting to fund his education. He appeared in the 1953 NBC series Bonino as the son of opera baritone Ezio Pinza's character, and in the early so-called "lost episodes" of TV's The Honeymooners (originally presented on The Jackie Gleason Show), as little Tommy Borden. His film credits include The Swan (1956), starring Grace Kelly, and a Broadway performance in S. N. Behrman's The Cold Wind alongside Eli Wallach and Maureen Stapleton. Parks later stated, "I paid my tuition doing it, but I was only interested in music".

== Early career (1963–1966) ==
=== Folk groups and Disney gigs ===
In 1960, Parks enrolled at the Carnegie Institute, majoring in composition and performance, and studying under Aaron Copland. In 1963, he shifted focus to the requinto guitar and relocated to California to form the folk duo the Steel Town Two with his brother Carson. The pair performed along the California coast, from San Diego to Santa Barbara, initially earning $7.50 per night at venues such as Hermosa Beach's Insomniac Café, where they appeared alongside acts including the Andrew de la Bastide Steel Band, Bessie Griffin and the Gospel Pearls, and the Chambers Brothers. David Crosby attended a Santa Barbara performance, remarking to associate David Lindley, "If they can get away with it, so can we." Parks also performed acoustic folk music at the Prison of Socrates coffeehouse on Balboa Peninsula while the Beach Boys played simultaneously at the nearby Rendezvous Ballroom. Though Parks had not actively followed the band's music, he was familiar with their radio hits, later recalling their performances and the enthusiastic crowds they drew as an "eye-opening" experience that "changed [his] life".

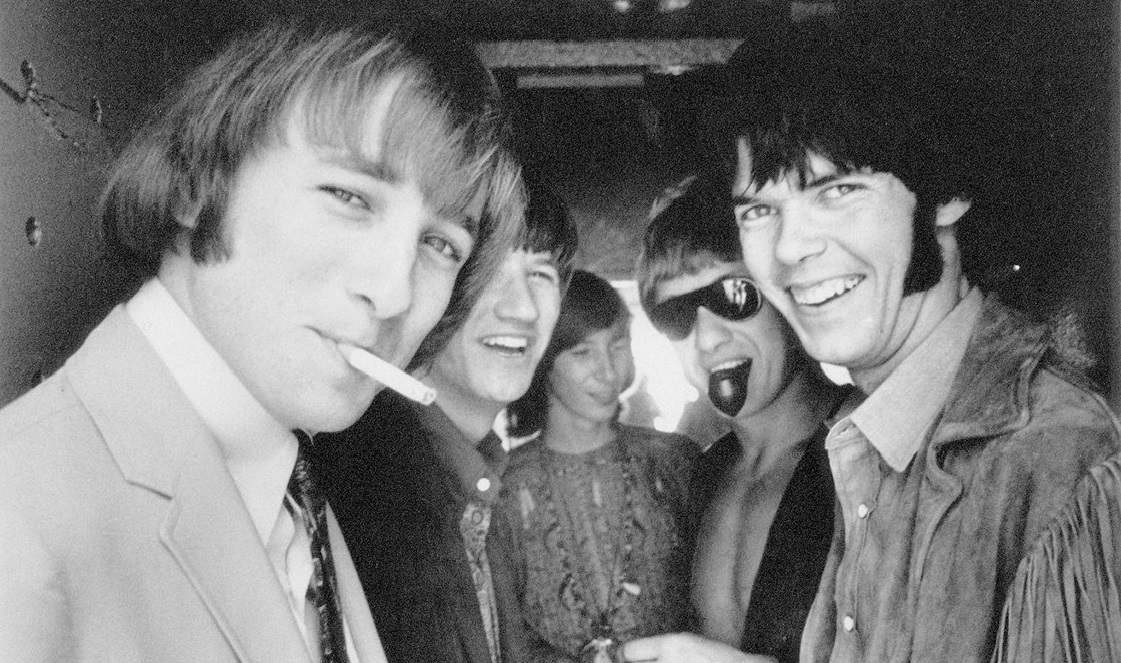
Parks briefly formed a guitar trio with Stephen Stills (left) and Steve Young (not present) in 1966. Stills' later band Buffalo Springfield (pictured) was named by Parks, inspired by a bulldozer logo.

Immersing himself in Southern California's folk scene, Parks met guitarist Stephen Stills and singer-songwriter Steve Young during these years. He also toured New England as a member of the Brandywine Singers and was a member of the Greenwood County Singers, participating on their first two Kapp Records albums, as well as songwriter Terry Gilkyson's group the Easy Riders. (Note: Gilkyson's "Memories are Made of This" was a particular favorite of Parks as a child.) After recruiting a standup bass player, the renamed Steel Town Three secured a residency at West Hollywood's Troubadour nightclub, earning $750 weekly (equivalent to $7,890 in 2025).

In 1963, Parks' brother Benjamin Riley Parks, a French horn player and the youngest State Department employee at the time, died in a car accident in Frankfurt, Germany. The circumstances surrounding the incident raised speculation of Cold War connections due to Benjamin's interest in Russian culture, according to author Richard Henderson. (Note: Parks channeled this subject in his later song "By the People".) Shortly afterward, Gilkyson commissioned Parks to arrange "The Bare Necessities" for Disney's The Jungle Book (1967), providing funds that enabled Parks and Carson to attend Benjamin's funeral." This session at Los Angeles' Sunset Sound Recorders was Parks' first paid recording work. He subsequently played and arranged on other Disney soundtracks, including Savage Sam (1963) and The Moon-Spinners (1964), while Sunset Sound hosted much of his recordings through the 2000s.

=== "High Coin", MGM singles, and Laurel Canyon scene ===
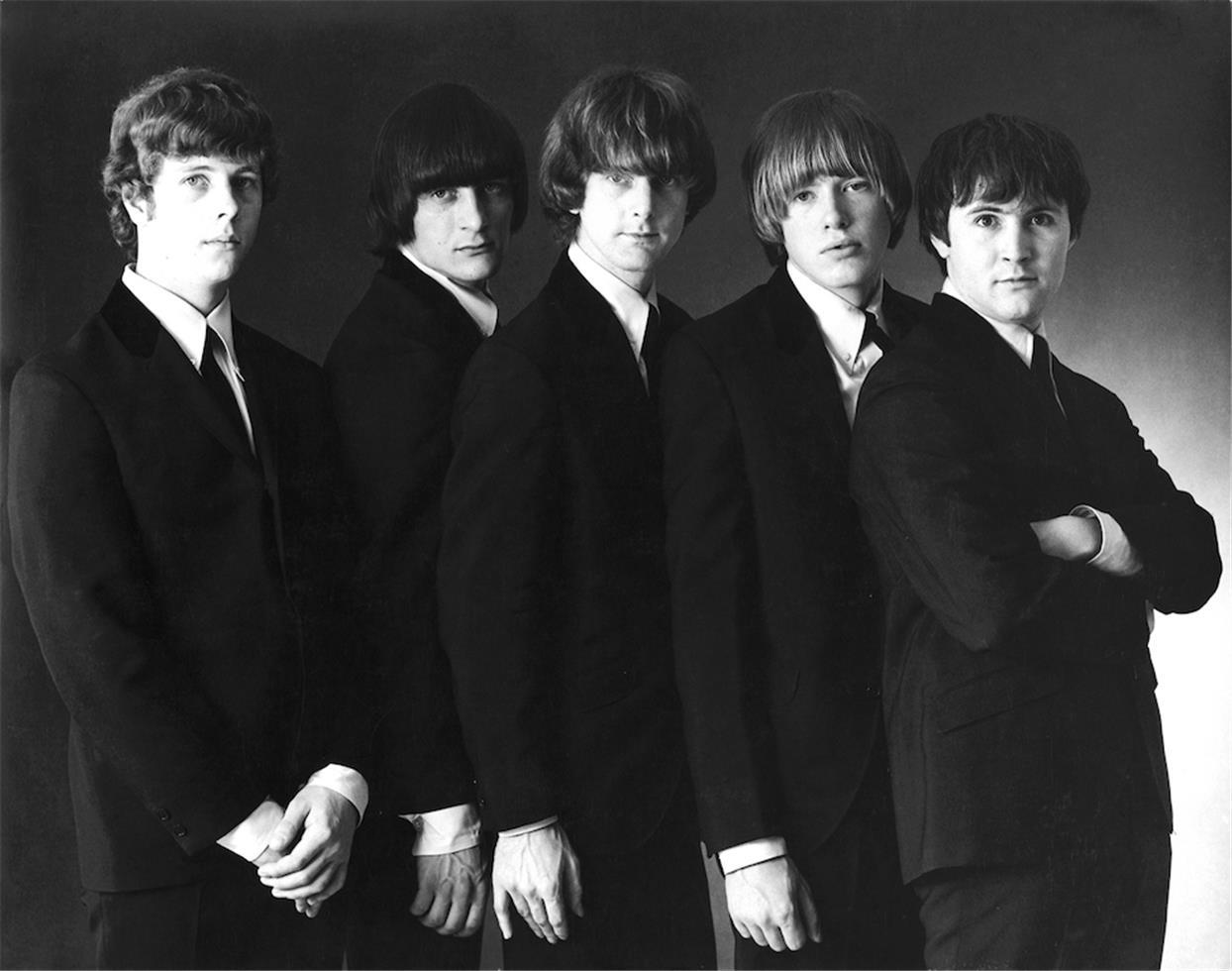
Parks jammed with members of the Byrds (pictured in 1965) before contributing keyboards to their studio albums

By the mid-1960s, Parks had become a fixture in Hollywood's bohemian music scene, hosting gatherings at his Melrose Avenue apartment above a hardware store owned by the parents of Sunset Sound staff engineers Bruce and Doug Botnick. He frequently played piano at the Troubadour alongside musicians such as Danny Hutton, then a talent scout for Hanna-Barbera Music, and future Byrds bandleader Roger McGuinn. Hutton recalled first encountering Parks at a Troubadour-related party around 1963; Parks later named Hutton's band Three Dog Night.

Parks recalled an influx of aspiring musicians into Laurel Canyon after 1964, which he attributed to the commercial breakthroughs of local acts such as the Byrds. The Beatles' Hollywood Bowl appearance that same year and the Rolling Stones’ American release 12 × 5 convinced him that major labels were poised to commodify blues music, and he later stated that 12 × 5 together with Bob Dylan's 1962 self-titled debut album had a "great impact on anybody who was thinking about a future in music, as I was. It wasn't serious music, but it carried a message, and we all joined the message." He subsequently pursued songwriting more actively and penned the song "High Coin", first recorded by Rick Jarrard and released in late 1965, with subsequent recordings by Bobby Vee, the West Coast Pop Art Experimental Band, Jackie DeShannon, and the Charlatans.

Some people got paid a lot of money to bottle the rebellion of the 60s, and that's when [rock music] started to mean zero to me. But I was still with the music, and the biggest event of that era for me was the singular person Brian Wilson. He was the force.

— Van Dyke Parks, 2011

In 1965, Parks made regular appearances on the ABC talk show The Les Crane Show. (Note: Les Crane described Parks as the "only man I know who speaks in stream-of-consciousness.") That December, Hutton facilitated a meeting between MGM Records talent scout David Anderle and Parks, leading Anderle to manage Parks and secure a contract with MGM. Parks subsequently became part of a small circle of musicians and creatives who helped forge the emerging rock milieu of Laurel Canyon, later suggesting that their gatherings, alongside figures such as Hutton and Anderle, had created "a social nexus" that drew other artists to the area. In the same month, Crosby invited Parks to Beach Boys leader Brian Wilson's home in Beverly Hills, marking their first meeting. Parks later recalled that Wilson was working on Pet Sounds (1966) and previewed the track "Sloop John B" for him: "I don't even think he had the voices on yet, but I heard that long rotational breathing, that long flute ostinato at the beginning... I knew that this man was a great musician." Parks later cited Pet Sounds as the only "striking [work] coming out of the United States" at the time. Dismayed by the British Invasion, he later stated: "There was such an antipathy toward all things American. And I thought it would be really squaresville to investigate [...] America."

In 1966, Parks briefly signed with MGM under A&R executive Tom Wilson. The label issued two singles by Parks: "Come to the Sunshine", referencing his father's dance band, and "Number Nine", a folk-rock adaptation of Beethoven's "Ode to Joy" credited to "the Van Dyke Parks". Los Angeles Free Press journalist Paul Jay Robbins translated the original German text into English for "Number Nine", while the lyrics of the B-side "Do What You Wanta" were written by Hutton. The singles received little attention; Richard Henderson writes that their "lyric sleight-of-hand, vivacious melodies, and pell-mell arrangements" cemented the template for Parks' subsequent work.

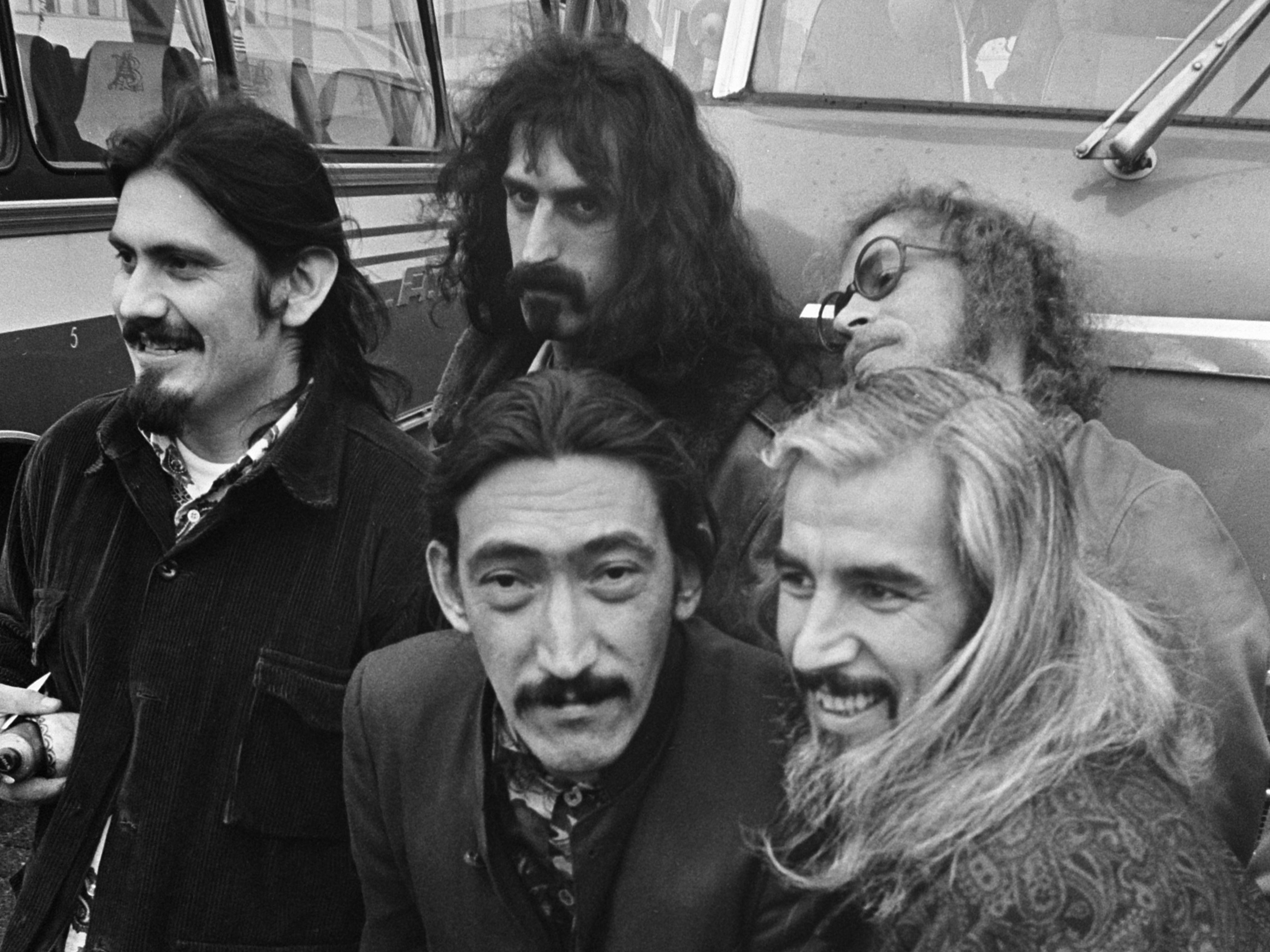
Parks (not present) was briefly a member of the Mothers of Invention in 1966

"Come to the Sunshine" reached number 16 on regional charts in Phoenix, Arizona, prompting Parks to perform there as an opening act for the Lovin' Spoonful under the name "the Van Dyke Parks". He was joined by Stills and Steve Young, all three playing guitar, though the band immediately dissolved. Parks was also briefly a member of Frank Zappa's Mothers of Invention prior to the recording of their album Freak Out! (1966), contributing three arrangements before leaving due to disinterest in performing before raucous audiences and disagreements with Zappa. (Note: He later stated that these arrangements, alongside "a canceled check", amounted to the only remaining evidence he had played alongside bandmates Elliot Ingber, Jimmy Carl Black, and Roy Estrada. According to Parks, "Frank had a nickname for everybody. I was called 'Pinocchio.'")

=== Studio session work and Smile ===
Parks established himself as a versatile keyboardist at studio session dates, playing alongside artists ranging from folk singers Judy Collins and Tim Buckley to the Melcher-produced Byrds and Paul Revere and the Raiders. Ry Cooder joined Parks on these studio dates. On the Byrds' single "5D (Fifth Dimension)", the title song of their 1966 album, Parks contributed Hammond organ. He also appeared on Gene Clark's solo debut, Gene Clark with the Gosdin Brothers (1967).

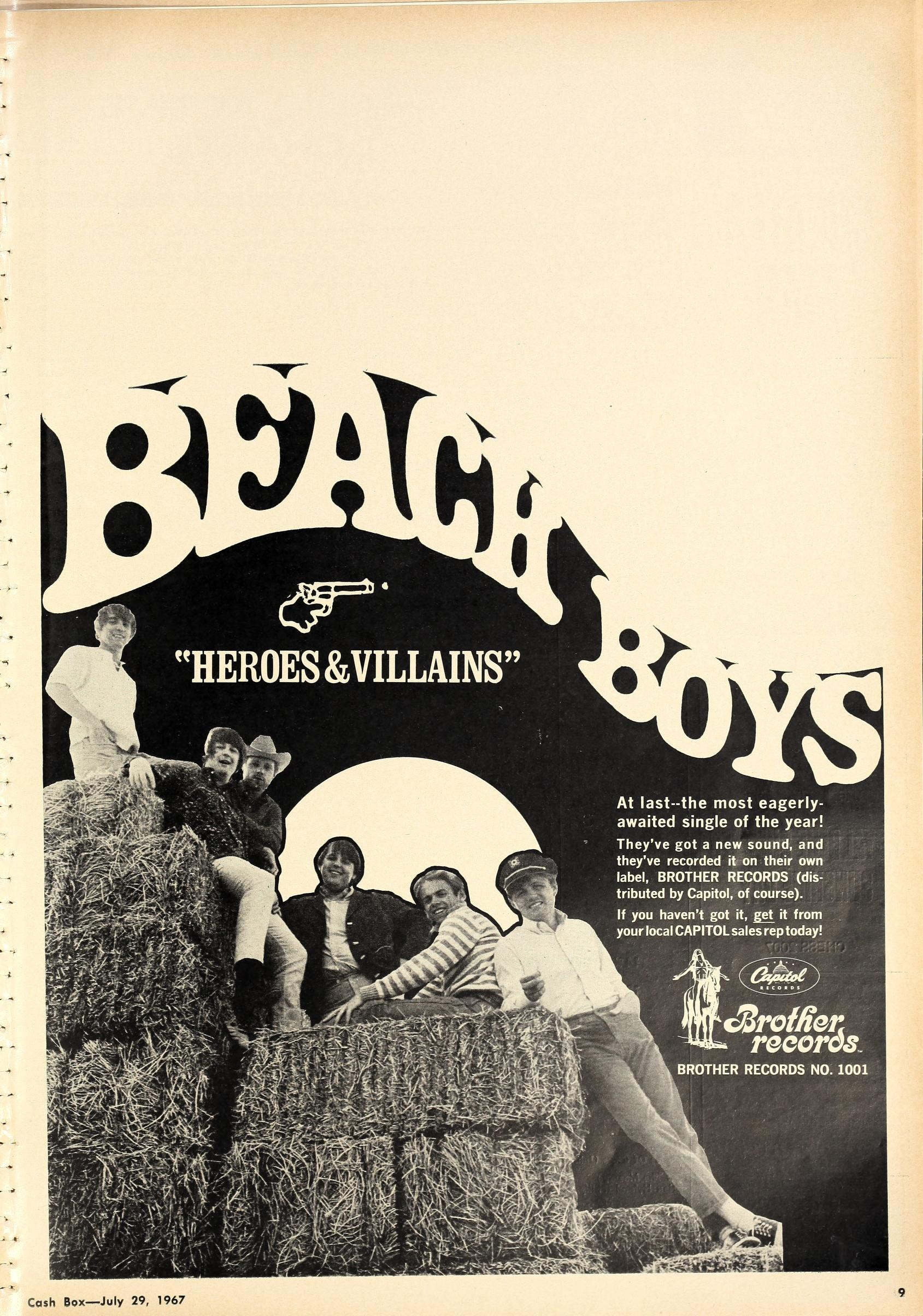
1967 advertisement for the Beach Boys' single "Heroes and Villains", written by Parks and Brian Wilson

Through Melcher, Parks reconnected with Brian Wilson several months after their first meeting. (Note: Biographer Peter Ames Carlin states that Parks had previously encountered Wilson on several more occasions through mutual acquaintance Loren Schwartz. Parks recalled, "Brian sought me out because he had heard about me from some mutual friends, a neighborly couple who later fell into disrepute with the Wilson clan because they were experimenting with psychedelics. People who experimented with psychedelics—no matter who they were—were viewed as 'enlightened people,' and Brian sought out the enlightened people.") Impressed by his articulate manner, Wilson, seeking a new lyricist, later offered him a collaboration on the Beach Boys' next album, soon titled Smile at Parks' suggestion. Parks had attended some "Good Vibrations" recording sessions, and believed that his input regarding the song's cello, initially recorded in June 1966, convinced Wilson of their shared creative sensibilities. Writing together at Wilson's home, their collaboration terms included Wilson purchasing Parks a $5,000 Volvo to address his transportation needs (equivalent to $50,000 in 2025). (Note: Financial constraints at the time had left Parks and his wife residing in a garage apartment lacking private bathroom facilities.)

Parks was granted significant creative autonomy on the project's thematic direction, drawing inspiration from the Beat Generation and contemporary folk revival. He introduced Wilson to Anderle, who helped develop the band's Brother Records imprint, and Derek Taylor who became the band's publicist. Frank Holmes, who illustrated the album's planned cover artwork and sleeve booklet, was additionally recruited through Parks, who later identified Holmes as "a third part of the equation", describing Holmes' contributions as integral to realizing the album's "musical cartoon" aesthetic. (Note: Parks also introduced Wilson to Robbins and magazine reporter Michael Vosse, the latter briefly serving as Wilson's professional assistant.) Parks additionally contributed piano to many of the recording sessions, as well as marimba (on "Wind Chimes").

Smile was never finished by the Beach Boys. Parks withdrew from the project, in his words, "as soon as I realized [the situation] was causing friction between Brian and the group". The band substituted its release with Smiley Smile in September 1967, an album that had no involvement from Parks beyond his preliminary work on the original Smile material. Two Smiley Smile tracks—"Wonderful" and "Wind Chimes"—were not officially recognized as his co-written songs until 2004. (Note: Parks had reported no publishing royalties received from his co-written songs for the Beach Boys by the early 1980s.)

== Initial Warner Bros. period (1966–1971) ==
=== Waronker collaborations and Song Cycle ===
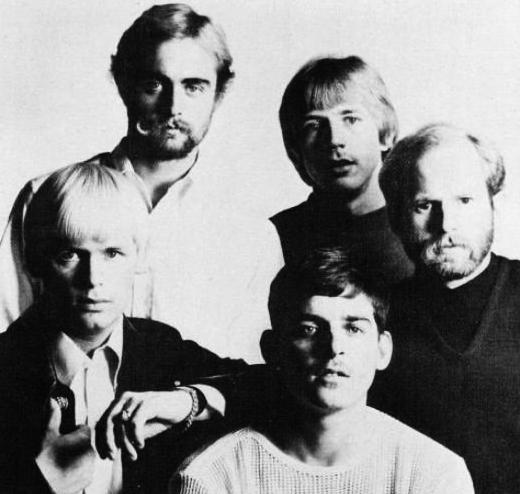
Parks rechristened the Tikis as Harpers Bizarre (pictured 1967)

Parks joined Warner Bros. Records through producer Lenny Waronker, a young A&R executive mentored by Reprise Records president Mo Ostin. After Seven Arts Productions had acquired Warner Bros. in 1966, the record division rebranded as Warner Bros.-Seven Arts under president Joe Smith. Waronker, whose father co-founded Liberty Records, was tasked with overseeing artists acquired during Warner Bros.' 1966 purchase of Autumn Records, including the Mojo Men, the Beau Brummels, and the Tikis. He assembled a team featuring Parks, songwriter Randy Newman, and keyboardist Leon Russell. Parks initially questioned Waronker's "filthy-rich" background but was convinced by his professional trust, including a loaned sports car, and a solo contract offer. He later said that Waronker had sought him out because of his association to Brian Wilson: "He's never admitted that to me, but it's no offense to him to say that."

Seeking to distance the group from associations with surf music, then considered passé, Parks proposed renaming the Tikis to Harpers Bizarre to reflect his appreciation for Cole Porter and Depression-era songwriting. He arranged and performed on Harpers Bizarre's first two albums for Warner Bros., Feelin' Groovy and Anything Goes (both 1967). The latter included their rendition of "High Coin" and Porter's "Anything Goes". During sessions for the Mojo Men, Parks experimented with eight-track recording technology, drafting arrangements on butcher paper in a style likened by Henderson to Jack Kerouac's manuscripts. Waronker encouraged experimental approaches, which he summarized as "Go in with a good song and weird it out." The resulting singles "The 59th Street Bridge Song (Feelin' Groovy)" (a national Top 10 hit for Harpers Bizarre) and "Sit Down, I Think I Love You" (written by Stills and arranged by Parks for the Mojo Men, reaching regional charts), convinced the label of the group's ability. Parks produced Harpers Bizarre's version of "Come to the Sunshine", their follow-up single.

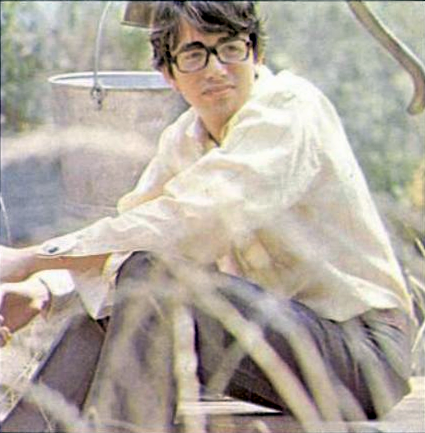
Parks in a 1967 promotional shot

Warner Bros. financed the recording of Parks' rendition of Donovan's song "Colours", credited under the pseudonym "George Washington Brown", as a test single. (Note: A myth emerged around the pseudonym after Cheetah magazine reported musicians speculating that "Brown" was a wealthy South American financier directing Parks remotely.) After journalist Richard Goldstein praised the record in the Village Voice, the company greenlit a full solo album but required Parks to use his real name. On January 5, 1967, he signed a multi-album contract with Warner Bros., an agreement that included a substantial recording budget, full creative control, and no set deadlines. This was an extraordinary allowance for an artist like Parks, comparable to the largesses afforded to the Beatles.

"Palm Desert" from Song Cycle (1967)
Parks drew from the folk-inspired chamber works of Percy Grainger and the spatial recording techniques of Juan García Esquivel when creating tracks like "Palm Desert", a tribute to the Coachella Valley city where Parks wrote Song Cycle.

By April, Parks had withdrawn from the Smile project to focus on his debut album, Song Cycle, recorded over seven months with sessions produced by Waronker, engineered by Lee Herschberg and Doug Botnick, and mixed by Bruce Botnick. A concept album centered on Hollywood and Southern California, it was one of the most expensive albums ever produced, costing approximately $80,000 (equivalent to $770,000 in 2025). Parks characterized his studio approach as "the quick brown fox jumps over the lazy dog", explaining that his techniques had been molded by observing Wilson's practice of recording single tracks across multiple studios to maximize his sonic palette: "It wasn't necessary to me to be where they were firing the biggest guns. But to me, to be at a place where there was a good gun with a great shot." At Parks' commission, Newman wrote the opening track "Vine Street".

Upon release, Song Cycle elicited positive reviews from critics associated with the New Journalism movement, but yielded confusion from retailers, radio programmers, and the label's marketing staff. To address poor sales, the company, without consulting Parks, launched an unconventional ad campaign declaring the album a commercial flop. According to Parks, "there was every expectation that the recording costs would be recovered, and they were, within three years." (Note: Creative Services director Stan Cornyn, who initiated the campaign, later ensured that tracks from Song Cycle and Parks' commercial scoring work, such as compositions for Ice Capades and Datsun advertisements, later appeared on Warner Bros.' mail-order Loss Leader series through the 1970s. These commercial scores were among the earliest recordings that employed a Moog Synthesizer.)

We didn't know whom we were selling Ry [Cooder] or Randy [Newman] to, it was strictly on a wing and a prayer, but we did our darnedest to sell them anyway.

— Van Dyke Parks

After completing Song Cycle Parks relocated to Laurel Canyon and co-produced Newman's 1968 self-titled debut album with Waronker, which faced a similar reception. (Note: To Parks' disappointment, Newman's follow-up album, 12 Songs (1970), abandoned orchestration and excluded his involvement as co-producer.) The Parks-Waronker production team reunited for folk singer Arlo Guthrie's 1969 album Running Down the Road, featuring contributions from Los Angeles session musicians such as Ry Cooder. They then produced Cooder's 1970 self-titled debut album, containing an ornate orchestral rendition of "One Meat Ball" arranged by Parks. (Note: Cooder later expressed dissatisfaction with the album's elaborate production, opting for a stripped-down approach on his 1972 follow-up, Into the Purple Valley, produced solely by Waronker.)

=== Beach Boys and Little Feat signings ===
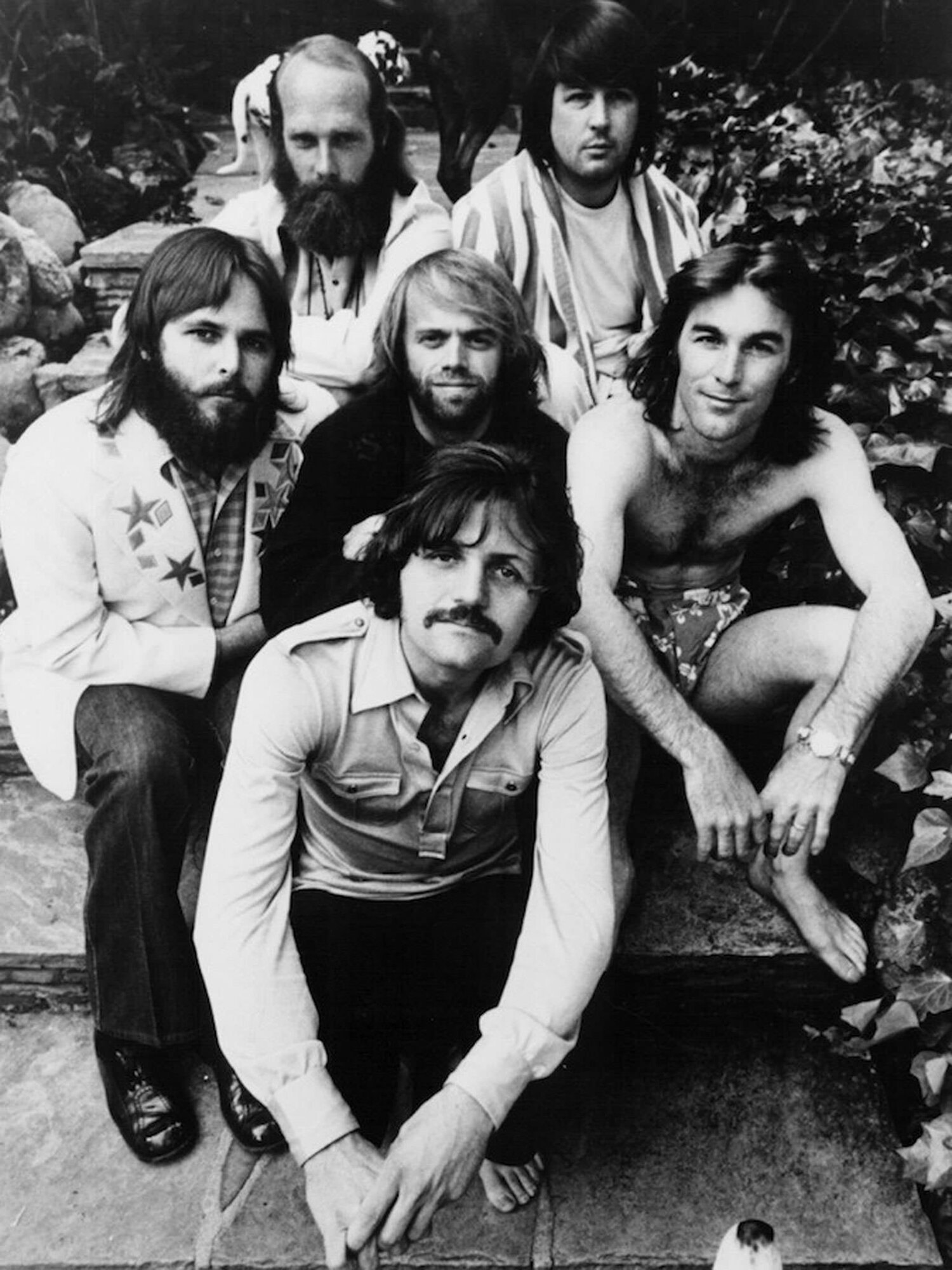
Parks advocated for the Beach Boys' signing with Warner-Reprise

Following the Beach Boys' departure from Capitol Records, the band signed to Reprise in 1969 through a deal brokered by Parks. Amid concerns about the group's contractual complexities and declining record sales, Parks later stated that he "put [his] job on the line" to facilitate the deal. The band's second album for the label, Surf's Up (1971), included the title track, co-written by Parks originally for Smile, and "A Day in the Life of a Tree", featuring Parks singing part of the coda.

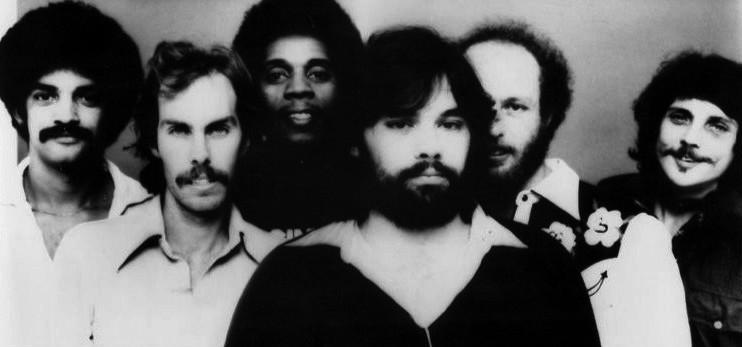
Little Feat in 1975. Parks forged a friendship and songwriting partnership with bandleader Lowell George (front)

In the 1970s, Parks collaborated extensively with Little Feat founder Lowell George, contributing to the band's recordings and co-writing material throughout the decade. Parks and George first met during sessions for the Fraternity of Man's second album Get It On! (1969), which featured future Little Feat members Richie Hayward and George's songwriting collaborator Martin Kibbee. Their friendship grew after Little Feat's self-titled 1971 debut album, with Parks periodically co-writing, producing, and advising George on music business matters.

After Warner Bros. had considered dropping the band, Parks invited George to contribute guitar to his forthcoming follow-up to Song Cycle and record their collaborative song "Sailin' Shoes", with the results later reaffirming Little Feat's value to Warner Bros. (Note: Accounts differ on the extent of the pair's collaboration on "Sailin' Shoes". George described a spontaneous creative breakthrough during a session with Parks, whereas Parks recalled initiating the title and developing the music with George during Discover America recordings, with George later finalizing the song structure. Despite Parks' contributions, the song was solely credited to George.) Hayward later stated, "Van Dyke Parks got us our record deal and produced us. He's an amazing human being—the Oscar Levant of rock music. [...] He's old school. You can tell by his violin scores." (Note: Conversely, Kibbee attributed the label's renewed interest to the commercial potential of George's co-written song "Easy to Slip".)

=== Executive promotion, music video pioneering, and other signings ===
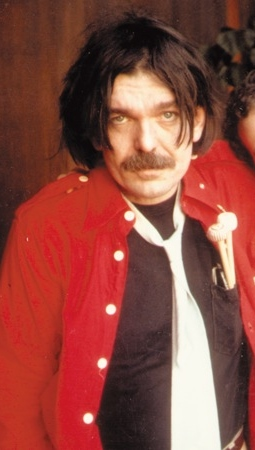
Parks pioneered the modern music video through films created for acts such as Captain Beefheart in the early 1970s

From the late 1960s to early 1970s, Parks transitioned to an executive role at Warner Bros., having proposed alternative revenue streams to reduce artists' reliance on touring. He spearheaded the creation of Audio-Visual Services, a division producing promotional films for acts such as Zappa, Joni Mitchell, Earth, Wind & Fire, and Captain Beefheart. (Note: Films were also created for Cooder, Newman, the Esso Trinidad Steel Band, and Little Feat.) Directors and crews were recruited from the advertising industry to realize these projects, intended for screening before Warner Bros. theatrical features and potential educational or cable television distribution. The films combined performance footage with surrealist visuals, exemplified by Beefheart's Lick My Decals Off short. Parks was appointed as the division's head in August 1970. According to Henderson,

Song-length, musical film shorts called Panoram Soundies had been tried in a jukebox-style format by the Mills Novelty Co. during the 1940s, and the Beatles filmed promotional TV/movie theater clips in 1967–68 [...] but no record company had ever established an in-house department for the production of what would prove the forerunner of music videos.

The division dissolved by mid-1971. According to some writers, Ostin deemed the initiative financially unsustainable due to limited distribution avenues and costs exceeding $500,000 (equivalent to $3.97 million in 2025). Parks stated in a 2013 interview that only one of the films produced had exceeded costs of $18,500: "I provided that each artist would get 25% of the net profits of the rentals or sales. [...] Warners soon tired of what I thought was a fair equation of participation in creative profits, and basically isolated me to the extent that I left."

Parks had achieved the kind of oracular stature at the company that transcends any one title or job. His opinion was sought out on matters large and small. He was heavily involved in A&R decisions [...].

— In Heaven Everything Is Fine: The Unsolved Life of Peter Ivers and the Lost History of New Wave Theatre (2009)

Unrealized plans included a dedicated cable channel; internal memos from Parks referenced early concepts for what became Music Television, including the phrase "I want my music television" and the acronym "MTV". Parks remained under Ostin, later saying, "I was directly under Mo Ostin at WB Records [...] I answered to only one man. That was Mo." His initiatives had also extended to facilitating logistical support for filming at the 1969 Woodstock Festival, though he later distanced himself from the festival: "I had other priorities than queuing at a rock concert's mud flat latrine."

In 1970, Parks and Newman recommended electronic music duo Beaver & Krause to Smith, leading to their signing. In 1972, Parks became involved in the career of musician Peter Ivers through mutual associate Buell Neidlinger. Parks admired Ivers' songwriting and technical skill on harmonica, leading to Ivers signing with Warner Bros. and recording his third album, Terminal Love (1974). Ivers also contributed as a session musician on Parks' projects.

== Caribbean-focused era and further collaborative work (1970–1976) ==
The 1969 Santa Barbara oil spill profoundly influenced Parks' artistic direction, prompting him to pursue environmental and racial justice causes through his work and deepen his engagement with Caribbean music. He sought to elevate the recognition of Caribbean traditions, particularly calypso and steel pan, as vehicles for political consciousness, and to subvert the oil industry's cultural influence. From 1970 to 1975, he promoted West Indian music in the U.S., however, logistical challenges in touring with a large steel band and resistance from corporate interests hindered broader acceptance.

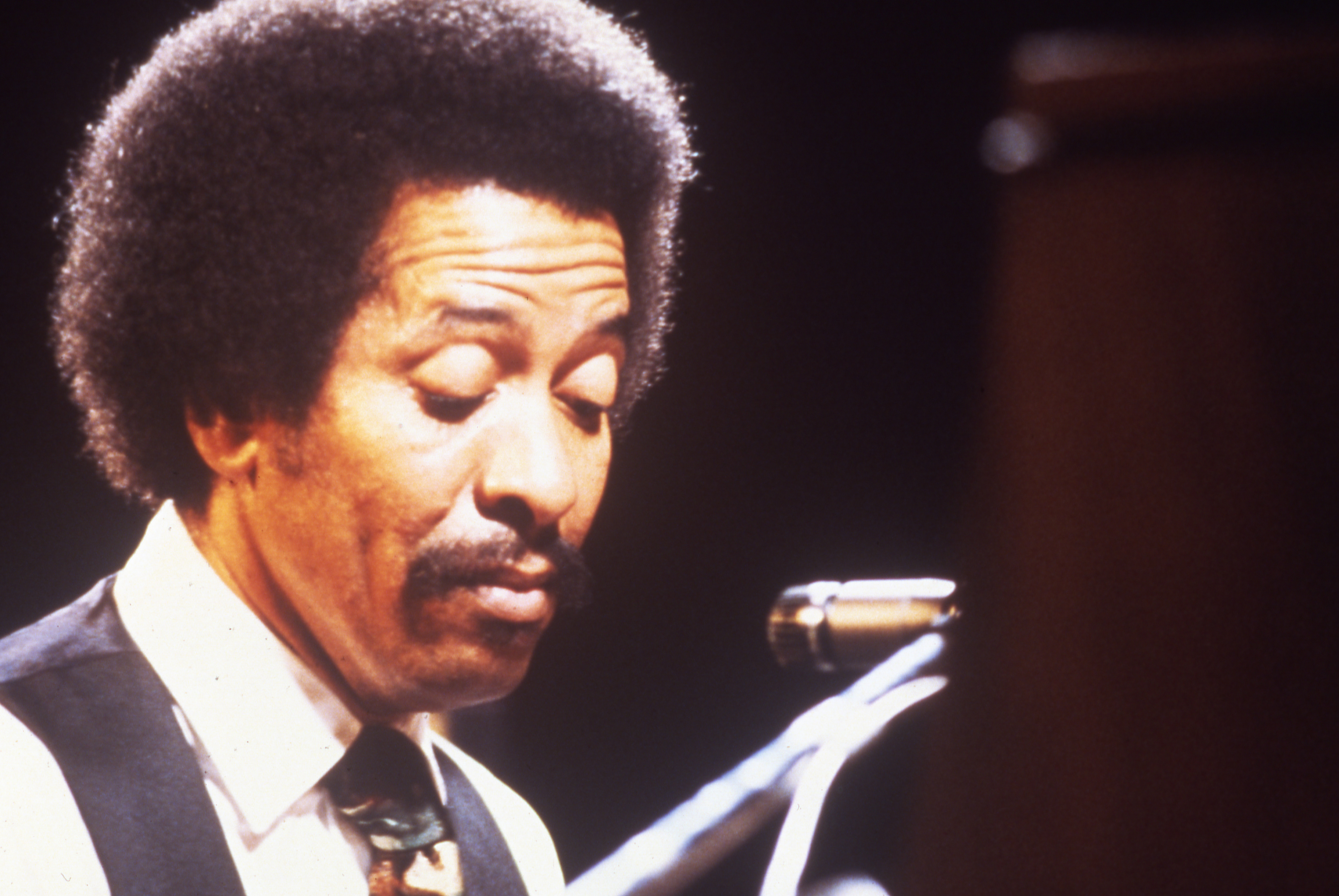
Parks included two renditions of Allen Toussaint songs on Discover America (1971). He later produced Toussaint's 1975 album Southern Nights

Parks produced the Esso Trinidad Steel Band's 1971 album of covers by artists like the Kinks and the Jackson 5, as well as the 1974 calypso collection Hot & Sweet by Trinidadian artist Mighty Sparrow. He dedicated the Esso Trinidad Steel Band's album to Prince Bernhard of the World Wildlife Fund as part of his environmental advocacy: "Everything was directed to making it a proper, political, green album." Parks' second album, Discover America (1972), reinterpreted Trinidadian calypso standards alongside compositions by songwriters such as Allen Toussaint and the sole original "Sailin' Shoes". He delayed the album's release to allow Little Feat's version of the song to debut first on their second album Sailin' Shoes (1972). Parks' focus on calypso during this period also led to friction with Bob Marley, whose requests for production assistance he declined.

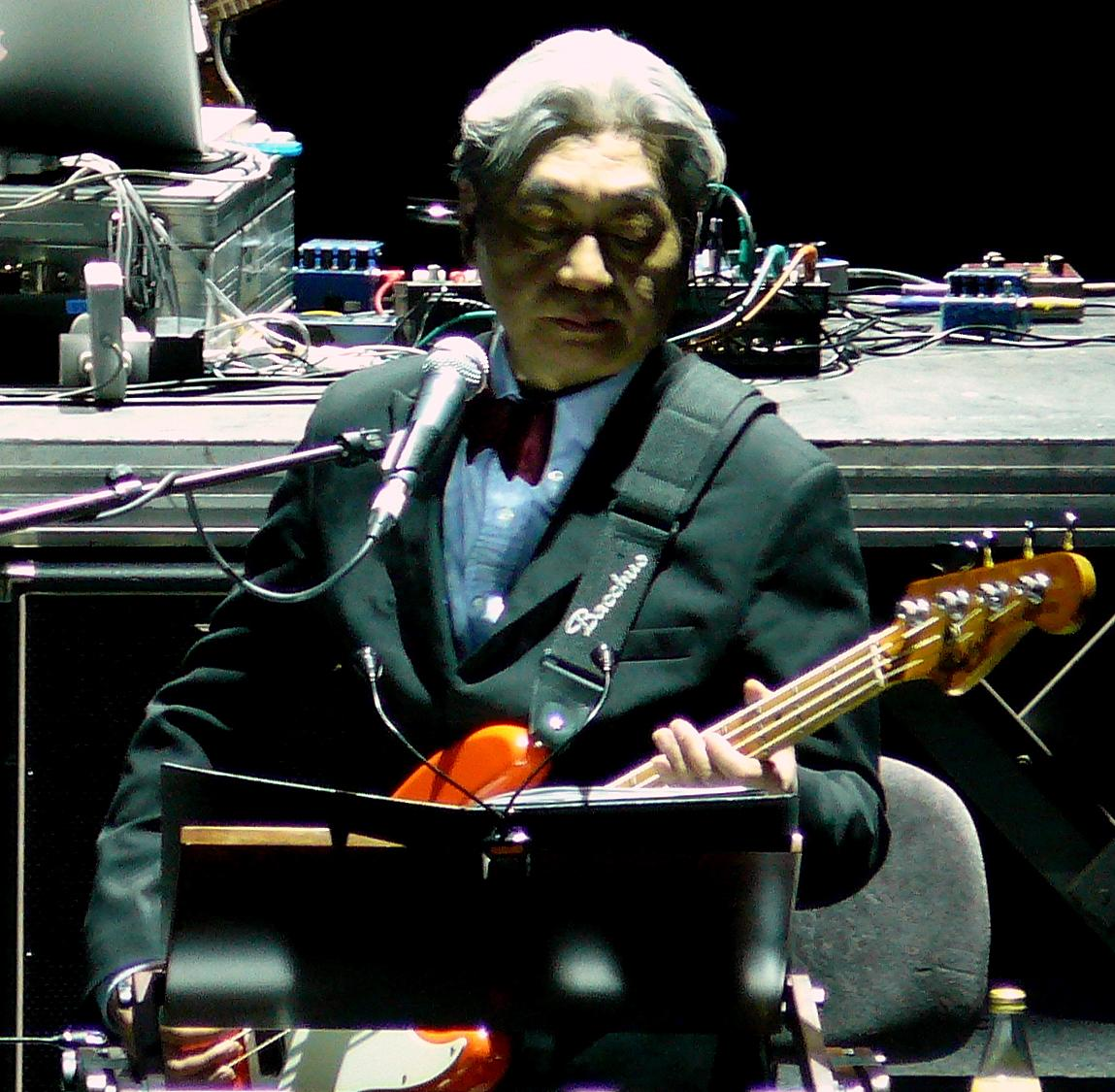
Happy End member Haruomi Hosono (pictured with Yellow Magic Orchestra in 2010) later performed with Parks at concerts

While recording the Discover America version of "Sailin' Shoes", Parks and George encountered the Japanese band Happy End, who visited their studio unannounced. Parks later recounted that the group had sought guidance on creating "the California Sound". Though initially hesitant due to his workload, George noticed a briefcase filled with cash brought by Happy End's representatives, prompting an impromptu collaboration. The two wrote "Goodbye America, Goodbye Japan" ("さよならアメリカ さよならニッポン", "Sayonara America Sayonara Nippon"), which became a chart-topping hit in Japan, while Parks produced Happy End's final album, Happy End (1973). This marked the first meeting between Parks' and band member Haruomi Hosono, who later performed alongside Parks at numerous concerts in Japan.

Parks' third album, Clang of the Yankee Reaper (1976), co-produced with Andrew Wickham and Trevor Lawrence, revisited calypso music while exploring themes of British colonial influence in the Caribbean. It featured one original composition alongside reimagined Trinidadian songs. Limited production resources led to scaled-back arrangements, including the use of an ARP String Synthesizer instead of live orchestration. The sessions were further affected by the death of a close friend of Parks prior to recording; he later dismissed the album as "brain-dead", disowning it in subsequent years.

Parks was the primary composer of the Beach Boys' 1973 single "Sail On, Sailor", which reached number 79 on the Billboard charts. (Note: Some later pressings omitted Parks' credit.) He joined initial recording sessions for Little Feat's fourth album Feats Don't Fail Me Now at Hollywood's Sound Factory between January and March 1974. The track "Spanish Moon", produced by Parks and co-written with George, featured a prominent Parks-assisted horn arrangement by Tower of Power and other production elements distinguishing the track from the remainder of the album. A truncated version of the song was released as a single in March 1975. Parks' involvement did not extend beyond these early sessions, having sparked tensions with Warner Bros. due to budgetary disputes, as recalled by George, who added that Parks "was going to do more" before the band "got stuck [and] broke up for about two weeks". (Note: These Parks-produced sessions additionally yielded two unreleased outtakes, both later included on the 2000 compilation Hotcakes & Outtakes.) The album's title origin remains contested between Parks and guitarist Paul Barrère. Alongside members of Little Feat, Parks also contributed to Kathy Dalton's 1973 solo debut Amazing and Howdy Moon's 1974 self-titled album.

My life basically gravitated toward [Harry Nilsson], who was truly a genius-- the smartest guy I ever met in the music business. He turned my head around because he could be retro without shame.

— Van Dyke Parks, 2011

Parks collaborated extensively with singer-songwriter Harry Nilsson, contributing to albums such as Nilsson Schmilsson (1971), where he played accordion on "The Moonbeam Song", and Duit on Mon Dei (1975), where he provided Caribbean-inspired arrangements after completing Clang of the Yankee Reaper. (Note: Nilsson covered "Vine Street" on his 1970 album Nilsson Sings Newman, with Newman on piano.) He introduced Nilsson to steel pan player and Desperadoes Steel Orchestra member Robert Greenidge prior to the recording of Duit on Mon Dei and performed piano on several tracks. (Note: Parks helped Nilsson assemble the bulk of the album, excluding "What's Your Sign?", "Salmon Falls", and "Down By the Sea", which were orchestrated by Perry Botkin, Jr.) His involvement extended to the 1975 follow-up Sandman, where he expanded Nilsson's "Jesus Christ, You're Tall", and whose Voorman-designed sleeve featured caricatures of Parks and other members of the studio ensemble.

Having brought Toussaint to Warners' attention via Discover America, Parks traveled to Louisiana to work on Toussaint's 1975 album Southern Nights, though he was ultimately denied a production credit due to intervention by Toussaint's management. That year, Parks and Brian Wilson recorded "Come to the Sunshine", intended for the Beach Boys album that became 15 Big Ones (1976), but the recording was lost. In 1976, he appeared as one of the interviewees in the band's NBC television special It's OK!.

== Shift to television and film (1978–1990s) ==
Having ensconced himself in the American southeast by the late 1970s, Parks returned to Los Angeles after being commissioned by Jack Nicholson to compose the score for Goin' South (1978), which Nicholson directed. The film's music, characterized by unconventional instrumentation and silent-film-era piano motifs, echoed the style of Parks' earlier solo work, particularly Song Cycle. This project marked his shift toward film composition, though his later screen scores seldom retained the sonic signatures of his standalone recordings.

George's 1979 solo debut, Thanks, I'll Eat It Here, included "Cheek to Cheek", a song co-written with Parks. Little Feat biographer Mark Brend surmised that the track "Himmler's Ring", written by Jimmy Webb, was arranged by Parks, citing a resemblance to Discover America. Parks' partnership with Nilsson continued with Flash Harry (1980), an album that reunited the extant RCA house band and included Nilsson's version of "Cheek to Cheek". (Note: Kibbee was listed as a third co-writer on Nilsson's version.) The pair also collaborated on the soundtrack for Robert Altman's film Popeye (1980), where Parks appeared onscreen as a pianist. The film's soundtrack elicited a mostly unfavorable critical response; Parks later suggested that Tom Pierson's incidental score had overshadowed the sparse, character-driven songs, disrupting his aim at a subdued musical atmosphere inspired by the original Popeye cartoons. Elements of Parks' Popeye arrangements were later sampled in Jon Brion's score for Punch-Drunk Love (2002). Later in 1980, Parks joined Nilsson as part of a studio band for Ringo Starr's unreleased album Can't Fight Lightning, but the sessions halted abruptly following John Lennon's murder that December.

In the 1980s, Parks shifted focus to composing for television and low-budget films. In a 2011 interview, he reflected: "I withdrew from the popular music field as a producer and even as an arranger and started scoring countless television shows that mean nothing and B movies with A scores, in my view. I worked hard to get my children their college and stayed insulated, basically." This included Shelley Duvall's Faerie Tale Theatre (1982–1987).

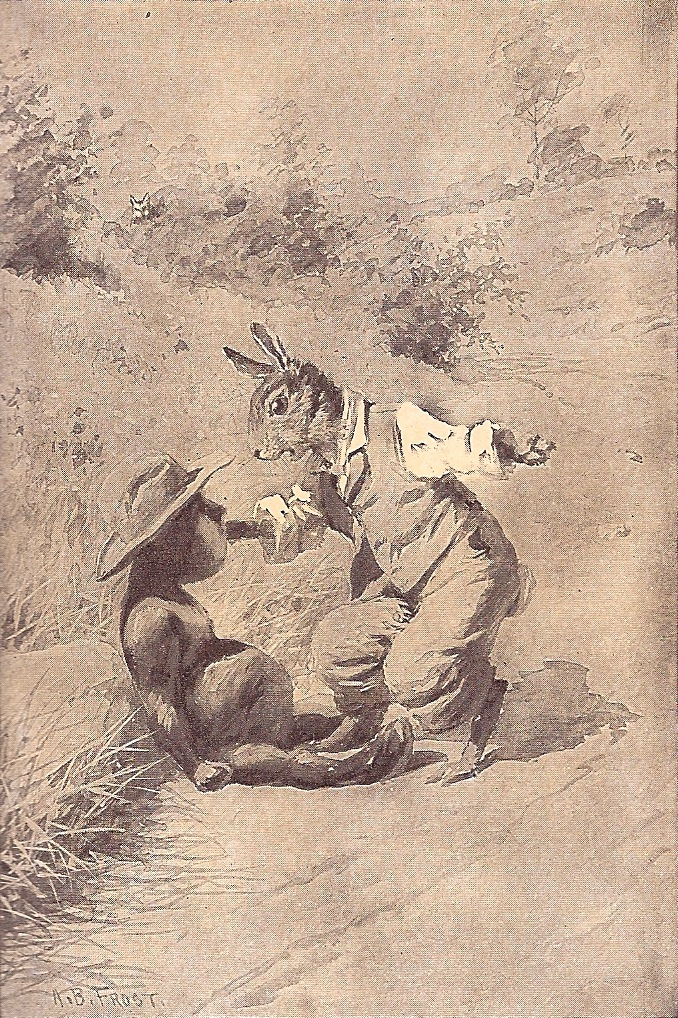
Parks adapted Br'er Rabbit folk tales for his 1984 album Jump and trilogy of children's books (illustration by A.B. Frost)

Parks revived his solo career with his fourth album, Jump! (1984), conceived as the soundtrack to a musical adaptation of Joel Chandler Harris' Uncle Remus stories. The album showcases acoustic orchestrations inspired by early 20th-century brass bands and American folk traditions. It received critical praise and Parks, collaborating with artist Barry Moser, expanded the project into a trilogy of illustrated children's books: Jump!, Jump Again!, and Jump On Over!. The first volume received a Caldecott Medal in 1986.

In 1988, Parks played accordion on the Beach Boys' single "Kokomo" and contributed four songs – "City of Light", "It's a B-Movie", "Cutting Edge", and "Worthless"—to the 1987 film The Brave Little Toaster, directed by Jerry Rees. He also co-produced Hal Wilner's multi-artist albums Lost in the Stars: The Music of Kurt Weill (1985) and Stay Awake: Various Interpretations of Music from Vintage Disney Films (1988).

Parks' fifth album Tokyo Rose (1989) continued his exploration of cross-cultural themes, revisiting Japanese-American relations initially addressed in the Song Cycle song "Pot Pourri". To promote the album, he performed concerts in Japan with Haruomi Hosono, songwriter Syd Straw, harmonicist Tommy Morgan, and steelpan player Yann Tomita as his supporting band.

In 1990, Parks appeared on Twin Peaks, playing a defense attorney in the episode "The Orchid's Curse", and in 1991 he composed the music for an album pairing Jodie Foster's narration of The Fisherman & His Wife with his original score. During this period, he also provided arrangements for U2's Rattle and Hum (1988), Sesame Street's Follow That Bird (1985), T-Bone Burnett's The Talking Animals (1988), Stan Ridgway's Mosquitos (1989), Divinyls' Divinyls (1991), and Fiona Apple's Tidal (1996).

== Later career and collaborations (1990s–present) ==
=== 1990s–2000s ===
In October 1995, Warner Bros. issued the album Orange Crate Art, credited jointly to Parks and Brian Wilson. A concept album centered on California's cultural heritage, Wilson provided lead vocals for nearly all tracks. The album received critical praise and, on October 8, 1996, Parks and Wilson performed a concert together at the Will Geer Theater in Topanga, California. In 2000, Parks was commissioned to write an overture arrangement of Wilson's songs for Wilson's Pet Sounds concert performances. Parks attended the 2001 tribute show held in Wilson's honor at the Radio City Music Hall in New York and appeared as a featured guest on his Gettin' In over My Head (2004).

I started getting excited about music again when Rufus Wainwright came up [...] Then I met more people that I could respect for their talent and who trusted me to serve them.

— Van Dyke Parks, 2011

Through the 2000s, Parks remained active as an arranger and collaborator, contributing to albums by artists such as Victoria Williams, Sam Phillips, Joanna Newsom, and Rufus Wainwright, and providing songs for the children's television series Harold and the Purple Crayon (2001–2002). Parks' association with Australian rock band Silverchair began with his work on their fourth studio album Diorama in 2002. Parks was attracted to the music of lead singer and guitarist Daniel Johns. He composed orchestral arrangements for Silverchair's fifth album Young Modern album in 2007. Johns traveled to Prague with Parks to have the arrangements recorded by the Czech Philharmonic. The album's title is a nickname Parks uses for Johns.

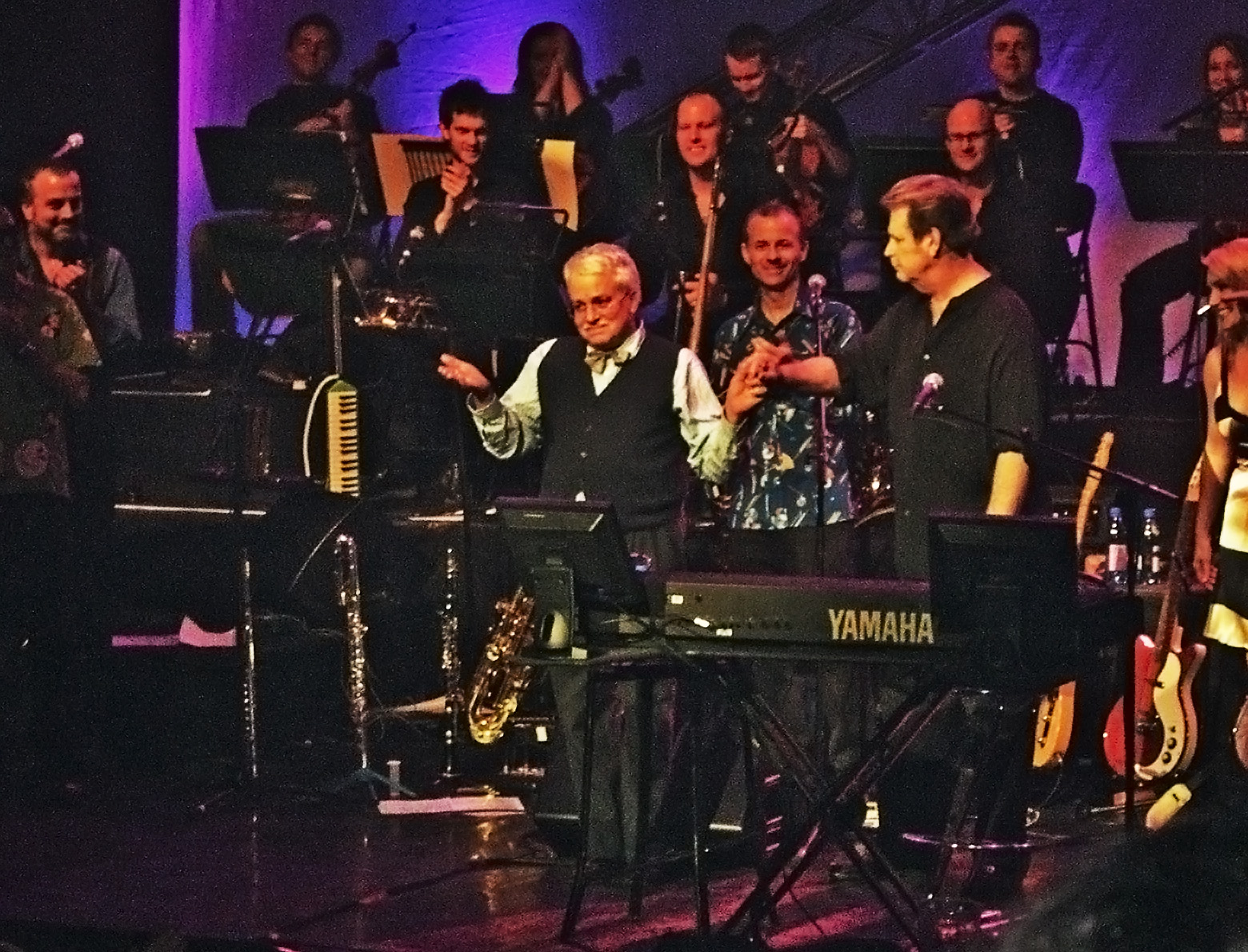
Parks onstage following Wilson's performance of Smile at the Royal Festival Hall in London, 2004

In 2003, Parks was contacted by Wilson to assist with live performances of Smile. Billed as Brian Wilson Presents Smile, Wilson embarked on a world tour of the album, beginning with a premiere performance at the Royal Festival Hall in London in 2004, which Parks attended. He subsequently provided lyrics and narration to select tracks on Wilson's That Lucky Old Sun (2008).

During this period, Parks provided arrangements for Wainwright's Want and Want Two (2004), Newsom's Ys (2006), and Scissor Sisters' Ta-Dah (2006). He contributed the Smile parody song "Black Sheep" to the 2007 comedy film Walk Hard: The Dewey Cox Story. In the late 2000s, Parks worked with Inara George, daughter of Lowell, on An Invitation (2008), an album combining Inara's vocal narratives with Parks' orchestral backdrops. They performed two songs together on January 8, 2008, at the Walt Disney Concert Hall in Los Angeles, as part of the program Concrete Frequency: Songs of the City.

In 2009, Parks performed in The People Speak, a documentary feature film that uses dramatic and musical performances of the letters, diaries, and speeches of everyday Americans, based on historian Howard Zinn's A People's History of the United States. Parks performed with Bob Dylan and Ry Cooder on the documentary broadcast on December 13, 2009, on the History Channel. They played "Do Re Mi" and reportedly a couple of other Guthrie songs that were excluded from the final edit.

=== 2010s–2020s ===
In 2011, Parks released Arrangements, Vol. 1 through his label Bananastan, a curation of previously released songs he had arranged for other artists in the 1960s. The year, he began releasing a series of vinyl singles featuring original songs, archival recordings, cover songs, and re-recordings. These tracks were compiled into the album Songs Cycled, released on May 6, 2013, through Bella Union. It was followed later in the year with Super Chief: Music for the Silver Screen, an orchestral concept album that compiled music originating from his various television and film scores over the previous decades.

In January 2013, Parks performed with Haruomi Hosono in Tokyo for the first time in many years. That March, he performed at the Adelaide Festival with Daniel Johns and Kimbra. In September, he curated a "Best-of" CD for New Orleans pianist Tom McDermott, titled Bamboula. On November 22, Parks released a 7-inch single, "I'm History", to mark the 50th anniversary of John F. Kennedy's assassination.

In 2014, Parks underwent unsuccessful hand surgery, which resulted in his hands freezing after about forty minutes of playing the piano. On May 9, 2015, he performed what he described as his "final piano performance" at the Largo nightclub in Los Angeles. Guest performers included Gaby Moreno, Joe Henry, Edward Droste of Grizzly Bear, Kimbra, and Grant Geissman.

In 2019, Parks partnered with Moreno on ¡Spangled!, creating orchestral arrangements for traditional songs from South and Central America. In the same year he also collaborated with French singer-songwriter Amélie Rousseaux (playing under the name Sofia Bolt) on her album Waves. In 2022 they again collaborated on the single All She Wants.

He arranged four compositions by Mexican poet and harpist Verónica Valerio for their 2021 EP Van Dyke Parks Orchestrates Verónica Valerio: Only in America. Additional collaborative work has included contributions as an arranger and instrumentalist for Brian Woodbury's Antipathy & Ideology (2022), Oliver Sim's Hideous Bastard (2022), Tommy McLain's I Ran Down Every Dream (2022), and Wainwright's Folkocracy (2023).

== Style and influences ==
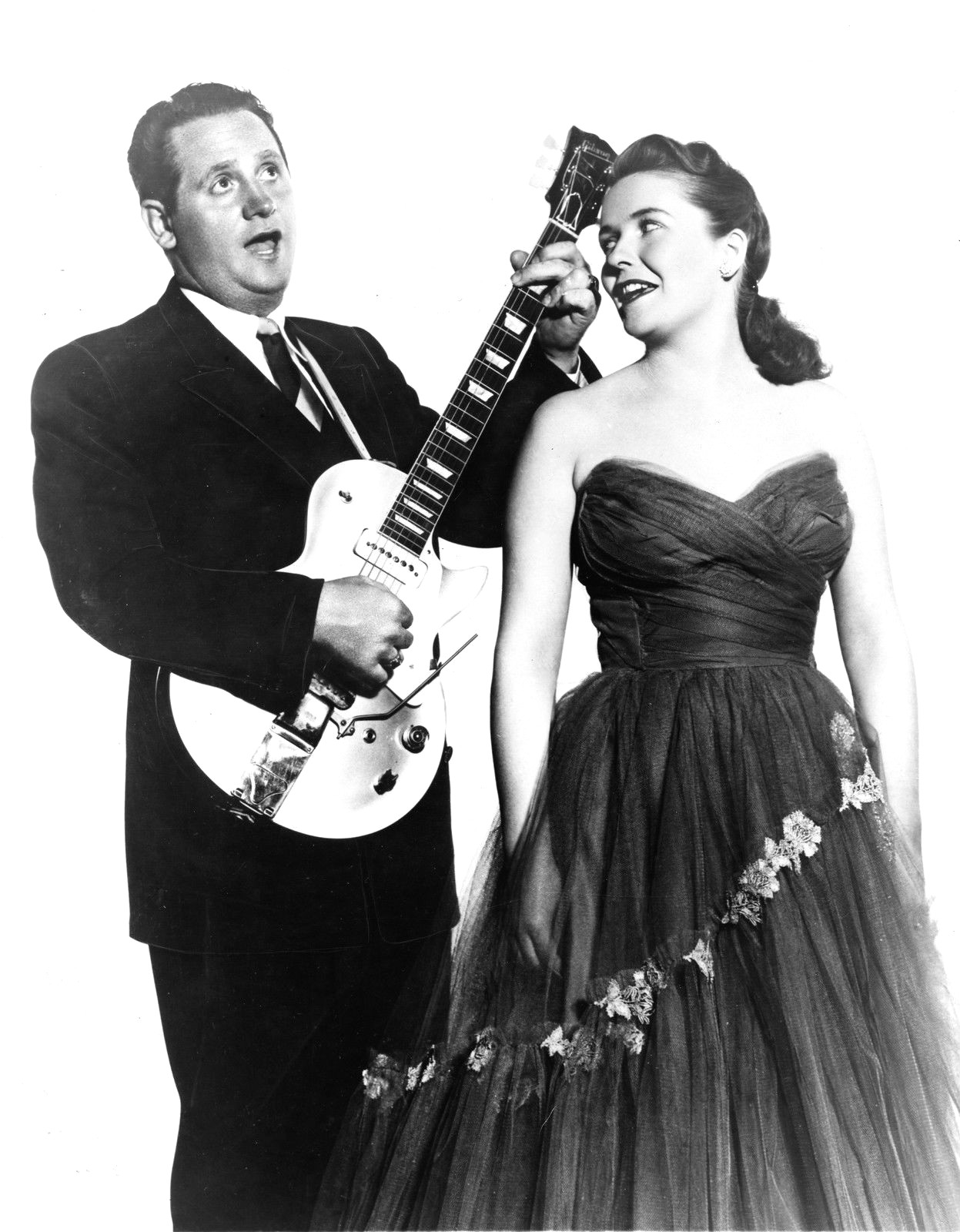
Parks acknowledged Les Paul's multi-tracked recordings with Mary Ford as a foundational influence on his production style.

Parks' overall sound and music style has been categorized as orchestral pop, Americana, art pop, baroque pop, and experimental pop. His musical influences include Percy Grainger, Louis Moreau Gottschalk, Spike Jones, Juan García Esquivel, and Les Paul, as well as Bach, Beethoven, Charles Ives, Chopin, Antonín Dvořák, Bedřich Smetana, Ralph Vaughan Williams, George Gershwin, Woody Guthrie, and Howlin' Wolf.

According to Parks, hearing Jones' "Cocktails for Two" (1944) and Les Paul and Mary Ford's "How High the Moon" (1951) as a child convinced him of the creative possibilities of recorded and multitracked sound and set him on a lifelong path in studio music. His affinity for "tuneful percussion" originated from attending Grainger's chamber-folk symphony performances in his youth.

Lyrically, Parks is characterized by a free-associative approach. Influences on his lyric style include James Joyce, Lawrence Ferlinghetti, e.e. cummings, William Saroyan, and John Steinbeck. The Discover America album title derived from Ferlinghetti's poem "I Am Waiting".

== Impact and legacy ==
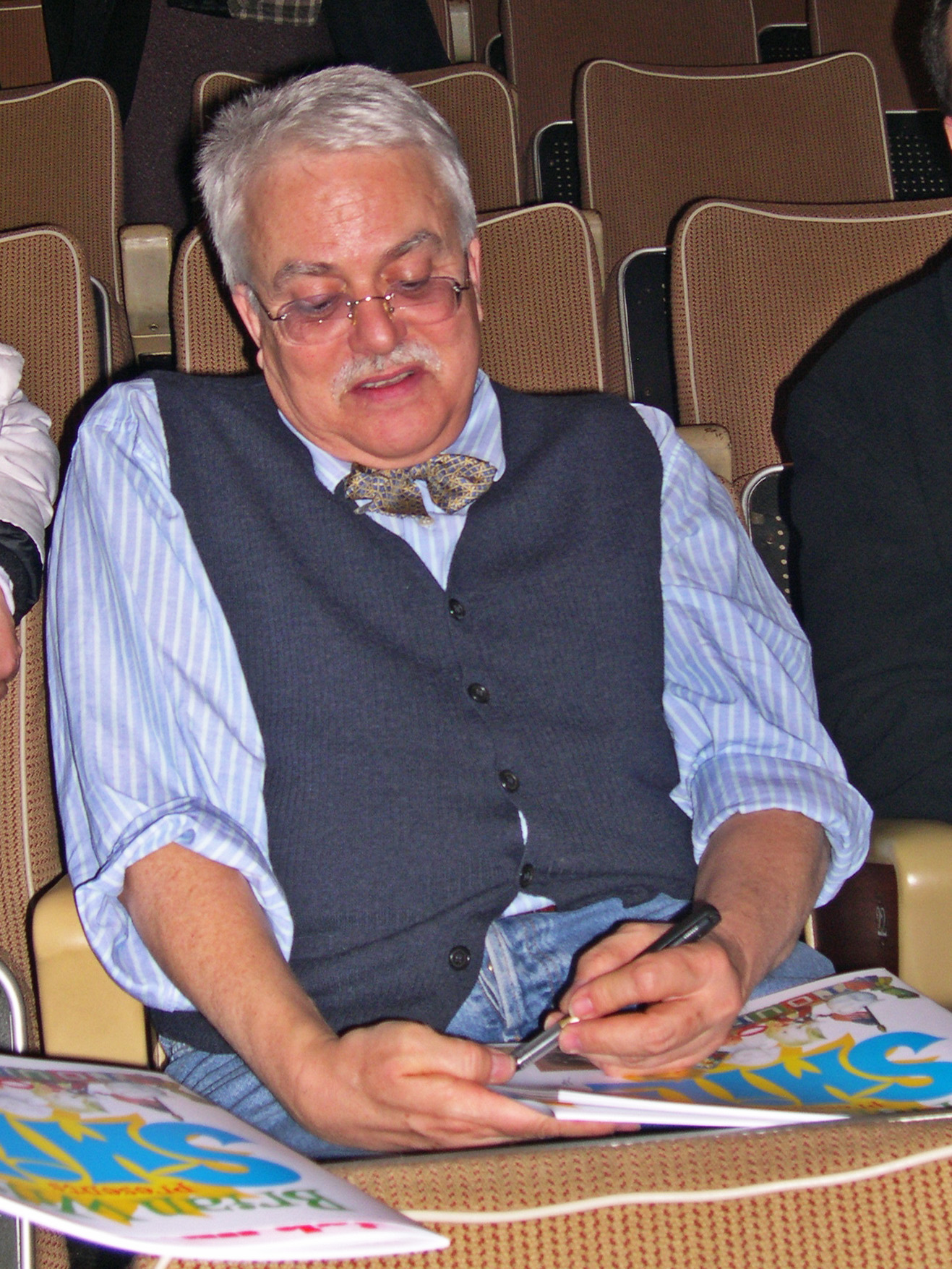
Parks signing Smile memorabilia, February 2004

In his AllMusic summary, contributor Mark Dehming wrote that Parks remains "widely regarded as one of the most talented behind-the-scenes figures in rock and pop music and a respected, cult-favorite singer/songwriter in his own right." Pitchfork contributor Jayson Greene recognized Parks as placing "an inimitable stamp on American pop, though the vast majority of music fans have no idea when they are listening to his work."

I honestly knew that I wasn't an artist, even when I signed at Warner Bros. I knew I was simply a musician who wanted to record in the studio, and I signed an artist contract basically kicking and screaming [...]

— Van Dyke Parks

Writing in 2002, Brend summarized Parks' career as eclectic and resistant to categorization, marked by his multidisciplinary approach across prolific collaborative work, involvement in 1960s and 1970s West Coast music scenes, "unique" solo projects, and ambiguously defined role at Warner Bros. Parks himself reflected on his role as a behind-the-scenes collaborator rather than a conventional solo artist, citing his work with figures such as Randy Newman, Ry Cooder, and Little Feat as examples of his preference for supporting others' creative visions.

Song Cycle influenced the 1970s singer-songwriter movement and inspired many other recording artists to experiment with studio artifice. Author and musician Bob Stanley credits Parks, among others, with originating soft rock styles leading to the offshoot genre later termed "sunshine pop", and with presaging the more complex pop styles associated with early forms of progressive rock. In his 2010-published 33⅓ book covering Song Cycle, Richard Henderson credits Parks as influential on music production in his consideration for the studio as a compositional tool alongside "the potential of a record's production to suggest scenery and location".

== Personal life ==
Parks is the great-nephew of 19th-century poet Will Carleton, whose book Farm Ballads originated the title of Parks' Clang of the Yankee Reaper. His brother Carson wrote the song "Somethin' Stupid", which became a hit for Frank and Nancy Sinatra in 1967.

== Discography ==
Studio albums

- Song Cycle (1967)
- Discover America (1972)
- Clang of the Yankee Reaper (1976)
- Jump! (1984)
- Tokyo Rose (1989)
- Orange Crate Art (1995) (with Brian Wilson)
- Songs Cycled (2013)

Live album

- Moonlighting: Live at the Ash Grove (1998)

Compilations

- Idiosyncratic Path: Best Of Van Dyke Parks (1996)
- Arrangements: Volume 1 (2011)
- Super Chief: Music For The Silver Screen (2013)

== Filmography ==
=== Film ===
Also composer

Year	Title	Role
1956	The Swan	George
1959	A Gift for Heidi	Peter
1971	Love It or Leave It	Himself / Songwriter
1980	Loose Shoes	Indian No. 2
1980	Popeye	Hoagy – the Piano Player
1985	The Beach Boys: An American Band	Himself
1987	The Brave Little Toaster	Songwriter/composer only
1988	Ry Cooder & The Moula Banda Rhythm Aces: Let's Have a Ball	Himself
1988	Vibes	Dr. Weiner
1990	The Two Jakes	Francis Hannah
1991	He Said, She Said	Priest
2007	The Old, Weird America: Harry Smith's Anthology of American Folk Music	Himself
2009	The People Speak	Himself
2010	Who Is Harry Nilsson	Himself
2010	All You Need Is Klaus	Himself
2010	Phil Ochs: There but for Fortune	Himself

=== Television ===
Year	Title	Role	Notes
1953	Bonino	Andrew Bonino	Series regular
1953	The Philco-Goodyear Television Playhouse		Episode: "The Glorification of Al Toolum"
1954	Goodyear Playhouse		Episode: "Here's Father"
1954	Ponds Theater	Elisha	Episode: "Elisha and the Long Knives"
1954	Campbell Summer Soundstage		2 episodes
1955	The Elgin Hour	Richie Dane	Episode: "Crime in the Streets"
1954–1955	Studio One in Hollywood	Lawrence Alden / Robbie / Eddie Stone	3 episodes
1955	Windows	The Boy	Episode: "The Calliope Tree"
1956	Kraft Theatre		Episode: "The Devil as a Roaring Lion"
1956	The Alcoa Hour	Ted	Episode: "Man on Fire"
1956	Star Tonight		Episode: "A Trip to Czardis"
1956	General Electric Theater	Horace	Episode: "The Golden Key"
1956–1957	The Kaiser Aluminum Hour	Boy / Bobby	2 episodes
1959	Brenner	Jay Joplin	Episode: "Family Man"
1982	Faerie Tale Theatre	The Musician	Episode: "The Tale of the Frog Prince"
1990	Twin Peaks	Jack Racine	Episode: "Episode 12"

== Bibliography ==
- Badman, Keith (2004). The Beach Boys: The Definitive Diary of America's Greatest Band, on Stage and in the Studio. Backbeat Books. ISBN 978-0-87930-818-6.
- Brend, Mark (2002). Rock and Roll Doctor: Lowell George, Guitarist, Songwriter, and Founder of Little Feat. Backbeat Books. ISBN 978-0-87930-726-4.
- Carlin, Peter Ames (2006). Catch a Wave: The Rise, Fall, and Redemption of the Beach Boys' Brian Wilson. Rodale. ISBN 978-1-59486-320-2.
- Carlin, Peter Ames (2021). Sonic Boom: The Impossible Rise of Warner Bros Records, from Hendrix to Fleetwood Mac to Madonna to Prince (First ed.). New York: Henry Holt and Company. ISBN 9781250301574.
- Carter, Dale (2021). Reading Smile: History, Myth and American Identity in Brian Wilson and Van Dyke Parks' Long-Lost Album. Abingdon, Oxon: Routledge. ISBN 9780367622862.
- Frank, Josh; Buckholtz, Charlie (2009). In Heaven Everything Is Fine: The Unsolved Life of Peter Ivers and the Lost History of New Wave Theatre. New York, NY: Soft Skull Press. p. 368. ISBN 9781593762704.
- Granata, Charles L. (2003). Wouldn't It Be Nice: Brian Wilson and the Making of the Beach Boys' Pet Sounds. A Cappella Books. ISBN 9781556525070.
- Henderson, Richard (2010). Song Cycle. 33⅓. New York: Continuum International Publishing Group. ISBN 978-0-8264-2917-9.
- Hoskyns, Barney (1996). Waiting for the Sun: Strange Days, Weird Scenes, and the Sound of Los Angeles. New York: St. Martin's Press. ISBN 978-0-312-14444-9.
- Hoskyns, Barney (2006). Hotel California: The True-Life adventures of Crosby, Stills, Nash, Young, Mitchell, Taylor, Browne, Ronstadt, Geffen, the Eagles, and Their Many Friends. John Wiley. ISBN 978-0-471-73273-0.
- Kubernik, Harvey (2009). Canyon of Dreams:The Magic and the Music of Laurel Canyon. Sterling. ISBN 978-1-4027-6589-6.
- Lake, Kirk (2010). There Will Be Rainbows: A Biography of Rufus Wainwright. HarperCollins. ISBN 978-0-06-201871-7.
- Priore, Domenic (2005). Smile: The Story of Brian Wilson's Lost Masterpiece. London: Sanctuary. ISBN 1-86074-627-6.
- Stanley, Bob (2013). Yeah Yeah Yeah: The Story of Modern Pop. Faber & Faber. ISBN 978-0-571-28198-5.
- Shipton, Alyn (2013). Nilsson: The Life of a Singer-Songwriter. Oxford University Press. ISBN 978-0-19-933069-0.
- White, Timothy (1996). The Nearest Faraway Place: Brian Wilson, the Beach Boys, and the Southern Californian Experience. Macmillan. ISBN 0333649370.
