= Tokyo Rose (album) =

Studio album by Van Dyke Parks
- Released: July 1989
- Length: 46:24
- Label: Warner Bros.
- Producer: Andrew Wickam

Van Dyke Parks chronology
Jump! (1984)	Tokyo Rose (1989)	Fisherman & His Wife (1989)

Tokyo Rose is an album by the American musician Van Dyke Parks, released in 1989. The album concerns the intersection between Japanese and American cultures and economics.

== Production ==
The album's first song, "America", is an adaptation of "America (My Country, 'Tis of Thee)" with numerous pentatonic shifts characteristic of Japanese music, played on a combination of standard Western instruments and traditional Japanese instruments, such as the biwa and the koto. Syd Straw and Danny Hutton sang on the album. "Manzanar" is about the internment of Japanese Americans.

== Critical reception ==
Professional ratings
Review scores
Source	Rating
AllMusic	3/5 stars
Chicago Sun-Times	3.5/4 stars

The Philadelphia Inquirer called the album "an ambitious suite of songs dealing with the politics, cultures and economies of a changing world." The Chicago Sun-Times deemed it "a gorgeously idiosyncratic piece of work," writing that "the string arrangements that dominate this album are every bit as beguiling as we've come to expect from Parks." The Times determined that Parks's "music ploughs its charming, obscure and highly original furrow, faintly evoking Gilbert and Sullivan or Rodgers and Hammerstein rather than any discernable acknowledgement of rock, soul or pop."

The New York Times wrote: "Sustaining a tone like the innocence and hardheadedness of E. L. Doctorow's Ragtime, Mr. Parks begins in pre-Sony times. As history and dreams flash through the orchestral arrangements, they begin a century-long prelude to an even closer future the two nations may share."

== Track listing ==
All songs written by Van Dyke Parks, except track 1, which is public domain, arranged and adapted by Parks; track 10, Japanese lyrics by Amy Furumoto.

1. "America" – 3:47
2. "Tokyo Rose" – 5:08
3. "Yankee Go Home" (features vocal of Danny Hutton) – 6:27
4. "Cowboy" – 4:35
5. "Manzanar" – 6:02
6. "Calypso" (features vocal of Mari Iijima) – 4:27
7. "White Chrysanthemum" – 4:00
8. "Trade War" – 4:40
9. "Out of Love" – 3:18
10. "One Home Run" – 4:00

== Personnel ==
- Van Dyke Parks – vocals, bass
- Todd Hayen – orchestrator, conductor
- Osamu Kitajima – biwa, koto
- Masakazu Yoshizawa – shakuhachi
- Bobby King – vocals
- Syd Straw – vocals
- Kathy Dalton – vocals
- Israel Baker – concert master
- Dennis Budimir – guitar
- Julie Christensen – vocals
- Terry Evans – vocals
- William "Bill" Greene – vocals
- Danny Hutton – vocals
- Hiromitsu Katada – narimono
- Buell Neidlinger – bass
- Akira Tana – drums
- Mike Watts – programming
- Arnold McCuller – vocals
- Mari Iijima – vocals
- Brian Otto – guitar
- Lisa Popeil – vocals

== See also ==
- Tokyo Rose
