= Esso Trinidad Steel Band =

Steel band

The Esso Trinidad Steel Band was a steel band from Trinidad, active from 1942 to 1976.

== History ==
The group began in 1942 as the Tripoli Steel Band, named after a lyric in the United States Marines' Hymn. In 1951, the group came under the leadership of Hugh Borde, who directed the ensemble to greater technical skill and established them as contenders in local Carnival competitions. In 1964, the group won the Steel Band Music Festival. The following year, the petroleum corporation Esso began sponsoring the group, who renamed themselves the Esso Trinidad Steel Band. Under Esso's sponsorship, the group grew to 28 members and was outfitted with uniforms and new instruments, and in 1967 they appeared at the Montreal Expo.

The band's performance at the Expo led to a record contract with ARC Sound, a label based in Toronto. Following this, Warner Bros. Records picked them up, and Van Dyke Parks produced a full-length album which was released in 1971. The album was nominated for a Grammy Award for Best Ethnic or Traditional Recording, but lost to Muddy Waters. Soon after the release of the album, Esso cancelled its sponsorship, so the group rechristened itself the Trinidad Tripoli Steel Band, and under this name toured internationally with Liberace. Parks recorded a one-hour documentary of the group's tour, and called them "the greatest group I've ever had the privilege to produce."

Hugh Borde and his family moved to Ypsilanti, Michigan in the United States in 1976, after which the Trinidadian group disbanded, but Borde's sons played under the name Trinidad Tripoli Steel Band in the United States, and released the albums Momentum in 1985 and Hot Like Fire in 1994.
