= Brian Wilson discography =

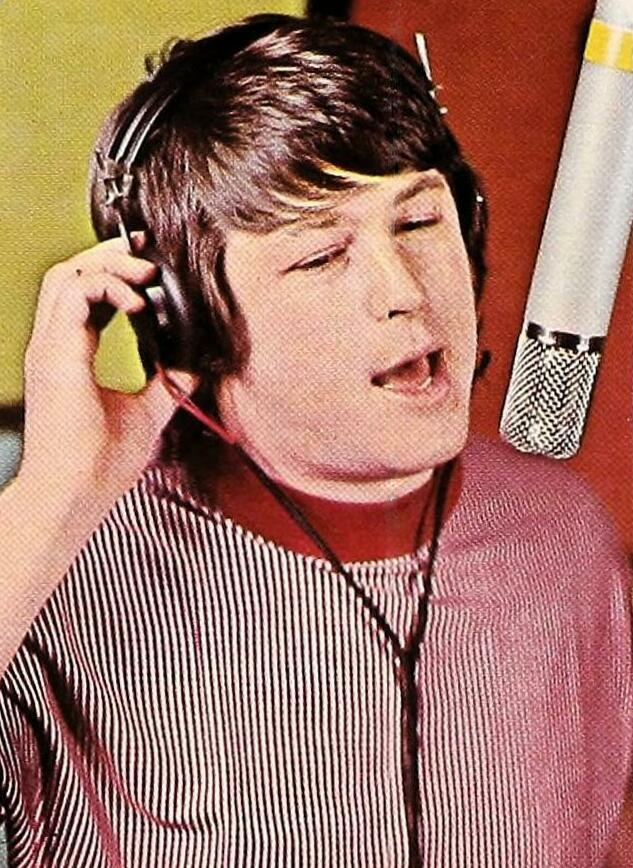
- Brian Wilson in 1966
- Studio albums: 12
- Soundtrack albums: 1
- Live albums: 3
- Compilation albums: 1
- Singles: 17

This discography lists the recordings Brian Wilson has released as a solo artist.

== Albums ==
=== Studio albums ===
List of studio albums, with selected details and peak chart positions
Title	Album details	Chart positions			
Title	Album details	US	AUS	CAN	UK
Brian Wilson	Released: July 12, 1988; Label: Sire	54	39	41	—
I Just Wasn't Made for These Times	Released: August 15, 1995; Label: MCA	—	—	—	59
Orange Crate Art (with Van Dyke Parks)	Released: October 24, 1995; Label: Warner Bros.	—	—	—	—
Imagination	Released: June 16, 1998; Label: Giant	88	—	—	30
Gettin' In Over My Head	Released: June 22, 2004; Label: Warner Bros.	100	—	—	53
Brian Wilson Presents Smile	Released: September 28, 2004; Label: Nonesuch	13	17	—	7
What I Really Want for Christmas	Released: October 18, 2005; Label: Arista	200	—	—	—
That Lucky Old Sun	Released: September 2, 2008; Label: Capitol	21	94	38	37
Brian Wilson Reimagines Gershwin	Released: August 17, 2010; Label: Walt Disney	26	95	—	55
In the Key of Disney	Released: October 25, 2011; Label: Walt Disney	83	—	—	—
No Pier Pressure	Released: April 7, 2015; Label: Capitol	28	—	—	25
At My Piano	Released: November 19, 2021; Label: Decca	—	—	—	—

=== Live albums ===
List of live albums, with selected details and peak chart positions
Title	Album details	Chart positions
Title	Album details	UK
Live at the Roxy Theatre	Released: June 2000; Label: Brimel	199
Pet Sounds Live	Released: June 11, 2002; Label: Sanctuary	107
Brian Wilson and Friends	Released: July 29, 2016; Label: BMG Rights Management / Sony BMG	—

=== Compilations ===
List of compilations, with selected details
Title	Album details
Playback: The Brian Wilson Anthology	Released: September 22, 2017; Label: Rhino

=== Soundtracks ===
List of soundtracks, with selected details
Title	Album details				
Brian Wilson: Long Promised Road (OST)	Released: November 26, 2021; Label: Lakeshore Records	—	—	—	—

== Singles ==
List of singles with selected peak chart positions
Title	Year	Label	Peak chart positions			
Title	Year	Label	US	US AC	US Rock	UK
"Caroline, No"/"Summer Means New Love"	1966	Capitol	32	—	—	—
"Gettin' Hungry"/"Devoted to You" (with Mike Love)	1967	Brother	—	—	—	—
"Let's Go to Heaven in My Car"/"Too Much Sugar"	1987	Sire	—	—	—	—
"Love and Mercy"/"He Couldn't Get His Poor Old Body to Move" (non-album track)	1988	Sire	—	—	40	—
"Melt Away"/"Being with the One You Love" (non-album track)	1989	Sire	—	—	—	—
"Do It Again"/"'Til I Die"/"This Song Wants to Sleep with You Tonight" (non-album track)	1995	MCA	—	—	—	—
"Your Imagination"/"Happy Days"	1998	Giant	— (Note: "Your Imagination" did not enter the Billboard Hot 100, but peaked at number three on the Bubbling Under Hot 100 chart.)	20	—	—
"Wonderful"/"Wind Chimes"	2004	Nonesuch	—	—	—	29
"Good Vibrations"/"In Blue Hawaii" (Instrumental)	2004	Nonesuch	—	—	—	30
"Good Vibrations"/"Our Prayer" (Live)/"Good Vibrations" (Live)	2004	Nonesuch	—	—	—	—
"Our Prayer" (Freeform Reform mix)	2004	Nonesuch	—	—	—	—
"What I Really Want for Christmas"/"We Wish You a Merry Christmas"/"Brian's Christmas Message"	2005	Sony BMG	—	29	—	66
"Deck the Halls"	2005	Sony BMG	—	8	—	—
"Midnight's Another Day"/"That Lucky Old Sun"/"Morning Beat"	2008	Capitol	—	—	—	—
"What Love Can Do"	2009	429	—	—	—	—
"They Can't Take That Away from Me"	2010	Parlophone	—	—	—	—
"God Only Knows" (with The Impossible Orchestra)	2014	BBC Music	—	—	—	20

== Other appearances ==
List of other appearances
Year	Song	Album
1987	"Let's Go to Heaven in My Car"	Police Academy 4: Citizens on Patrol
1988	"Goodnight, Irene"	Folkways: A Vision Shared
1989	"Daddy's Little Girl"	She's Out of Control
1991	"Country Feelin's"	For Our Children
1995	"Sweets for My Sweet"	Till the Night Is Gone: A Tribute to Doc Pomus
1995	"This Could Be The Night"	For the Love of Harry: Everybody Sings Nilsson
1995	"In My Moondreams" (with Andy Paley)	Pulp Surfin'
1997	"This Isn't Love"	Songs Without Words
1998	"In My Room" (with Tammy Wynette)	Tammy Wynette Remembered
2002	"California Feelin'"	Classics Selected by Brian Wilson
2004	"Rodney on the Roq"	Mayor of the Sunset Strip
2006	"The Spirit of Rock & Roll"	Songs from Here & Back
2006	"Believe in Yourself"	Carl Wilson: Under God
2007	"Live Let Live" (with Van Dyke Parks)	Arctic Tale
2007	"God Only Knows" and "What Love Can Do"	New Music from an Old Friend
2007	"Heaven"	digital download
2009	"California Sun"	Curious George 2: Follow That Monkey
2011	"Listen to Me"	Listen to Me: Buddy Holly
2014	"Wanderlust"	The Art of McCartney
2021	"Right Where I Belong" (with Jim James)	Brian Wilson: Long Promised Road

=== Live appearances ===
List of live appearances
Year	Song	Album
2005	"Across the Universe"	47th Annual Grammy Awards
2011	"Surfin' U.S.A"	The Bridge School Benefit: 25th Anniversary Edition
2016	"My Sweet Lord" (with Al Jardine)	George Fest: A Night to Celebrate the Music of George Harrison

=== Guest appearances ===
List of guest appearances
Year	Song(s)	Album
1962	"Barbie" and "What Is a Young Girl Made Of?" (with Kenny & The Cadets)	single
1963	"Surfin' Down the Swannee River" (with The Honeys)	b-side single
1963	"Surf City" (with Jan and Dean)	single
1963	"No-Go Showboat" (with The Timers)	single
1963	"Summertime" (with Sharon Marie)	b-side single
1963	"Drag City" (with Jan and Dean)	single
1963	"The One You Can't Have"(with The Honeys)	single
1964	"Little Deuce Coupe", "Drag City", "Dead Man's Curve" (with Jan and Dean)	Drag City
1964	"Pamela Jean" and "After the Game" (with The Survivors)	single
1964	"She Rides with Me"(with Paul Petersen)	single
1964	"He's a Doll" and "The Love of a Boy and a Girl" (with The Honeys)	single
1964	"Rockin' Little Roadster", "Barons, West LA", and "It's as Easy as 1, 2, 3" (with Jan and Dean)	Dead Man's Curve/The New Girl in School
1964	"Just the Way I Feel" (with Gary Usher)	b side single
1964	"Yes Sir, That's My Baby"(with Hale & The Hushabyes)	single
1964	"Ride the Wild Surf" (with Jan and Dean)	single
1964	"My Buddy Seat" (with The Hondells)	single
1965	"Guess I'm Dumb" (with Glen Campbell)	single
1966	"Things Are Changing" and "Same" (with The Blossoms)	single
1966	"Gonna Hustle You" (with Jan and Dean)	Filet Of Soul - A "Live" One
1968	"Other Four Letter Word"	Rock And Other Four Letter Words
1969	"Goodnight My Love" (with The Honeys)	b side single
1971	"All Life Is One" (with Charles Lloyd)	Warm Waters
1972	"Vegetables" (with Laughing Gravey)	single
1972	"Good Time", "Tennessee Waltz", "Sweet Mountain", "Everybody", "Thinkin' 'Bout You Baby", and "Forever" (with American Spring; “Good Time” also with The Beach Boys)	Spring
1973	"Don't You Just Know It" (with Jan Berry)	single
1975	"Help Me, Rhonda" (with Johnny Rivers)	single
1975	"Why Do Fools Fall in Love (with California Music)	single
1975	"Boat to Sail" (with Jackie DeShannon)	New Arrangement
1976	"Just 14" (with Tim Curry)	single
1976	"Jamaica Farewell" (with California Music)	single
1977	"She Did It" (with Eric Carmen)	Boats Against The Current
1978	"Almost Summer" and "Looking Good" (with Celebration)	Almost Summer
1978	"Hey Deanie" (with Eric Carmen)	Change of Heart
1979	"Surfin' Pirates" (with Pink Lady, Carl Wilson, and Mike Love)	Surfin' Pirates
1981	"Be My Baby" (with Mike Love)	Looking Back with Love
1989	"Metal Beach" (with Paul Shaffer)	Coast to Coast
1989	"Spirit of the Forest"	Spirit of the Forest
1989	"We Love You" (with Ryuichi Sakamoto)	Beauty
1989	"Adios" (with Linda Ronstadt)	Cry Like a Rainstorm, Howl Like the Wind
1992	"In a Heartbeat" (with Ringo Starr)	Time Takes Time
1996	"California" (with Belinda Carlisle)	A Woman & a Man
1996	"(When Summer Comes) Get a Chance with You" (with Jan and Dean)	All The Hits: From Surf City to Drag City
1997	"Net Surfin' U.S.A." (with Steve Dahl & The Dahlfins)	Mai-Tai Roa Aé
1997	"Monday Without You", "Miracle", "Til I Die", and "Everything I Need" (with The Wilsons)	The Wilsons
1998	"Without Understanding" (with Ringo Starr)	Vertical Man
2000	"Everything I Need" (with Jeff Foskett)	Twelve and Twelve
2002	"Hand on My Shoulder" (with Anton Fig and Blondie Chaplin)	Figments
2002	"California Girls" (with Nancy Sinatra)	California Girls
2002	"Ride" and "So Nice" (with Wondermints)	Mind If We Make Love to You
2002	"Nature Is the Law" (with Richard Ashcroft)	Human Conditions
2003	"Fooling Yourself (Palm of Your Hands)" (with Styx)	Cyclorama
2004	"In My Room" (with Wilson Phillips)	California
2004	"No Wrong Notes in Heaven" (with The Dotted Line)	The Dotted Line
2004	"Everything I Need" (with Jeff Foskett)	Stars in the Sand
2005	"Delirious Love" (with Neil Diamond)	12 Songs (special edition only)
2006	"You Are So Beautiful" (with Carnie Wilson)	A Mother's Gift: Lullabies from the Heart
2006	"Doin' the Krabby Patty"	The Best Day Ever
2007	"In My Room" (with Bill Medley)	Damn Near Righteous
2008	"Speed Turtle" (with Sandra Boynton)	Blue Moo
2008	"A World of Peace Must Come (Intro)", "The Magic Hand", "Lonely Man", and "Be Still" (with Steve Kalinich)	A World of Peace Must Come
2010	"When Love Is Dying" (with Elton John and Leon Russell)	The Union
2010	"Drivin'", "Honkin' Down the Highway", and "Don't Fight the Sea" (with Al Jardine)	A Postcard from California
2013	"MacArthur Park" (Jimmy Webb)	Still Within the Sound of My Voice
2013	"Boomerang" (with The Paley Brothers)	The Paley Brothers: The Complete Recordings
2014	"Falling Apart" (with Emile Haynie)	We Fall
2015	"Any Emotions" (with Mini Mansions)	The Great Pretenders
2018	"Dirty Computer" (with Janelle Monáe)	Dirty Computer
2020	"Resentment" (with Kesha, Sturgill Simpson, and Wrabel)	High Road
2021	"I Won’t Stay Long" (with David Crosby)	For Free
2022	"Do It Again" (with She & Him)	Melt Away: A Tribute to Brian Wilson
2024	"Strong" (with Glen Campbell)	Duets - Ghosts on the Canvas Sessions
2025	"Mary Honey" and "Everything I Need" (with Jeff Foskett)	Something There - Remembering Jeffrey Foskett

== See also ==
- The Beach Boys discography
