= List of songs recorded by Brian Wilson =

== Released songs ==
=== Studio recordings ===
Song	Writer(s)	Release	Producer	Ref.
"Auld Lang Syne"	Traditional lyrics: Robert Burns	What I Really Want for Christmas (2005)	Brian Wilson	
"Baby Let Your Hair Grow Long"	Brian Wilson	Brian Wilson (1988)	Brian Wilson; Russ Titelman	
"Barnyard"	Brian Wilson; Van Dyke Parks	Brian Wilson Presents Smile	Brian Wilson	
"Being with the One You Love"	Brian Wilson	b-side (1989)	Brian Wilson	
"Cabin Essence"	Brian Wilson; Van Dyke Parks	Brian Wilson Presents Smile (2004)	Brian Wilson	
"Caroline, No"	Brian Wilson; Tony Asher	I Just Wasn't Made for These Times (1995)	Brian Wilson; Don Was	
"Child Is Father Of The Man"	Brian Wilson; Van Dyke Parks	Brian Wilson Presents Smile (2004)	Brian Wilson	
"Christmasey"	Brian Wilson; Jimmy Webb	What I Really Want for Christmas (2005)	Brian Wilson	
"City Blues"	Brian Wilson; Scott Bennett	Gettin' in Over My Head (2004)	Brian Wilson	
"Cry"	Brian Wilson	Imagination (1998)	Brian Wilson; Joe Thomas	
"Deck the Halls"	Traditional	What I Really Want for Christmas (2005)	Brian Wilson	
"Desert Drive"	Brian Wilson; Andy Paley	Gettin' in Over My Head (2004)	Brian Wilson	
"Do It Again"	Brian Wilson; Mike Love	I Just Wasn't Made for These Times (1995)	Brian Wilson; Don Was	
"Don't Let Her Know She's An Angel"	Brian Wilson	Gettin' in Over My Head (2004)	Brian Wilson	
"Dream Angel”	Brian Wilson; Joe Thomas; Jim Peterik	Imagination (1998)	Brian Wilson; Joe Thomas	
"Fairy Tale"	Brian Wilson; David Foster	Gettin' in Over My Head (2004)	Brian Wilson	
"The First Noel"	Traditional	What I Really Want for Christmas (2005)	Brian Wilson	
"A Friend Like You"	Brian Wilson; Stephen Kalinich	Gettin' in Over My Head (2004)	Brian Wilson	
"Gee"	William Davis; Morris Levy	Brian Wilson Presents Smile (2004)	Brian Wilson	
"Gettin' in Over My Head"	Brian Wilson; Andy Paley	Gettin' in Over My Head (2004)	Brian Wilson	
"God Rest Ye Merry Gentlemen"	Traditional	What I Really Want for Christmas (2005)	Brian Wilson	
"Good Vibrations"	Brian Wilson; Tony Asher; Mike Love	Brian Wilson Presents Smile (2004)	Brian Wilson	
"Goodnight, Irene"	traditional	Folkways: A Vision Shared (1988)	Brian Wilson	
"Happy Days"	Brian Wilson	Imagination (1998)	Brian Wilson; Joe Thomas	
"Hark! The Herald Angels Sing"	Charles Wesley	What I Really Want for Christmas (2005)	Brian Wilson	
"He Couldn't Get His Poor Old Body To Move"	Brian Wilson; Lindsey Buckingham	b-side (1988)	Brian Wilson; Lindsey Buckingham	
"Heroes and Villains"	Brian Wilson; Van Dyke Parks	Brian Wilson Presents Smile (2004)	Brian Wilson	
"Hold Back Time"	Van Dyke Parks	Orange Crate Art (1995)	Van Dyke Parks	
"How Could We Still Be Dancin'?"	Brian Wilson; Joe Thomas	Gettin' in Over My Head (2004)	Brian Wilson	
"I Wanna Be Around"	Johnny Mercer; Sadie Vimmerstedt	Brian Wilson Presents Smile (2004)	Brian Wilson	
"I'm In Great Shape"	Brian Wilson; Van Dyke Parks	Brian Wilson Presents Smile (2004)	Brian Wilson	
"In Blue Hawaii"	Brian Wilson; Van Dyke Parks	Brian Wilson Presents Smile (2004)	Brian Wilson	
"It Came Upon a Midnight Clear"	Richard Storrs Willis; Edmund Sears	What I Really Want for Christmas (2005)	Brian Wilson	
"Joy to the World"	Traditional lyrics: Isaac Watts	What I Really Want for Christmas (2005)	Brian Wilson	
"Keep an Eye on Summer"	Brian Wilson; Bob Norman	Imagination (1998)	Brian Wilson; Joe Thomas	
"Lay Down Burden"	Brian Wilson; Joe Thomas	Imagination (1998)	Brian Wilson; Joe Thomas	
"Let Him Run Wild"	Brian Wilson; Mike Love	Imagination (1998)	Brian Wilson; Joe Thomas	
"Let It Shine"	Brian Wilson; Jeff Lynne	Brian Wilson (1988)	Brian Wilson; Jeff Lynne	
"Let the Wind Blow"	Brian Wilson; Mike Love	I Just Wasn't Made for These Times (1995)	Brian Wilson; Don Was	
"Let's Go to Heaven in My Car"	Brian Wilson; Gary Usher	Police Academy 4: Citizens on Patrol (soundtrack) (1987)	Brian Wilson; Gary Usher	
"Little Children"	Brian Wilson	Brian Wilson (1988)	Brian Wilson; Russ Titelman	
"Little Saint Nick"	Brian Wilson; Mike Love	What I Really Want for Christmas (2005)	Brian Wilson	
"Love And Mercy"	Brian Wilson	Brian Wilson (1988)	Brian Wilson; Russ Titelman	
"Love And Mercy"	Brian Wilson	I Just Wasn't Made for These Times (1995)	Brian Wilson; Don Was	
"Lullaby"	George Gershwin	Orange Crate Art (1995)	Van Dyke Parks	
"Make a Wish"	Brian Wilson	Gettin' in Over My Head (2004)	Brian Wilson	
"The Man with All the Toys"	Brian Wilson; Mike Love	What I Really Want for Christmas (2005)	Brian Wilson	
"Meant for You"	Brian Wilson; Mike Love	I Just Wasn't Made for These Times (1995)	Brian Wilson; Don Was	
"Meet Me In My Dreams Tonight"	Brian Wilson; Andy Paley; Andy Dean	Brian Wilson (1988)	Brian Wilson; Andy Paley	
"Melt Away"	Brian Wilson	Brian Wilson (1988); I Just Wasn't Made for These Times (1995)	Brian Wilson; Russ Titelman	
"Movies Is Magic"	Van Dyke Parks	Orange Crate Art (1995)	Van Dyke Parks	
"Mrs. O'Leary's Cow"	Brian Wilson	Brian Wilson Presents Smile (2004)	Brian Wilson	
"My Hobo Heart"	Van Dyke Parks; Michael Hazelwood	Orange Crate Art (1995)	Van Dyke Parks	
"My Jeanine"	Van Dyke Parks	Orange Crate Art (1995)	Van Dyke Parks	
"Night Time"	Brian Wilson; Andy Paley	Brian Wilson (1988)	Brian Wilson; Russ Titelman	
"O Holy Night"	Adolphe Adam; Placide Cappeau; John Sullivan Dwight	What I Really Want for Christmas (2005)	Brian Wilson	
"The Old Master Painter"	Haven Gillespie/Beasley Smith	Brian Wilson Presents Smile (2004)	Brian Wilson	
"On a Holiday"	Brian Wilson; Van Dyke Parks	Brian Wilson Presents Smile (2004)	Brian Wilson	
"On Christmas Day"	Brian Wilson	What I Really Want for Christmas (2005)	Brian Wilson	
"One For The Boys"	Brian Wilson	Brian Wilson (1988)	Brian Wilson	
"Orange Crate Art"	Van Dyke Parks	Orange Crate Art (1995)	Van Dyke Parks	
"Our Prayer"	Brian Wilson; Van Dyke Parks	Brian Wilson Presents Smile (2004)	Brian Wilson	
"Palm Tree and Moon"	Van Dyke Parks	Orange Crate Art (1995)	Van Dyke Parks	
"Rainbow Eyes"	Brian Wilson	Gettin' in Over My Head (2004)	Brian Wilson	
"Rio Grande"	Brian Wilson; Andy Paley	Brian Wilson (1988)	Brian Wilson; Lenny Waronker; Andy Paley	
"Roll Plymouth Rock"	Brian Wilson; Van Dyke Parks	Brian Wilson Presents Smile (2004)	Brian Wilson	
"Sail Away"	Van Dyke Parks	Orange Crate Art (1995)	Van Dyke Parks	
"San Francisco"	Van Dyke Parks	Orange Crate Art (1995)	Van Dyke Parks	
"Saturday Morning In The City"	Brian Wilson; Andy Paley	Gettin' in Over My Head (2004)	Brian Wilson	
"She Says That She Needs Me"	Brian Wilson; Russ Titelman; Carole Bayer Sager	Imagination (1998)	Brian Wilson; Joe Thomas	
"Silent Night"	Franz Xaver Gruber; Joseph Mohr; John Freeman Young	What I Really Want for Christmas (2005)	Brian Wilson	
"Song For Children"	Brian Wilson; Van Dyke Parks	Brian Wilson Presents Smile (2004)	Brian Wilson	
"Soul Searchin'"	Brian Wilson; Andy Paley	Gettin' in Over My Head (2004)	Brian Wilson	
"South American"	Brian Wilson; Joe Thomas; Jimmy Buffett	Imagination (1998)	Brian Wilson; Joe Thomas	
"The Spirit of Rock & Roll"	Brian Wilson; Gary Usher; Tom Kelly	Songs from Here & Back (2006)	Brian Wilson	
"Still I Dream of It"	Brian Wilson	I Just Wasn't Made for These Times (1995)	Brian Wilson; Don Was	
"Summer In Monterey"	Van Dyke Parks; Michael Hazelwood	Orange Crate Art (1995)	Van Dyke Parks	
"Sunshine"	Brian Wilson; Joe Thomas	Imagination (1998)	Brian Wilson; Joe Thomas	
"Surf's Up"	Brian Wilson; Van Dyke Parks	Brian Wilson Presents Smile (2004)	Brian Wilson	
"Sweets for My Sweet"	Doc Pomus; Mort Shuman	Till the Night Is Gone (1995)	Brian Wilson	
"There's So Many"	Brian Wilson	Brian Wilson (1988)	Brian Wilson; Russ Titelman	
"This Could Be the Night"	Harry Nilsson; Phil Spector	For the Love of Harry: Everybody Sings Nilsson (1995)	Brian Wilson	
"This Song Wants To Sleep with You Tonight"	Brian Wilson; Andy Paley	b-side (1995)	Brian Wilson; Andy Paley	
"This Town Goes Down At Sunset"	Michael Hazelwood	Orange Crate Art (1995)	Van Dyke Parks	
"This Whole World"	Brian Wilson	I Just Wasn't Made for These Times (1995)	Brian Wilson; Don Was	
"'Til I Die"	Brian Wilson	I Just Wasn't Made for These Times (1995)	Brian Wilson; Don Was	
"Too Much Sugar"	Brian Wilson	b-side (1987)	Brian Wilson	
"Vega-Tables"	Brian Wilson; Van Dyke Parks	Brian Wilson Presents Smile (2004)	Brian Wilson	
"Walkin' The Line"	Brian Wilson; Nick Laird-Clowes	Brian Wilson (1988)	Brian Wilson	
"The Waltz"	Brian Wilson; Van Dyke Parks	Gettin' in Over My Head (2004)	Brian Wilson	
"The Warmth of the Sun"	Brian Wilson; Mike Love	I Just Wasn't Made for These Times (1995)	Brian Wilson; Don Was	
"We Wish You A Merry Christmas"	Traditional	What I Really Want for Christmas (2005)	Brian Wilson	
"What I Really Want for Christmas"	Brian Wilson; Bernie Taupin	What I Really Want for Christmas (2005)	Brian Wilson	
"Where Has Love Been?"	Brian Wilson; Andy Paley; JD Souther	Imagination (1998)	Brian Wilson; Joe Thomas	
"Wind Chimes"	Brian Wilson; Van Dyke Parks	Brian Wilson Presents Smile (2004)	Brian Wilson	
"Wings Of A Dove"	Van Dyke Parks	Orange Crate Art (1995)	Van Dyke Parks	
"Wonderful"	Brian Wilson; Van Dyke Parks	I Just Wasn't Made for These Times (1995)	Brian Wilson; Don Was	
"Wonderful"	Brian Wilson; Van Dyke Parks	Brian Wilson Presents Smile (2004)	Brian Wilson	
"Workshop"	Brian Wilson	Brian Wilson Presents Smile (2004)	Brian Wilson	
"What Love Can Do"	Brian Wilson; Burt Bacharach	What Love Can Do (2009)	Phil Ramone	
"You Are My Sunshine"	Jimmie Davis	Brian Wilson Presents Smile (2004)	Brian Wilson	
"Your Imagination"	Brian Wilson; Joe Thomas; Steve Dahl	Imagination (1998)	Brian Wilson; Joe Thomas	
"You've Touched Me"	Brian Wilson; Stephen Kalinich	Gettin' in Over My Head (2004)	Brian Wilson	
"What a Wonderful World"	Bob Thiele; George David Weiss	Orange Crate Art reissue (2020)	Brian Wilson	
"Some Sweet Day"	Brian Wilson; Andy Paley	Playback: The Brian Wilson Anthology (2017)	Brian Wilson	
"Run James Run"	Brian Wilson; Joe Thomas	Playback: The Brian Wilson Anthology (2017)	Brian Wilson	
"Right Where I Belong"	Brian Wilson; Jim James	Brian Wilson: Long Promised Road (2021)	Brian Wilson	
"I'm Going Home"	Brian Wilson; Andy Paley	Brian Wilson: Long Promised Road (2021)	Brian Wilson	
"It's Not Easy Being Me"	Brian Wilson; Andy Paley	Brian Wilson: Long Promised Road (2021)	Brian Wilson	
"Must Be a Miracle"	Brian Wilson; Andy Paley	Brian Wilson: Long Promised Road (2021)	Brian Wilson	
"Slightly American Music"	Brian Wilson; Andy Paley	Brian Wilson: Long Promised Road (2021)	Brian Wilson	
"It's O.K."	Brian Wilson; Mike Love	Brian Wilson: Long Promised Road (2021)	Brian Wilson	
"Rock & Roll Has Got a Hold On Me"	Brian Wilson	Brian Wilson: Long Promised Road (2021)	Brian Wilson	
"The Night Was So Young"	Brian Wilson	Brian Wilson: Long Promised Road (2021)	Brian Wilson	
" Honeycomb"	Bob Merrill	Brian Wilson: Long Promised Road (2021)	Brian Wilson	
"Long Promised Road"	Carl Wilson; Jack Rieley	Brian Wilson: Long Promised Road (2021)	Brian Wilson	
"I'm Broke"	Brian Wilson; Andy Paley	Brian Wilson: Long Promised Road (2021)	Brian Wilson	

=== Live recordings ===
Song	Writer(s)	Album	Producer	Ref.
"Across the Universe"	John Lennon; Paul McCartney	47th Annual Grammy Awards (2005)		
"Add Some Music to Your Day"	Brian Wilson; Mike Love; Joe Knott	(2001)	Brian Wilson	
"All Summer Long"	Brian Wilson; Mike Love	Live at the Roxy Theatre (2001)	Brian Wilson	
"Back Home"	Brian Wilson	Live at the Roxy Theatre (2001)	Brian Wilson	
"Barbara Ann"	Fred Fassert	Live at the Roxy Theatre (2001)	Brian Wilson	
"Be My Baby"	Ellie Greenwich; Phil Spector; Jeff Barry	Live at the Roxy Theatre (2001)	Brian Wilson	
"Brian Wilson"	Steven Page	Live at the Roxy Theatre (2001)	Brian Wilson	
"California Girls"	Brian Wilson; Mike Love	Live at the Roxy Theatre (2001)	Brian Wilson	
"Caroline, No"	Brian Wilson; Tony Asher	Live at the Roxy Theatre (2001)	Brian Wilson	
		Pet Sounds Live (2002)	Brian Wilson	
"Darlin'"	Brian Wilson; Mike Love	Live at the Roxy Theatre (2001)	Brian Wilson	
"Do It Again"	Brian Wilson; Mike Love	Live at the Roxy Theatre (2001)	Brian Wilson	
"Don't Talk (Put Your Head on My Shoulder)"	Brian Wilson; Tony Asher	Pet Sounds Live (2002)	Brian Wilson	
"Don't Worry Baby"	Brian Wilson; Roger Christian	Live at the Roxy Theatre (2001)	Brian Wilson	
"The First Time"	Brian Wilson	Live at the Roxy Theatre (2001)	Brian Wilson	
"God Only Knows"	Brian Wilson; Tony Asher	Live at the Roxy Theatre (2001)	Brian Wilson	
		Pet Sounds Live (2002)	Brian Wilson	
"Good Vibrations"	Brian Wilson; Mike Love	Live at the Roxy Theatre (2001)	Brian Wilson	
"Here Today"	Brian Wilson; Tony Asher	Live at the Roxy Theatre (2001)	Brian Wilson	
"I Get Around"	Brian Wilson; Mike Love	Live at the Roxy Theatre (2001)	Brian Wilson	
"I Just Wasn't Made for These Times"	Brian Wilson; Tony Asher	Pet Sounds Live (2002)	Brian Wilson	
"I Know There's an Answer"	Brian Wilson; Terry Sachen; Mike Love	Pet Sounds Live (2002)	Brian Wilson	
"I'm Waiting for the Day"	Brian Wilson; Mike Love	Pet Sounds Live (2002)	Brian Wilson	
"In My Room"	Brian Wilson; Gary Usher	Live at the Roxy Theatre (2001)	Brian Wilson	
"Kiss Me, Baby"	Brian Wilson; Mike Love	Live at the Roxy Theatre (2001)	Brian Wilson	
"Lay Down Burden"	Brian Wilson; Joe Thomas	Live at the Roxy Theatre (2001)	Brian Wilson	
"Let's Go Away For Awhile"	Brian Wilson	Live at the Roxy Theatre (2001)	Brian Wilson	
		Pet Sounds Live (2002)	Brian Wilson	
"The Little Girl I Once Knew"	Brian Wilson	Live at the Roxy Theatre (2001)	Brian Wilson	
"Love And Mercy"	Brian Wilson	Live at the Roxy Theatre (2001)	Brian Wilson	
"Pet Sounds"	Brian Wilson	Live at the Roxy Theatre (2001)	Brian Wilson	
		Pet Sounds Live (2002)	Brian Wilson	
"Please Let Me Wonder"	Brian Wilson; Mike Love	Live at the Roxy Theatre (2001)	Brian Wilson	
"Sloop John B"	Traditional	Live at the Roxy Theatre (2001)	Brian Wilson	
		Pet Sounds Live (2002)	Brian Wilson	
"Surfer Girl"	Brian Wilson	Live at the Roxy Theatre (2001)	Brian Wilson	
"That's Not Me"	Brian Wilson; Tony Asher	Pet Sounds Live (2002)	Brian Wilson	
"This Isn't Love"	Brian Wilson; Tony Asher	Live at the Roxy Theatre (2001)	Brian Wilson	
"This Whole World"	Brian Wilson	Live at the Roxy Theatre (2001)	Brian Wilson	
"'Til I Die"	Brian Wilson	Live at the Roxy Theatre (2001)	Brian Wilson	
"Wouldn't It Be Nice"	Brian Wilson; Tony Asher; Mike Love	Pet Sounds Live (2002)	Brian Wilson	
"You Still Believe in Me"	Brian Wilson; Tony Asher	Pet Sounds Live (2002)	Brian Wilson	
