= I Still Do (disambiguation) =

I Still Do is a 2016 album by Eric Clapton.

I Still Do may also refer to:

- "I Still Do" (song), a 1984 song by Bill Medley
- "I Still Do", a song by The Cranberries from Everybody Else Is Doing It, So Why Can't We?
- "I Still Do", a song by I Am Kloot from Sky at Night
- "I Still Do", a song by Maggie Rogers from Don't Forget Me
- "I Still Do", a song by Paul Brandt from This Time Around
- "I Still Do", a song by Reckless Kelly from Millican
- "I Still Do", a song by Wade Hayes from On a Good Night
- I Still Do: Loving and Living with Alzheimer’s, a book by Judith Fox
