= Midnight's Another Day =

Song by Brian Wilson

from the album That Lucky Old Sun
- Released: September 2, 2008
- Length: 3:57
- Label: Capitol
- Songwriter(s): Brian Wilson/Scott Bennett
- Producer(s): Brian Wilson

"Midnight's Another Day" is a song written by Brian Wilson and Scott Bennett and is the 14th track of Wilson's 2008 album That Lucky Old Sun. An early version of the song was first released through Wilson's website in August 2007 before it was performed live a month later. Bennett considered the song to be "the most important song on the record" as it is about the time "when [Wilson] just dropped off the planet." Wilson stated that the song "describes how I feel around people... shy".

"Midnight's Another Day" received critical acclaim from critics, who praised its melody and introspective balladry, with some considering it the best track on That Lucky Old Sun.

== Composition ==
Brian Wilson collaborated with Scott Bennett in the writing of "Midnight's Another Day". Wilson's original melody for the song was at a faster tempo than the release version, with Bennett suggesting early on to "cut the tempo in half". In the making of the song, Bennett was informed by Wilson's insistence that the album That Lucky Old Sun be a different work from Smile, and thus encouraged him to have it be "confessional", stating that "if it's semiautobiographical [sic] we have to address the fact that Brian had kind of slipped off the deep end." Bennett had a positive experience working with Wilson on "Midnight's Another Day" and described it as "collaborative heaven", borrowing the words of Wilson's other songwriting partner Van Dyke Parks.

According to Bennett, the lyrics to "Midnight's Another Day" is about the time "when [Wilson] just dropped off the planet", with led Bennett to consider it as "the most important song on the record". Wilson, in answer to a question regarding which song from the album is closest to him, stated that "I really like [']Midnight’s Another Day['] because it describes how I feel around people... shy."

== Critical response ==
"Midnight's Another Day" received critical acclaim from critics. Michael Roffman, editor of Consequence of Sound, wrote that it is "possibly the album's strongest track... It's bluesy without being too bluesy, and finishes out to be a magnificent piano ballad." Michael Keefe of PopMatters praised the song for being "an aching ballad that echoes 'In My Room' and, though not as bleak, ''Til I Die'." Nic Oliver of musicOMH cited the song as one of the moments where the album reaches "sublime beauty", describing it as "a downbeat piano ballad with a killer melody line". For Keith Phipps of The A.V. Club, he considered the song to be one of the successful tracks from an ambitious but uneven album, writing that "For every lovely bit of dreaminess like 'Midnight's Another Day,' there's a skippable chugger like 'Goin' Home'". Kingsley Abbott of Record Collector stated that the song is "the high point [of That Lucky Old Sun], with vocals from Brian’s superb band rivalling the best of The Beach Boys".

The introspective lyrics to "Midnight's Another Day" were highlighted by some critics. Jon Pareles of The New York Times wrote that it is "a spacious, swaying ballad about chronic depression", with Wilson "climb[ing] toward a choral revelation, 'All these people make me feel so alone.'" Joe Tangari of Pitchfork noted that both "Midnight's Another Day" and "Oxygen to the Brain" are "direct attempts to put Wilson's past mental and substance troubles to bed." Devin King of The Boston Phoenix concluded that the album's music "is vintage Wilson... but damned if the introspective piano ballad 'Midnight’s Another Day' isn’t a hell of a swan song."
