= A Tribute to Pet Sounds =

The Reverberation Appreciation Society Presents: A Tribute to Pet Sounds

Compilation album by various artists
- Released: May 27, 2016
- Label: The Reverberation Appreciation Society
- Compiler: Al Lover for The Reverberation Appreciation Society

A Tribute to Pet Sounds is a tribute album compiled by Al Lover for the Reverberation Appreciation Society and released on May 27, 2016. Its subject is the Beach Boys' 1966 album Pet Sounds, consisting of various artists' cover versions of the album's tracks. The tribute was created to celebrate Brian Wilson's 50th anniversary performance of Pet Sounds at the Levitation festival in Austin, Texas.

The album was scheduled to be released exclusively as a double-vinyl LP at the festival before it was cancelled.

== Reception ==
Professional ratings
Review scores
Source	Rating
AllMusic	2.5/5 stars
PopMatters	5/10 stars

Stereogum's Michelle Laggan wrote that the album "strikes a unique balance in the degree to which it strays from the original ... the tribute mostly contains subtle modifications that find a happy middle ground between innovation and mimicry. With this, the album serves its ostensible purpose"

Popmatters' Jasper Bruce highlighted "That's Not Me" and "Here Today" as standout tracks, "effectively juggling vocal harmony, experimentation and positive energy to pull off ingenious takes of two of the Beach Boys’ classics. ... It’s a shame that these tracks have to be rated alongside some of the others. ... Predictably, many of the performers become too caught up in speaking to the experimental character of the Beach Boys and end up neglecting the energy of the music, the passionate tales of love and the group’s partiality for vocal harmonies."

AllMusic's Mark Deming praised "That's Not Me", "Here Today", and "Pet Sounds", but wrote: "more often, A Tribute to Pet Sounds sounds like the work of bands who may love the Beach Boys' original, but have no idea how to reconcile its magic with their own buzzy, narcotic outlook. ... Usually, even a mediocre tribute album will encourage new listeners to explore the original recordings, but the magic of Pet Sounds is so thoroughly absent here that it's hard to imagine who would turn to Brian Wilson's work by using this as a road map."

== Track listing ==
No.	Title	Writer(s)	Artist(s)	Length
1.	"Good Vibrations"	Brian Wilson/Mike Love	The Black Angels
2.	"Wouldn't It Be Nice"	Wilson/Tony Asher/Love	Indian Jewelry
3.	"You Still Believe in Me"	Wilson/Asher	The She’s
4.	"That's Not Me"	Wilson/Asher	Holy Wave
5.	"Don't Talk (Put Your Head on My Shoulder)"	Wilson/Asher	Morgan Delt
6.	"I'm Waiting for the Day"	Wilson/Love	The Shivas
7.	"Let's Go Away for Awhile"	Wilson	Boogarins
8.	"Sloop John B"	traditional, arranged by Wilson	Night Beats
9.	"God Only Knows"	Wilson/Asher	Chris Catalena
10.	"I Know There's an Answer"	Wilson/Terry Sachen/Love	Christian Bland & the Revelators
11.	"Here Today"	Wilson/Asher	Cool Ghouls
12.	"I Just Wasn't Made for These Times"	Wilson/Asher	Shannon & the Clams
13.	"Pet Sounds"	Wilson	Burnt Ones
14.	"Caroline, No"	Wilson/Asher	Cosmonauts
15.	"Hang On to Your Ego"	Wilson/Love/Terry Sachen	The UFO Club

== See also ==
- List of cover versions of Beach Boys songs
