= Here Today (The Beach Boys song) =

1966 song by the Beach Boys

- B-side of 1967 "Darlin'" single release

Song by the Beach Boys

from the album Pet Sounds
- Released: May 16, 1966
- Recorded: March 1966
- Studio: Sunset Sound and Columbia, Hollywood
- Genre: Chamber pop
- Length: 3:07
- Label: Capitol
- Songwriters: Brian Wilson; Tony Asher
- Producer: Brian Wilson

The Beach Boys singles chronology
"Wild Honey" (1967)	"Darlin'" / "Here Today" (1967)	"Friends" (1968)

Licensed audio
- "Here Today" on YouTube

Audio sample
- file; help

"Here Today" is a song by the American rock band the Beach Boys from their 1966 album Pet Sounds. Written by Brian Wilson and Tony Asher, the lyric warns the listener of inevitable heartbreak before the narrator reveals himself to be the ex-boyfriend of the listener's newfound love. Musically, the song features an uncommon formal structure, the use of electric bass guitar as a lead instrument, and a 20-bar length instrumental break.

One of the last songs recorded for Pet Sounds, Wilson produced the track in March 1966 with the aid of his bandmates, who provided additional backing vocals, and 12 studio musicians, who played guitars, organ, upright bass, trombones, saxophones, tack piano, drums, and other percussion. Mike Love sang the lead vocal.

"Here Today" proved influential to musicians such as Al Kooper, Paul McCartney, and Lemmy. Acts who have covered the song include Bobby Vee, R. Stevie Moore, Mathilde Santing, and Thurston Moore.

== Background and lyrics ==
"Here Today" was written by Brian Wilson and Tony Asher for the Beach Boys' Pet Sounds album in early 1966. Although Wilson claimed that Asher only provided the words to his music, Asher credited himself with contributing musical ideas to several songs on the album, including this one, as Asher stated, "'Here Today' contains a little more of me both lyrically and melodically than Brian." Moreover, Asher said,

That's a song that has a number of little sections to it that are quite different. It was not one of the easier songs to write on the album. It was, as I recall, a song that I wrote quite a lot to, much of which we didn't use. It was sort of a struggle before we got a lyric that Brian was happy with.

The lyrics warn the listener to beware of his newfound love and prepare for the potential heartbreak that may result ("A brand new love affair is such a beautiful thing / but if you're not careful think about the pain it can bring"). In his view, relationships are short-lasting ("Love is here today and it's gone tomorrow / it's here and gone so fast"). The narrator also warns that the aforementioned lover will make the listener "feel so bad", his "heart feel sad", his "days go wrong", and his "nights so long". To prove his case, the narrator reveals himself to be her ex-boyfriend ("Well you know I hate to be a downer / but I'm the guy she left before you found her").

Wilson stated in 1996 that the song had "really good lyrics", but in another interview from the same year, he said, "'Here Today' was probably one of the mystery songs on the album. I don't really know what it's about. I liked it, but yet I didn't. I don't really identify with that song like I do with 'You Still Believe In Me', or 'Caroline, No.' It was just one of those songs in there, one little song."

== Composition ==
Instrumental break and chorus from "Here Today" (1996 stereo mix)
Excerpt of the instrumental break and third chorus, demonstrating the electric bass focal point of the piece.

"Here Today" is primarily in the key of A major, with other portions suggesting F♯ minor. (Note: Lambert notes that the move from A to F♯ major "recalls the exact key centers of 'That's Not Me'".) Wilson said: "'Here Today' was a work of art in my opinion. It was an assertive track with utilization of basses played up higher. The trombones gave it that masculine touch." He stated that his intention for the piece was "to conceive the idea of a bass guitar playing an octave higher than regular and showcase it as the principal instrument in the track." Dillon suggests that Wilson may have been influenced by Bill Wyman's bass-playing on "19th Nervous Breakdown", a then-current hit for the Rolling Stones.

The formal structure in this song is uncommon for "most pop music", Granata argues, "or any music for that matter." The first two verses, which are almost identical, have unusual bar structures, each being divided into three sections of eight, seven and three bars (20 in total). These uncommon numberings continue in the choruses, as Granata explains, "While it is rare for a chorus to contain an odd number of measures, all three choruses on 'Here Today' are seven bars. Most choruses are eight bars long. Occasionally a chorus will be lengthened to imply suspense or extension of time. The purposeful shortening of the choruses here emphasizes the 'here today, gone tomorrow' idea reflected in the lyric."

The arrangement includes a horn ensemble consisting of two saxophones and two trombones. Granata surmised that the saxophone voicings were influenced by Four Seasons songs such as "Opus 17 (Don't You Worry 'bout Me)". He continues in his analysis, "Throughout, the bass line accentuates the melody. The bass and horns also move in contrary motion to the vocals: in the chorus, the rhythm section and the horns play a descending line of quarter notes while the vocals ascend with 'Ah-ah.'" Dillon concurred that the contrasting motions, which often conflict with Love's vocals, "creates a slightly uneasy feeling, not unlike how one would feel in a volatile romance." Bruce Johnston praised Wilson's discretion in arranging the backing vocals: "He correctly used the vocals as another pad. If he had made the mistake of overwriting the background parts, you would never pay attention to the leads, and we would have gotten in the way."

A 20-bar instrumental break – with three sections divided into eight, six, and six bars – occurs between the second and third choruses. In this point in the song (1:47–2:02), musicologist Walter Everett notes "[o]ne of the most remarkable parts in the bass literature ... where rapidly repeated bass notes are all sevenths, 1 appearing beneath ii, in alternation with ♭7 placed below I." According to Granata, "This break presents another neat rhythmic situation. The first eight measures consist of short, accented punctuations by all of the instruments except the pulsating bass." This is directly followed by another major shift in which "all instruments (primarily piano and circus-style organ) maintain the tempo, but the feel changes when the snare pounds out a set of polka-like eighth notes."

== Recording ==
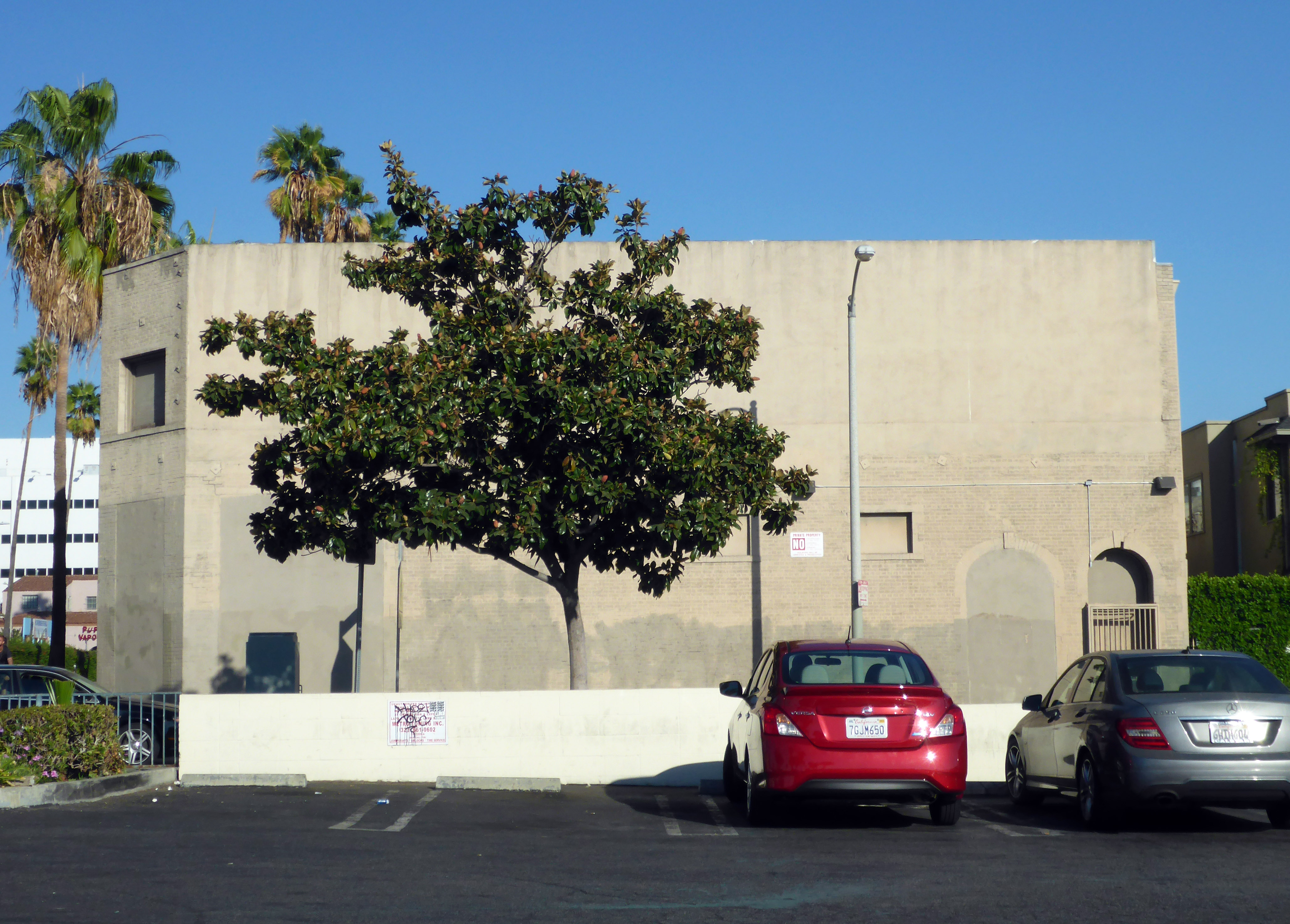
"Here Today" is the only track on Pet Sounds that was recorded at Sunset Sound Recorders in Hollywood

"Here Today" was the last song started for the Pet Sounds album. Logged as "I Don't Have a Title Yet", the instrumental track was recorded on March 10 or 11, 1966 at Sunset Sound Recorders Studio A. (Note: The tape box was labelled with March 10, while the American Federation of Musicians contract was labelled with March 11.) This marked the only occasion that Wilson recorded at Sunset Sound during the Pet Sounds sessions, having been recommended the studio by session musician Steve Douglas. The engineer for this session, Bruce Botnick, later worked on the 1967 album Forever Changes by Love.

The vocals were overdubbed two weeks later, on March 23 and 25, at Columbia Studio A. In the original mono release, some studio chatter, spoken by Bruce Johnston about a photographer's camera, can be heard during the instrumental break. Then, Wilson shouts "No talking!" at Johnston, who had been unaware that the tape was rolling. Johnston recalled this exchange as an example of how "Brian was a combination of Rachmaninoff and General Patton. He was [brilliantly] brutal in the studio." At the end of this break, Wilson says, "Top, please," which was an instruction to the engineer to rewind the tape to the beginning of the song so the group could attempt another take of the vocals.

Record producer Phil Ramone afforded attention to Wilson's mixing and production layering on Pet Sounds and this track in particular: "There are placements for every instrument in the mono mix—they're great studies of contrast, texture, balance, and rhythm. For example, on 'Here Today,' the combination of wet and dry sounds in the vocals and the distinctive sound of the organ and baritone sax give it incredible dimension."

== Release history ==
On May 16, 1966, "Here Today" was released as the tenth track on Pet Sounds, sequenced in between "I Know There's an Answer" and "I Just Wasn't Made for These Times". It later appeared on the 1966 EP God Only Knows (released exclusively in the UK). In December 1967, "Here Today" was issued again as the B-side to the 1967 single "Darlin'", a top 30 hit. Unlike earlier B-sides by the group such as "Don't Worry Baby" and "God Only Knows" it did not chart.

A promotional film for the song, directed by band publicist Derek Taylor, was filmed for the UK's Top of the Pops on April 25. The film featured the group (minus Johnston) at Lake Arrowhead, flailing around in grotesque horror masks and playing Old Maid. The clip ran for five minutes and featured excerpts from "Here Today" alongside "Wouldn't It Be Nice" and "God Only Knows". The original clip was never released due to concerns from the BBC over the horror masks. An edited version was later released, with only "God Only Knows" featured.

In 1968, the backing track of "Here Today" was issued on the Beach Boys' album Stack-o-Tracks. In 1996, to promote The Pet Sounds Sessions (1997), Sub Pop issued a newly mixed stereo backing track of "Here Today" as the B-side of the first true stereo mix of "I Just Wasn't Made for These Times". This version omitted the studio chatter present in the 1966 mono mix.

== Critical reception ==
AllMusic reviewer Donald Guarisco praised "Here Today" as "a highlight of Pet Sounds" and "one of Brian Wilson's most ambitious arrangements." Dillon similarly called it "one of the album's most incredible instrumental arrangements" and "the most direct precursor to 'Good Vibrations'".

A 1972 Rolling Stone review of Pet Sounds written by Stephen Davis characterized "Here Today" as an unusually "angry" song on the album, highlighting its depiction of "pessimism and dissatisfaction". The same review drew similarities between "Here Today" and "I Just Wasn't Made for These Times", noting that both the subject matter of each has a "universal" nature, and speaks directly to the audience. Davis surmises that these songs succeed because "Wilson knows how most people think".

Conversely, in his self-described "unbiased" review of Pet Sounds for Record Mirror, Norman Jopling described "Here Today" as perhaps the album's "corniest song" and that "one is left with the feeling that this track is a kind of condensed showcase of all the backing sounds that anyone could cram into a few minutes. Not too good at all..."

== Influence ==
Blood, Sweat & Tears founder Al Kooper, whose favorite album of all time is the 1997 box set The Pet Sounds Sessions, said that "Here Today" inspired the organ break in his band's 1969 hit "You've Made Me So Very Happy", as well as his songs "I Can Love a Woman" (1968) and "Lucille" (1969). Motörhead founder Lemmy Kilmister regarded "Here Today" as "quite innovative" and would perform the song at clubs early in his career. Musician Lenie Colacino argued that the bass part was a direct influence on Paul McCartney's bass-playing on "With a Little Help from My Friends" and "Getting Better" from Sgt. Pepper's Lonely Hearts Club Band (1967).

== Personnel ==
Per Craig Slowinski.

The Beach Boys

- Al Jardine – backing vocals
- Bruce Johnston – backing vocals
- Mike Love – lead and backing vocals
- Brian Wilson – backing vocals (falsetto); producer
- Carl Wilson – backing vocals

Session musicians (later known as "the Wrecking Crew")

- Frank Capp – tambourine on snare drum
- Al Casey – 12-string electric guitar
- Mike Deasy – 12-string acoustic guitar
- Larry Knechtel – Hammond B3 organ
- Gail Martin – bass trombone
- Nick Martinis – drums
- Jay Migliori – baritone saxophone
- Jack Nimitz – baritone saxophone
- Ray Pohlman – electric bass guitar
- Don Randi – tack piano
- Lyle Ritz – upright bass
- Ernie Tack – bass trombone

The American Federation of Musicians (AFM) contract erroneously credits Terry Melcher with having played tambourine on this track.

== Cover versions ==
- 1966 – Robb Storme Group
- 1966 – Bobby Vee
- 1967 – The Pleazers
- 1967 – The Seftons
- 1970 – Sunshine
- 1981 – R. Stevie Moore
- 1982 – Mathilde Santing, Mathilde Santing
- 1998 – Thurston Moore, Smiling Pets
- 2002 – Brian Wilson, Pet Sounds Live
- 2012 – Jodie Marie, MOJO Presents Pet Sounds Revisited
- 2013 – The One & Nines, Mint 400 Presents the Beach Boys Pet Sounds
- 2016 – Cool Ghouls, A Tribute to Pet Sounds

== Bibliography ==
- Badman, Keith (2004). The Beach Boys: The Definitive Diary of America's Greatest Band, on Stage and in the Studio. Backbeat Books. ISBN 978-0-87930-818-6.* Dillon, Mark (2012). Fifty Sides of the Beach Boys: The Songs That Tell Their Story. ECW Press. ISBN 978-1-77090-198-8.
- Everett, Walter (2008). The Foundations of Rock: From Blue Suede Shoes to Suite: Judy Blue Eyes. Oxford University Press. ISBN 978-0-19-029497-7.
- Gaines, Steven (1986). Heroes and Villains: The True Story of The Beach Boys. New York: Da Capo Press. ISBN 0306806479.
- Granata, Charles L. (2003). Wouldn't It Be Nice: Brian Wilson and the Making of the Beach Boys' Pet Sounds. A Cappella Books. ISBN 9781556525070.
- Kent, Nick (1995). "The Last Beach Movie Revisited: The Life of Brian Wilson". The Dark Stuff: Selected Writings on Rock Music. Da Capo Press. pp. 1–74. ISBN 0306806460.
- Kilmister, Lemmy (2016). White Line Fever: The Autobiography (New ed.). London: Simon & Schuster. ISBN 9781471112713.
- Lambert, Philip (2007). Inside the Music of Brian Wilson: The Songs, Sounds, and Influences of the Beach Boys' Founding Genius. Bloomsbury Publishing. ISBN 978-1-4411-0748-0.
- Lambert, Philip (March 2008). "Brian Wilson's Pet Sounds". Twentieth-Century Music. 5 (1). Cambridge University Press: 109–133. doi:10.1017/S1478572208000625. S2CID 162871617. Archived from the original on October 2, 2021.
