= That Lucky Old Sun (album) =

Studio album by Brian Wilson
- Released: September 2, 2008
- Recorded: January–April 2008
- Genre: Art pop
- Length: 38:09
- Label: Capitol
- Producer: Brian Wilson

Brian Wilson chronology
What I Really Want for Christmas (2005)	That Lucky Old Sun (2008)	Brian Wilson Reimagines Gershwin (2010)

That Lucky Old Sun is the seventh studio album by American musician Brian Wilson, released on September 2, 2008 by Capitol Records. It was written in collaboration with Wilson's bandmate Scott Bennett, with spoken word poetry commissioned from Van Dyke Parks. The work is themed around the culture of Los Angeles and uses the 1949 song "That Lucky Old Sun", written by Beasley Smith and Haven Gillespie, as its overture. It was met with generally positive reviews and peaked at number 21 in the U.S. and number 37 in the UK.

== Background ==
That Lucky Old Sun was commissioned by the Southbank Centre for its 2007 opening season. The work debuted in a series of concerts at the Royal Festival Hall in London, England during September 2007. In January 2008, it also performed at the State Theatre in Sydney, Australia for the Sydney Festival.

== Concept ==
Wilson described the piece as "consisting of five 'rounds', with interspersed spoken word". The work's main theme is celebration of life in Southern California and repeats the themes of Wilson's earlier work with the Beach Boys. "California Role" and numerous spoken interludes such as "Cinco de Mayo" and "Between Pictures" celebrate the culture of Venice Beach, the Los Angeles film industry and numerous Californian landmarks including the Capitol Tower and Hollywood Bowl. Rolling Stone called it a "musical love letter to his native Los Angeles".

== Release and reception ==
Professional ratings
Aggregate scores
Source	Rating
Metacritic	70/100
Review scores
Source	Rating
AllMusic	2.5/5 stars
Christgau's Consumer Guide	(1-star Honorable Mention)
Entertainment Weekly	B
Mojo	4/5 stars
Pitchfork	7.8/10
PopMatters	8/10 stars
Rolling Stone	4/5 stars
Slant Magazine	4.5/5 stars
Spin	8/10
Uncut	4/5 stars

Early demos of the tracks "Midnight's Another Day" and "Forever She'll Be My Surfer Girl" were released on Wilson's official website in August 2007. Live bootlegs and studio demos of the complete work also circulated on the Internet. Released in September 2008, That Lucky Old Sun entered the UK Albums Chart at number 37 and the Billboard 200 at number 21; the album had sold 65,000 copies in the U.S. by 2015. Based on 26 reviews, it has a score of 70 out of 100 on Metacritic, indicating "generally favorable reviews".

In 2009 a limited edition box set of That Lucky Old Sun was produced in England by Genesis Publications. The set was a collaboration with artist Peter Blake, and included twelve serigraphs by Blake each illustrating a song from the album as well as three facsimile sheets of music, a VIP pass and “one of the first pressings” of the That Lucky Old Sun CD.

== Track listing ==
No.	Title	Writer(s)	Length
1.	"That Lucky Old Sun"	Beasley Smith, Haven Gillespie	0:57
2.	"Morning Beat"	Brian Wilson, Scott Bennett	2:55
3.	"Room with a View" (narrative)	Wilson, Van Dyke Parks	0:45
4.	"Good Kind of Love"	Wilson	3:20
5.	"Forever She'll Be My Surfer Girl"	Wilson, Bennett	2:52
6.	"Venice Beach" (narrative)	Wilson, Parks	0:45
7.	"Live Let Live / That Lucky Old Sun" (reprise)	Wilson/Parks–Smith, Gillespie	2:35
8.	"Mexican Girl"	Wilson, Bennett	2:42
9.	"Cinco de Mayo" (narrative)	Wilson, Parks	0:46
10.	"California Role / That Lucky Old Sun" (reprise)	Wilson/Bennett–Smith, Gillespie	2:41
11.	"Between Pictures" (narrative)	Wilson, Parks	0:48
12.	"Oxygen to the Brain"	Wilson, Bennett	3:28
13.	"Can't Wait Too Long"	Wilson	0:54
14.	"Midnight's Another Day"	Wilson, Bennett	3:57
15.	"That Lucky Old Sun" (Reprise)	Smith, Gillespie	0:43
16.	"Going Home"	Wilson, Bennett	3:03
17.	"Southern California"	Wilson, Bennett	4:58
Total length:			38:09

iTunes bonus tracks
No.	Title	Writer(s)	Length
18.	"Oh Mi Amor"	Wilson	3:52
19.	"Message Man" (featuring Danny Hutton)	Wilson	3:55

Best Buy CD bonus tracks
No.	Title	Writer(s)	Length
18.	"Good Kind of Love" (featuring Carole King)	Wilson	3:20
19.	"I'm into Something Good" (featuring Carole King)	Gerry Goffin, Carole King	3:18
20.	"Just Like Me and You"	Wilson, Parks	3:49

== Personnel ==
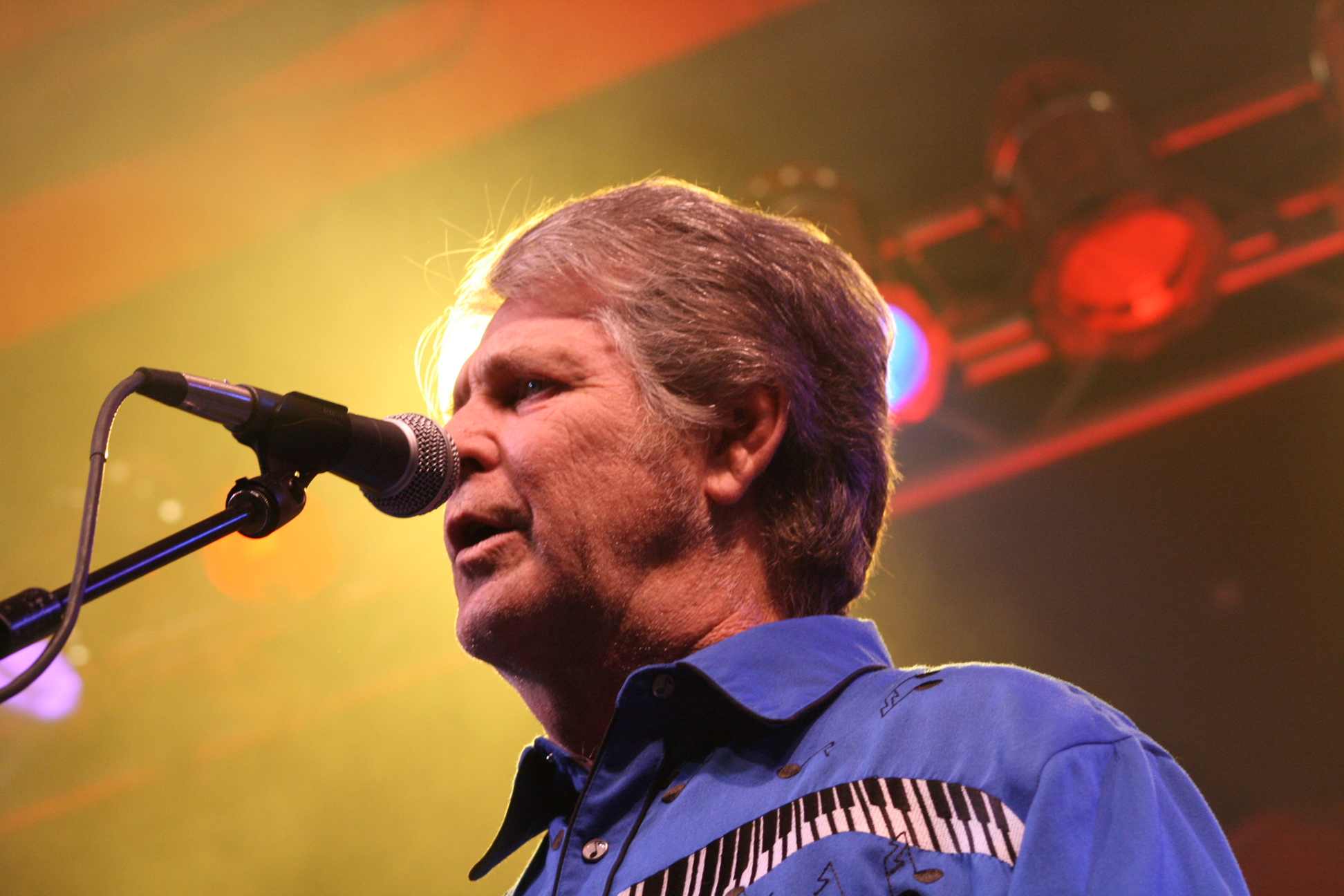
Wilson performing in 2007

From the album's liner notes.

- Brian Wilson – lead vocals, keyboards

Brian Wilson Band

- Jeffrey Foskett – backing vocals, guitar, ukulele
- Darian Sahanaja – backing vocals, keyboards, bells
- Scott Bennett – backing vocals, keyboards, vibraphone, Spanish guitar, bass on "Southern California"
- Paul Von Mertens – saxophones, clarinets, flutes
- Probyn Gregory – backing vocals, guitars, French horn, trumpet
- Nick Walusko – backing vocals, guitar
- Nelson Bragg – backing vocals, percussion
- Taylor Mills – backing vocals
- Bob Lizik – bass
- Todd Sucherman – drums

Additional musicians

- Tommy Morgan – harmonica on "Going Home"
- Brett Simons – acoustic bass on "Mexican Girl", electric bass on "Going Home"
- Peter Kent – 1st violin
- Sharon Jackson – 2nd violin
- Jessica van Velzen – viola
- Cameron Stone – cello
- Peggy Baldwin – cello
- Phil Feather – woodwinds
- Charlie Moralis – trombone
- Bruce Otto – trombone

Production staff

- Paul Von Mertens - conductor (strings and horns)
- Mark Linett - engineer

== Charts ==
Chart performance for That Lucky Old Sun
Chart (2007)	Peak position
Australian Albums (ARIA)	97
Belgian Albums (Ultratop Flanders)	41
Belgian Albums (Ultratop Wallonia)	92
Dutch Albums (Album Top 100)	54
French Albums (SNEP)	82
German Albums (Offizielle Top 100)	45
Italian Albums (FIMI)	92
Norwegian Albums (VG-lista)	15
Swedish Albums (Sverigetopplistan)	33
UK Albums (Official Charts)	37
US Billboard 200	21
