= Bill Medley =

American singer (born 1940)

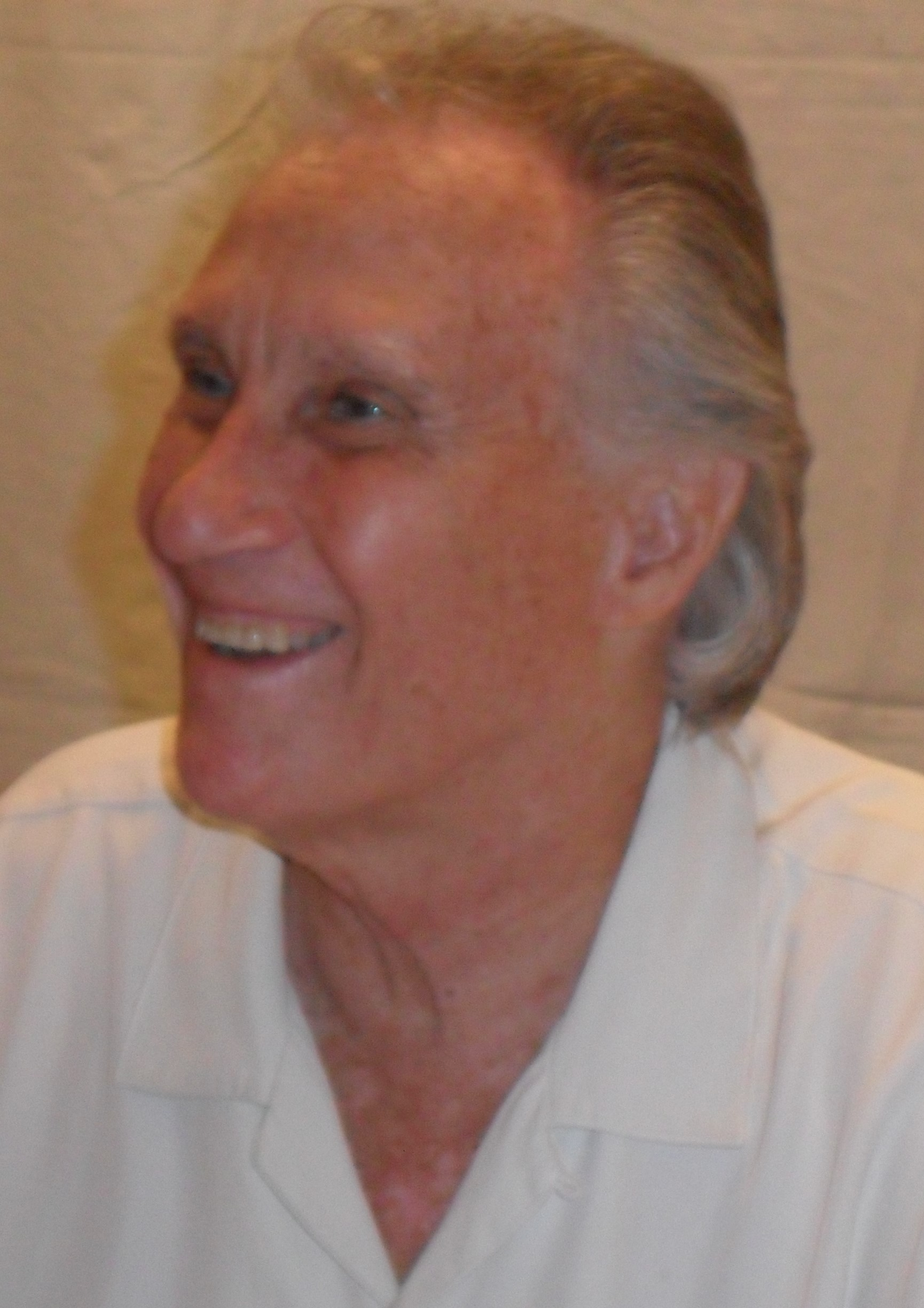
- Medley in 2012 at The Big E, West Springfield, Massachusetts

Background information
- Born: William Thomas Medley; September 19, 1940 (age 86); Santa Ana, California, U.S.
- Origin: Los Angeles, California, U.S.
- Genres: Blue-eyed soul, pop, country
- Occupations: Singer; songwriter
- Years active: 1962–present
- Labels: United Artists, RCA, Reprise, Curb
- Member of: The Righteous Brothers

William Thomas Medley (born September 19, 1940) is an American singer best known as one of the Righteous Brothers. He is noted for his bass-baritone voice, exemplified in songs such as "You've Lost That Lovin' Feelin'". Medley produced a number of the duo's songs, including "Unchained Melody" and "(You're My) Soul and Inspiration".

Medley is also a solo artist. His million-selling No. 1 duet with Jennifer Warnes, "(I've Had) The Time of My Life" (1987), won a number of awards. In the 1980s, Medley also had a string of country music chart hits.

== Early life ==
Medley was born September 19, 1940, in Santa Ana, California to Arnold and Irma Medley. He attended Santa Ana High School, graduating in 1958. Raised a Presbyterian, he sang in the church choir, and his parents had a swing band. He became interested in R&B music through listening to black-oriented radio stations. An early influence he has cited is Little Richard, whom he first heard when he was fifteen or sixteen years old, and later Ray Charles, Bobby "Blue" Bland, and B.B. King.

Medley first formed a singing duo called The Romancers with his friend Don Fiduccia, who also played the guitar. He began to write songs and record multi-track recordings in his living room. At 19, he wrote two songs recorded by vocal group The Diamonds: “Woomai-Ling”, released as a single in 1961, and “Chimes in My Heart”, unreleased until the 1996 compilation album “The Best of The Diamonds: The Mercury Years”. Medley and Fiduccia then formed a group called The Paramours in 1960, with Sal Fasulo and Nick Tuturro, later joined by Mike Rider and Barry Rillera. The band had its first paying gig at Little Italy restaurant in Anaheim, California. The Paramours were signed to Mercury Records' subsidiary label Smash Records, releasing such songs as "That's the Way We Love" and "Miss Social Climber" in 1961.

== The Righteous Brothers ==
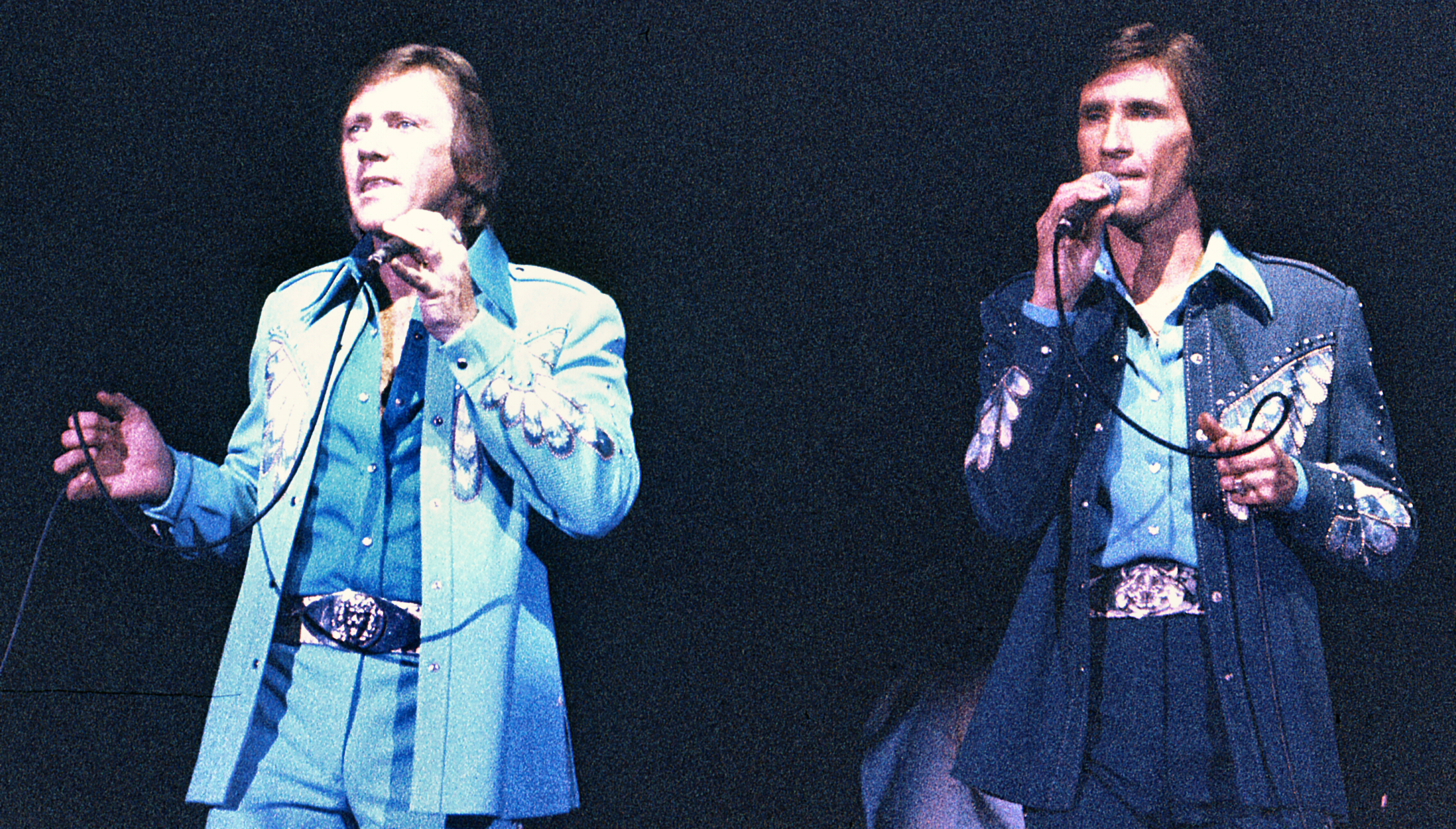
The Righteous Brothers performing at Knott's Berry Farm with Medley on the right and Hatfield on the left

Medley first met his singing partner Bobby Hatfield through Barry Rillera, who was in both Hatfield's and Medley's bands (the Variations and the aforementioned Paramours, respectively) and asked them to see each other's shows. In 1962 they formed a new group but kept the name the Paramours, which included saxophonist John Wimber, who went on to found The Vineyard Church movement. They performed at The Black Derby nightclub in Santa Ana and released the single "There She Goes (She's Walking Away)" in December 1962 through independent record label Moonglow. However, the band did not have much success and soon broke up, leaving Hatfield and Medley to perform as a duo in 1963.

Medley and Hatfield adopted the name the Righteous Brothers, and their first single was the Medley-penned "Little Latin Lupe Lu", released through Moonglow Records. Medley also recorded as a solo artist with Moonglow, releasing the single "Gotta Tell You How I Feel", which did not chart.

In 1964, the Righteous Brothers appeared in a show with other groups at The Cow Palace in San Francisco, where Phil Spector was conducting the band for the entire show. Spector was impressed by the duo and arranged to have them record for his label Philles Records.

In 1965, they had their first No. 1 hit with "You've Lost That Lovin' Feelin'", produced by Spector. According to music-publishing watchdog Broadcast Music, Inc., "You've Lost That Lovin' Feelin'" is the most-played song in the history of American radio.

They recorded other songs such as "Unchained Melody" with Philles Records, as well. Medley, who had produced the duo before they signed with Spector and Philles, was the actual producer on many tracks and B-sides credited to Spector, including "Unchained Melody", which was originally intended to be only an album track. On singles such as "You've Lost That Lovin' Feelin'" and "Just Once in My Life," the vocals were concentrated mainly on Medley, but on a few singles, such as "Unchained Melody" and "Ebb Tide," Hatfield performed solo.

The duo left Spector in 1966 to sign with Verve Records, where they had a hit with "Soul and Inspiration", but broke up in 1968 when Medley left to pursue his own career. Medley was performing three shows a night in Las Vegas; according to Medley, he found it too much of a strain on his voice singing solo and lost his voice for a while. Under advice, he sought out Hatfield to reform the Righteous Brothers in 1974.

They signed with Haven Records and quickly recorded "Rock and Roll Heaven", which became a hit. In 1976, Medley decided to quit music for some time after the death of his first wife. He reunited with Hatfield in 1981 for the 30th-anniversary special of American Bandstand, where they performed an updated version of "Rock and Roll Heaven". Although Medley focused his attention on his solo career in the 1980s, they continued to appear together as a duo.

After a resurgence in popularity in 1990s due to the use of "Unchained Melody" in the film Ghost, they toured extensively as a duo until Hatfield's death in November 2003. The Righteous Brothers were inducted into the Rock and Roll Hall of Fame in March 2003 by Billy Joel.

In January 2016, Medley announced that he would revive the Righteous Brothers for the first time since 2003, partnering with new singer Bucky Heard.

After six decades of touring, in early 2024 Medley announced his forthcoming retirement with the Righteous Brothers; the Lovin' Feelin' Farewell Tour. Medley indicated it was mainly a retirement from touring and that he still planned on writing and recording music and did not rule out hiring and mentoring a successor to keep The Righteous Brothers active.

== Career outside the Righteous Brothers ==
Medley has also had a moderately successful solo career. In 1968, Medley first recorded "I Can't Make It Alone" written by Carole King, but the song failed to make much of an impact. The following singles, "Brown Eyed Woman" written by Mann and Weil, and "Peace, Brother, Peace" both performed better, and were top 40 pop hits. In 1969, he won second place at the Festival Internacional da Canção (FIC) in Rio de Janeiro with the song "Evie" by Jimmy Webb. Medley performed "Hey Jude" at the 1969 Grammy Awards and was then signed to A&M Records, which released a number of his records. One of his recordings, "Freedom and Fear" from Michel Colombier's album Wings, was nominated for a Grammy in 1972.

Medley released several solo albums during the 1970s and 1980s. He enjoyed a resurgence in his career in the 1980s.

In 1979, his song "I Want To Make You Smile" was recorded by Kenny Rogers for his self-titled album "Kenny", which included the global hit Coward of the County with "I Want To Make You Smile" placed on the B-side.

Medley then released the album Sweet Thunder in 1980, containing a version of "Don't Know Much", which was originally written and performed by Barry Mann the same year. He signed with Planet Records in 1982 and later with RCA Records. In 1984 and 1985, he charted five singles on the country charts, the biggest of these being the top 20 country hit "I Still Do", which also crossed over to the Adult Contemporary chart, and later became a cult hit with the Carolina Beach/Shag dance-club circuit. One of Medley's minor entries, "All I Need to Know", was later recorded as "Don't Know Much" in a Grammy-winning duet by Linda Ronstadt and Aaron Neville; this was a long-running No. 2 Hot 100 and No. 1 Adult Contemporary hit in 1989–90.

In 1987, Medley's duet with Jennifer Warnes, "(I've Had) The Time of My Life", was included on the Dirty Dancing soundtrack, and the single reached number one on the Billboard Hot 100. The song won Medley and Warnes a 1988 Grammy Award for Best Pop Performance by a Duo or Group with Vocal and an Academy Award for Best Original Song for the composers.

Among Medley's other notable songs are "Most of All You", the closing theme to the film Major League; "Friday Night's a Great Night for Football" from Tony Scott's film The Last Boy Scout; and the theme song for the Growing Pains spinoff Just the Ten of Us. He also collaborated with Giorgio Moroder and scored a moderate UK hit in 1988 with a version of "He Ain't Heavy, He's My Brother". Medley made a video for the song which was also used over the closing credits for the film Rambo III.

In 1985, Medley and Hatfield opened The Hop, a rock & roll-themed nightclub, on Brookhurst Street in Fountain Valley, Orange County, California. They later expanded the franchise to include another club of the same name in Lakewood, California.

Medley appeared in the two-part episode "Finally!" of the hit television show, Cheers. In 1998 Medley, along with Jennifer Warnes, sang "Show Me the Light" over the closing credits of Rudolph the Red-Nosed Reindeer: The Movie. He also recorded a vocal track for the song Lullabye on Jimmy Chamberlin's (of Smashing Pumpkins fame) solo album, Life Begins Again.

=== Recent work ===
Through the mid to late 2000s, Medley performed mainly in Branson, Missouri, at Dick Clark's American Bandstand Theater, Andy Williams' Moon River Theater, and The Starlite Theatre.

In 2004, DBC Management released his album Your Heart to Mine – Dedicated to the Blues (later released on Fuel Records in 2013).

In 2007, Medley released his first new album since the passing of his long-time Righteous Brothers partner, Bobby Hatfield, who died on November 5, 2003. The album was titled Damn Near Righteous and released on Westlake Records (later released on Varese Sarabande in 2014). The soulful album featured a memorable track collaboration on "In My Room" with Brian Wilson (Beach Boys) and Phil Everly (Everly Brothers), plus new originals "Sit Down and Hurt", "Something Blue", and "Beautiful".

Medley later also began touring with his daughter McKenna and her 3-Bottle Band. On November 24, 2013, he performed in concert for the first time in the UK at Wembley Arena.

Medley wrote a memoir entitled The Time of My Life: A Righteous Brother's Memoir. The book was published in 2014.

Medley released his first new album in over a decade, Straight from the Heart, on February 14, 2025. The album features a 12-song collection of covers by country music artists. Straight from the Heart was produced by Fred Mollin and was released on Curb Records. Medley last recorded on the Curb label in 1991 with the album Blue Eyed Singer. The first single from the album, "These Days", was released on October 18, 2024, as a duet with country musician Vince Gill. The album also features duets with renowned artists such as Michael McDonald, Shawn Colvin, and Keb Mo. In support of his new album, Medley made his debut at the Grand Ole Opry on February 22, 2025.

== Personal life ==
Medley met his first wife, Karen O'Grady, in church. They started dating in 1963 and married at the beginning of his music career. Their son, Darrin, was born in 1965, but they divorced when Darrin was about five years old. Medley married Suzi Robertson in 1970, then Janice Gorham, but each marriage was soon annulled. He was a close friend of Elvis Presley.

In January 1976, his first wife, Karen, by then remarried and named Karen Klaas, was raped and murdered by a stranger. Medley decided to take time off from his music career to look after his son. Medley employed a private investigator in an unsuccessful effort to track down the killer. On January 27, 2017, the Los Angeles County Sheriff's Department announced that investigators used a new DNA testing method to solve the decades-old murder. The sheriff's department said that the case "was solved through the use of familial DNA, which identified the killer", Kenneth Troyer, a sex offender and fugitive killed by police in 1982.

Medley married Paula Vasu in 1986. The couple had a daughter named McKenna, born in 1987, who was also a singer. She performed with Medley as his duet partner on "(I've Had) The Time of My Life". Paula died of Parkinson's disease on June 8, 2020.

In May 2020, Medley underwent surgery to remove a cancerous tumor from his throat.

== Awards and nominations ==
Medley was nominated for Best Arrangement Accompanying Vocalist in the 1972 Grammy Awards for his recording of "Freedom and Fear", a track from Michel Colombier's album Wings.

In 1988, Medley received a Grammy Award for Best Pop Performance by a Duo or Group with Vocals for his duet with Jennifer Warnes on "(I've Had) The Time of My Life".

== Discography ==
=== Albums ===
| Year | Album | Peak chart positions | | Label |
| Year | Album | US | US Country | Label |
|---|---|---|---|---|
| 1968 | Bill Medley 100% | 188 | — | MGM |
| 1969 | Soft and Soulful | 152 | — | MGM |
| 1970 | Gone | — | — | A&M |
| 1970 | Someone Is Standing Outside | — | — | A&M |
| 1971 | A Song for You | — | — | A&M |
| 1973 | Smile | — | — | A&M |
| 1978 | Lay a Little Lovin' on Me | — | — | United Artists |
| 1981 | Sweet Thunder | — | — | Liberty |
| 1982 | Right Here and Now | — | — | Planet |
| 1984 | I Still Do | — | 58 | RCA |
| 1985 | Still Hung Up on You | — | — | RCA |
| 1988 | The Best of Bill Medley | — | — | MCA/Curb |
| 1991 | Blue Eyed Singer | | | Curb |
| 1993 | Going Home | — | — | Essential |
| 1996 | Christmas Memories | — | — | Rocktopia |
| 1997 | Almost Home | — | — | Rocktopia |
| 2004 | Your Heart to Mine - Dedicated to the Blues | — | — | DBC Management |
| 2007 | Damn Near Righteous | — | — | Westlake |
| 2025 | Straight from the Heart | TBD | TBD | Curb |
"—" denotes releases that did not chart

=== Singles ===
| Year | Single | Peak chart positions | | | | | | | | Album |
| Year | Single | US | US AC | US Country | CAN | CAN AC | CAN Country | AUS | UK | Album |
|---|---|---|---|---|---|---|---|---|---|---|
| 1968 | "I Can't Make It Alone" | 95 | — | — | 63 | — | — | — | — | Bill Medley 100% |
| 1968 | "Brown Eyed Woman" | 43 | — | — | 36 | — | — | — | — | Bill Medley 100% |
| 1968 | "Peace Brother Peace" | 48 | — | — | 42 | — | — | — | — | Soft and Soulful |
| 1969 | "This Is a Love Song" | 112 | — | — | — | — | — | — | — | Non-album single |
| 1979 | "Statue of a Fool" | — | — | 91 | — | — | — | — | — | Lay a Little Lovin' on Me |
| 1981 | "Don't Know Much" | 88 | 29 | — | — | — | — | — | — | Sweet Thunder |
| 1982 | "Right Here and Now" | 58 | 31 | — | — | — | — | — | — | Right Here and Now |
| 1984 | "Til Your Memory's Gone" | — | — | 28 | — | — | 20 | — | — | I Still Do |
| 1984 | "I Still Do" | — | 25 | 17 | — | — | 22 | — | — | I Still Do |
| 1984 | "I've Always Got the Heart to Sing the Blues" | — | — | 26 | — | — | 41 | — | — | I Still Do |
| 1985 | "Is There Anything I Can Do" | — | — | 47 | — | — | 46 | — | — | Still Hung Up on You |
| 1985 | "Women in Love" | — | — | 55 | — | — | — | — | — | Still Hung Up on You |
| 1986 | "Loving on Borrowed Time" (with Gladys Knight) | — | 16 | — | — | — | — | — | — | Cobra (soundtrack) |
| 1987 | "(I've Had) The Time of My Life" (with Jennifer Warnes) | 1 | 1 | — | 1 | 3 | — | 1 | 6 | Dirty Dancing (soundtrack) |
| 1988 | "He Ain't Heavy, He's My Brother" | — | 49 | — | — | — | — | 87 | 25 | Rambo III (soundtrack) |
| 1989 | "I'm Gonna Be Strong" | — | — | — | — | — | — | 114 | — | Non-album single |
"—" denotes releases that did not chart
