= I Still Do (song) =

Single by Bill Medley

from the album I Still Do
- B-side: "I've Got Dreams to Remember"
- Released: 1984
- Genre: Country
- Length: 2:55
- Label: RCA
- Songwriter(s): J. D. Martin; John Jarrard
- Producer(s): Jerry Crutchfield

Bill Medley singles chronology
"Til Your Memory's Gone" (1984)	"I Still Do" (1984)	"I've Always Got the Heart to Sing the Blues" (1984)

"I Still Do" is a song by Bill Medley from the album of the same name. Among his country music singles, this one charted the highest, reaching #17 on the Billboard Hot Country Songs chart. The song is described as being part of Medley's shift into country music. The song moved into the adult contemporary charts becoming a "cult" hit with the Carolina Beach/Shag dance club circuit.

== Premise ==
The song involves the singer addressing his wife, stating that despite all of the challenges that life has thrown in the way of the couple, that he is still committed to the marriage to which he agreed many years before.

== Charts ==
Chart (1984–85)	Peak position
US Hot Country Singles (Billboard)	17
US Adult Contemporary (Billboard)	25
