= Judith Fox =

American photographer and writer

Judith Fox is an American poet, writer, photographer, and a former business owner.

== Life ==
Fox, who was a freelance writer and owned a photography studio in New York in the early 1970s, started exhibiting her fine art photographs in 2002; since then her work has been in solo and group exhibitions in galleries and museums in North America and Europe.

She has published a number of books of photography, about grief and resilience.

Fox lives and works in southern California.

== Career ==
Fox's photographs are in the permanent collections of the Los Angeles County Museum of Art (LACMA), the Virginia Museum of Fine Arts (VMFA), the Museum of Photographic Arts (MOPA), the Southeast Museum of Photography (SMP), The Patrick and Beatrice Haggerty Museum of Art at Marquette University, the Harry Ransom Center at the University of Texas at Austin and the Samuel P. Harn Museum of Art at the University of Florida. Her work is held in private and corporate collections throughout the world.

Fox's first husband, Jerry Fox, died in 1992. In 1995, she married Dr Edmund F. Ackell, a surgeon and President Emeritus of Virginia Commonwealth University. In November 2009, Fox's book, I Still Do: Loving and Living with Alzheimer’s was published by powerHouse Books. The book was selected one of photo-eye Magazine's best books of 2009 and is currently in its third printing.

In 1978, Fox founded a temporary service in Richmond, Virginia. She purchased Rosemary Scott Temporaries (in Manhattan) in 1985 and expanded to other locations before selling Judith Fox Staffing Companies to a New York Stock Exchange firm in 1996.

Her book One Foot Forward, featuring personal stories of twenty widowed women and men, was published by powerHouse Books in 2013.
