= Damn Near Righteous =

Studio album by Bill Medley
- Released: September 25, 2007
- Genre: Blue-eyed soul
- Label: Varèse Sarabande
- Producers: Steve Dorff and Shayne Fair

Bill Medley chronology
Going Home (1993)	Damn Near Righteous (2007)

Damn Near Righteous is an album from Bill Medley, produced by Steve Dorff and Shayne Fair. The album was released on a limited basis on September 25, 2007, but was rereleased worldwide by Varèse Sarabande and distributed by Universal Music on November 11, 2014. The album was completed four years after Bobby Hatfield, Bill's former partner in The Righteous Brothers died.

== Songs ==
The album features a mixture of new and old songs (with cover versions of Ray Charles' "Lonely Avenue" and Brian Wilson's "In My Room"), and includes musicians such as Brian Wilson and Phil Everly. Medley gave a twist to several of the songs.

- Made Earl King's "Trick Bag" more upbeat
- Stripped down Bob Dylan's song "Just Like a Woman" to be paired with only a bluesy piano
- Paired the harmonious voices Brian Wilson, and the late Phil Everly of the Everly Brothers on The Beach Boys' "In My Room".
- Closed the album with "California Goodbye," written by the producers, paying final respects to Bobby Hatfield

== Track listing ==
1. "Sit Down & Hurt" – 3:44
2. "Trick Bag" – 4:11
3. "Something Blue" – 3:59
4. "Lonely Avenue " – 3:34
5. "In My Room" – 3:39
6. "Hurt City" – 3:48
7. "Just Like a Woman" – 4:50
8. "I'll Find Someone Who Will" – 4:50
9. "Beautiful" – 3:27
10. "Two Lives" – 3:56
11. "Rock My Baby" – 3:48
12. "California Goodbye" – 3:47
13. "Blue Denim Blues" – 3:25

== Personnel ==
- Dean Parks
- Vinnie Colaiuta
- J.R. Robinson
- Joe Chemay
- Jimmy Nichols
- McKenna Medley
- Jeffrey Foskett
