= Brian Wilson Presents Pet Sounds Live =

Live album by Brian Wilson
- Released: June 11, 2002
- Recorded: January 27–30, 2002
- Venue: Royal Festival Hall, London
- Length: 43:09
- Label: Sanctuary
- Producer: Brian Wilson

Brian Wilson chronology
Live at the Roxy Theatre (2000)	Brian Wilson Presents Pet Sounds Live (2002)	Gettin' In over My Head (2004)

Professional ratings
Review scores
Source	Rating
AllMusic	2.5/5 stars
The Rolling Stone Album Guide	2.5/5 stars

Brian Wilson Presents Pet Sounds Live is the second live album by American musician Brian Wilson. It features a performance of the Beach Boys' 1966 album Pet Sounds, recorded by Wilson and his band at the Royal Festival Hall in London in January 2002.

== Track listing ==
No.	Title	Writer(s)	Length
1.	"Show Intro"		0:30
2.	"Wouldn't It Be Nice"	Brian Wilson, Tony Asher, Mike Love	2:54
3.	"You Still Believe in Me"	B. Wilson, Asher	3:04
4.	"That's Not Me"	B. Wilson, Asher	2:22
5.	"Don't Talk (Put Your Head on My Shoulder)"	B. Wilson, Asher	3:07
6.	"I'm Waiting for the Day"	B. Wilson, Love	3:30
7.	"Let's Go Away for Awhile"	B. Wilson	2:51
8.	"Sloop John B"	traditional, arranged by B. Wilson	3:26
9.	"God Only Knows"	B. Wilson, Asher	3:13
10.	"I Know There's an Answer"	B. Wilson, Terry Sachen, Love	3:05
11.	"Here Today"	B. Wilson, Asher	3:15
12.	"I Just Wasn't Made for These Times"	B. Wilson, Asher	3:30
13.	"Pet Sounds"	B. Wilson	4:06
14.	"Caroline, No"	B. Wilson, Asher	4:16
Total length:			43:09

Japan-exclusive bonus tracks
No.	Title	Writer(s)	Length
15.	"Meant for You"	B. Wilson, Love	0:31
16.	"Friends"	B. Wilson, Carl Wilson, Dennis Wilson, Al Jardine	2:51

== Personnel ==
- Brian Wilson – lead vocals, keyboards, arrangements
- Jeffrey Foskett - lead vocals, harmony and backing vocals, guitar
- Probyn Gregory – harmony and backing vocals, guitar, French horn, trumpet, Electro-Theremin, keyboards
- Nick Walusko – harmony and backing vocals, guitar
- Bob Lizik – bass guitar
- Darian Sahanaja – vocals, keyboards, vibraphone
- Scott Bennett – harmony and backing vocals, keyboards, vibraphone, percussion
- Jim Hines – harmony and backing vocals, drums
- Mike D'Amico - harmony and backing vocals, percussion
- Paul von Mertens – tenor and baritone saxophones, flute, alto flute, clarinet, harmonica
- Taylor Mills – harmony and backing vocals, percussion
- Andy Paley – percussion, guitar

Production

- Brian Wilson – producer
- Mark Linett – recording, mixing
