= Imagination (Brian Wilson album) =

1998 studio album by Brian Wilson

Studio album by Brian Wilson
- Released: June 16, 1998
- Recorded: Late 1997 – early 1998
- Studios: Brian Wilson's house; Shrimpboat (Key West); Ocean Way Recording (Hollywood); Masterfonics (Nashville)
- Genres: Pop; soft rock; adult contemporary
- Length: 39:09
- Label: Giant
- Producers: Brian Wilson; Joe Thomas

Brian Wilson chronology
Orange Crate Art (1995)	Imagination (1998)	Live at the Roxy Theatre (2000)

Singles from Imagination
- 1. "Your Imagination" / "Happy Days" Released: May 19, 1998; 2. "South American" Released: June 16, 1998

Imagination is the third solo album by American musician Brian Wilson. It was issued in 1998 on Giant Records and distributed by Warner Music Group. The album received mixed reviews upon its release and its commercial performance was relatively weak. Its best-known track is "Your Imagination", a Top 20 hit on adult contemporary radio. The second single, "South American", was co-written by Jimmy Buffett. Wilson dedicated the song "Lay Down Burden" to his brother Carl Wilson, who succumbed to cancer earlier in the year.

Joe Thomas worked with Wilson as the album's co-producer. He was held responsible by critics for the album's style and production. Shortly after its release, Wilson filed a suit against Thomas, seeking damages and a declaration which freed him to work on his next album without involvement from Thomas. They later reunited for the Beach Boys reunion album That's Why God Made the Radio (2012) and its followup No Pier Pressure (2015).

== Background ==
The album's recording sessions were immediately preceded by plans for a Beach Boys reunion album of new original material. According to Sean O'Hagan of the High Llamas, he was involved at one point, but backed away once it became clear to him that the project was unlikely to happen, also expressing disapproval with the "middle of the road" style that producer and collaborator Joe Thomas was persuading Wilson toward.

== Recording ==
Wilson covered two of his own Beach Boys songs for Imagination: "Keep an Eye on Summer" and "Let Him Run Wild". He had been dissatisfied with the vocal on the latter track, considering it too shrill and had named it his least favorite Beach Boys recording.

In addition, "She Says That She Needs Me" was the result of a lyric re-write by Carole Bayer Sager of an original Wilson composition from the mid-1960s, while the closing song, "Happy Days", featured recycled elements of an unreleased Beach Boys track, "My Solution", from 1970, and a piano riff from a SMiLE era track, "Holidays".

I wasn't having that much fun at the time. ... I just thought people were out to kill me. I had a fantasy in my head that people were out to murder me. I just couldn't deal with it. I just sort of flipped out.

— Brian Wilson on the Imagination era, 1999

Thomas explained the differences between him and Andy Paley: "I think that Andy more comes from that historical perspective than I do. I mean he knows a lot more about the way Brian recorded stuff back in the ‘60s. ... I’ve got my guys that I really like. And the fact is that right now, I also don't like to record with a lot of people in the room at the same time. My reasoning is that I just can’t keep track of what’s going on. I think it’s a different way of recording that Brian likes this time around."

In 2006, biographer Peter Ames Carlin wrote: "Joe took it upon himself to make sure that the new songs sounded as adult contemporary radio as possible. Most were dominated by tinkling keyboards, with plenty of melodic interjections from a gently plucked nylon-string guitar. If Brian tried to use an instrument or an arrangement that might not fit into the soothing blend, Joe would shake his head and slice it out of the picture. And if this bothered Brian, he didn't show it." Brian reportedly stated: "We call it a Brian Wilson album, but it's really a Joe Thomas/Brian Wilson album."

When it came time to arrange Wilson's songs for live performances, backing band member Darian Sahanaja remembers Thomas wanting to turn "Caroline, No" into a "sexy, Sade kind of thing". He added: "When liberties were taken, his [Brian's] response would be, "Uh, cool." Or he wouldn't respond at all, so you'd have to ask, and he'd say, "I think it sounds, uh, good." But as soon as we did a song close to his original arrangement, he'd go nuts: "Wow! Outtasite!" And then he'd want to hear it again. And that made perfect sense to me."

Many outtakes would later be revived for the Beach Boys' 2012 reunion album That's Why God Made the Radio with Thomas' involvement.

== Release ==
Imagination (Giant 24703) hit #88 in the US during a chart stay of 2 weeks. It reached #30 in the UK. On May 9, 1998, to promote the release of Imagination, Wilson performed a live taping for VH-1 at the St. Charles East High School auditorium in St. Charles, Illinois. The live performance included guest performances from Christopher Cross, Beach Boys member Bruce Johnston, and Eagles members Joe Walsh, Timothy B. Schmit and Steve Dahl. The concert, which was later incorporated with additional interviews from Elvis Costello, Eric Clapton, Sean Lennon, Stevie Wonder, and Jimmy Buffett, was released on VHS in 1998 and DVD in 1999 but is currently out-of-print. "Your Imagination" and "Lay Down Burden" were aired as music videos on VH1, with the album audio played over the video, and clips of Brian walking through the woods "thinking" and "day dreaming" and images of him and his brothers on the screen. He supported the album with a tour, beginning with the Late Show with David Letterman on August 14, 1998.

A 5.1 channel surround remix of the album in the DTS CD format was also released by DTS Entertainment in 1998 (71021-51018-2-8).

== Reception ==
Professional ratings
Review scores
Source	Rating
AllMusic	3/5 stars
Chicago Sun-Times	3/5 stars
Christgau's Consumer Guide	C
Entertainment Weekly	B
MusicHound Rock	3/5 stars
NME	6/10
Rolling Stone	3/5 stars
The Rolling Stone Album Guide	2/5 stars
Spin	3/10

On the subject of fans' reactions, Carlin wrote: "Imagination bore many distressing signs. The real Brian Wilson would never homogenize his music to sound exactly like every other song on the radio, they complained." In an article for Rolling Stone, Jason Fine said the album showed "little evidence of Brian's creative spark. Though he contributes some of his finest vocals — especially on two ballads, 'Cry' and 'Lay Down Burden' — the album's saccharine soft rock doesn't hint at the subtle magic of a classic Brian Wilson production."

Barney Hoskyns reviewed the album for Spin and wrote: "the man's penchant for writing these days in cheery major keys, coupled with the record's horribly sterile sound, turns songs such as 'Sunshine' and 'Your Imagination' into nothing more than goofy retreads of early Beach Boys hits." John Mulvey of NME opined of the record: "if there is one character flaw that has blighted [Wilson']s music over the past 25-odd years, it has been his capacity to be easily led, his need to work with others resulting in a touching but misplaced faith in a host of lesser musical talents who frequently aren't fit to wipe his arse, let alone collaborate with him." Music critic Robert Christgau declared: "Submitting to adult-contempo tycoon Joe Thomas ... [Wilson is] just what you'd fear: a middle-aged pop pro who's proud he's no longer nuts and knows even less about the world than when he was."

In 2000, Wilson said of Imagination, "I don't like the sound. I don't like my voice on it." When Andy Paley was asked to compare his collaborations with Brian to Thomas', Paley responded: "I think that the music is very, very different. Let’s put it this way... what he and I did is not an album. First of all, it’s way more stuff than you can put on an album, it’s probably more like four albums. It was something we enjoyed doing."

== Track listing ==
No.	Title	Writer(s)	Length
1.	"Your Imagination"	Brian Wilson; Joe Thomas; Steve Dahl	3:38
2.	"She Says That She Needs Me"	Wilson; Russ Titelman; Carole Bayer Sager	3:59
3.	"South American"	Wilson; Thomas; Jimmy Buffett	3:44
4.	"Where Has Love Been?"	Wilson; Andy Paley; JD Souther	2:17
5.	"Keep an Eye on Summer"	Wilson; Mike Love; Bob Norberg	2:48
6.	"Dream Angel"	Wilson; Thomas; Jim Peterik	3:21
7.	"Cry"	Wilson	4:56
8.	"Lay Down Burden"	Wilson; Thomas	3:44
9.	"Let Him Run Wild"	Wilson; Love	2:29
10.	"Sunshine"	Wilson; Thomas	3:20
11.	"Happy Days"	Wilson	4:44

== Personnel ==
Personnel taken from Imagination CD booklet.

- Brian Wilson – lead and backing vocals (all tracks), keyboards (4, 5, 8, 11), Hammond organ (1, 10), acoustic piano (11)

Additional musicians

- Joe Thomas – acoustic piano (1–3, 7–10), timpani (1), accordion (4), additional keyboards (1, 4, 5), Hammond B-3 organ (6, 11), vibraphone (8, 9), programming (6, 8), keyboards (9), percussion (10)
- Jimmy Buffett – backing vocals (3)
- Eddie Bayers – drums (1, 2, 4, 6, 7, 9–11)
- Todd Sucherman – drums (5, 8)
- Michael Rhodes – bass guitar (1, 2, 4, 6, 7, 9–11)
- Jason Trtan – additional bass (1), French Horn (6)
- Bob Lizik – bass guitar (8)
- Jim Peterik – acoustic and electric guitars (1), additional guitar (6)
- Brent Rowan – acoustic guitar (1, 8–10), electric guitar (1, 9–11), nylon-string guitar (8), mandolin (10), sitar (10, 11)
- Greg Leisz – acoustic guitar (3, 4, 6, 7), electric guitar (3, 6, 7), additional guitar (5)
- Scott Bennett – electric guitar (5, 8)
- Paul Mertens – clarinet (1, 2, 8, 10, 11), bass clarinet (1), flute (2, 8, 11), alto saxophone (3, 8, 9, 11), baritone saxophone (3, 8–11)
- Richie Cannata – saxophone (2)
- Larry Franklin – violin (2, 4, 5), viola (2, 4, 5)
- Chuck Soumar – piccolo trumpet (1), trumpet (3, 9, 11)
- John Larson – trumpet (3, 9, 11)
- Jackie Bertone – percussion (1, 3, 4, 7, 11)

Technical personnel

- Brian Wilson – producer, arranger
- Joe Thomas – producer, arranger
- Bob Ludwig – mastering
- Frank Pappalardo – engineer
