= What I Really Want for Christmas =

Studio album by Brian Wilson
- Released: October 18, 2005
- Recorded: April – May 2005
- Genre: Christmas
- Length: 46:04
- Label: Arista
- Producer: Brian Wilson

Brian Wilson chronology
Brian Wilson Presents Smile (2004)	What I Really Want for Christmas (2005)	That Lucky Old Sun (2008)

Professional ratings
Review scores
Source	Rating
AllMusic	3/5 stars
The Independent	3/5 stars

What I Really Want for Christmas is the sixth studio album by Brian Wilson and his first solo seasonal release. It was released by Arista Records in October 2005 and features many traditional Christmas songs, as well some of Wilson's originals, including remakes of the Beach Boys' "Little Saint Nick" and "The Man with All the Toys". As a bonus, Wilson elected to include a sampling of seasonal recordings initially available on his website a few years earlier.

== Track listing ==
All tracks traditional, arranged by Brian Wilson; except where indicated

No.	Title	Writer(s)	Length
1.	"The Man with All the Toys"	Wilson, Mike Love	2:59
2.	"What I Really Want for Christmas"	Wilson, Bernie Taupin	3:50
3.	"God Rest Ye Merry Gentlemen"		3:27
4.	"O Holy Night"		4:28
5.	"We Wish You a Merry Christmas"		2:36
6.	"Hark the Herald Angels Sing"		3:34
7.	"It Came Upon a Midnight Clear"		3:08
8.	"The First Noel"		4:47
9.	"Christmasey"	Wilson, Jimmy Webb	4:08
10.	"Little Saint Nick"	Brian Wilson, Mike Love	2:11
11.	"Deck the Halls"		2:36
12.	"Auld Lang Syne"		1:29
Total length:			44:31

Bonus tracks
No.	Title	Writer(s)	Length
13.	"On Christmas Day"	Wilson	3:23
14.	"Joy to the World"		2:06
15.	"Silent Night"		0:49

Tracks 13–15 are bonus tracks, 13 and 15 having originally appeared on Wilson's website during 2000 and 2001. Track 14 was co-produced by an uncredited Joe Thomas and originally released in October 1997 on an obscure Christmas compilation.

== Personnel ==
- Brian Wilson – vocals, piano; producer

Additional personnel

- Jeffrey Foskett – vocals, guitar, sleigh bells
- Darian Sahanaja – vocals, piano, organ, vibraphone, glockenspiel
- Scott Bennett – vocals, piano, organ, vibraphone, glockenspiel
- Nicky "Wonder" Walusko – vocals, guitar
- Probyn Gregory – vocals, guitar, French horn, flugelhorn, trumpet
- Paul Mertens – saxophone, flute, harmonica
- Bob Lizik – bass
- Jim Hines – drums
- Nelson Bragg – vocals, percussion
- Taylor Mills – vocals
- John Yoakum – baritone saxophone, oboe
- Robbie Hioki – trombone, bass trombone
- Peter Kent – violin
- Sharon Jackson – violin
- Karen Elaine Bakunin – viola
- Erika Duke-Kirkpatrick – cello
- Carol Robbins – harp
- Mark Linett – recording and mix engineer

== Reception ==
Critical reaction was mixed; Alexis Petridis of The Guardian newspaper gave it one star out of five and criticized it: "What I Really Want For Christmas is the least fascinating album of Wilson's career, and may well be the least fascinating album of Christmas - which, given the seasonal presence of G4 in the charts, is not a phrase to bandy lightly. It features two new songs: Christmassy, which is appalling, and the title track, which is even worse." The album eventually peaked at #200 for one week on the Billboard 200 chart in the US, though "Deck the Halls" became a Top 10 Adult Contemporary hit.
