= Live at the Roxy Theatre =

Live album by Brian Wilson
- Released: June 2000 (original release); June 19, 2001 (first reissue); November 7, 2025 (second/expanded 25th anniversary reissue)
- Recorded: April 7–8, 2000
- Venue: Roxy Theatre, West Hollywood, CA
- Genre: Rock
- Length: 1:45:28
- Label: Brimel Records; Oglio Records (2001 and 2025 reissues)
- Producer: Brian Wilson

Brian Wilson chronology
Imagination (1998)	Live at the Roxy Theatre (2000)	Pet Sounds Live (2002)

Professional ratings
Review scores
Source	Rating
AllMusic	4/5 stars
The Rolling Stone Album Guide	3/5 stars

Live at the Roxy Theatre is a live album released by Brian Wilson in 2000. After a successful period of touring following the release of Imagination, Wilson decided to record his first-ever live solo album. Accompanied by his supporting band, Wilson recorded the album during a pair of shows at the Roxy Theatre in West Hollywood.

While the album includes performances of several of Wilson's old Beach Boys favorites, there are a few surprises amid the well-known classics. Wilson takes the opportunity to introduce two songs: "The First Time" and "This Isn't Love" (itself a collaboration with Pet Sounds lyricist Tony Asher and used in the movie The Flintstones in Viva Rock Vegas). In addition, in a moment of humor, the flesh and blood Wilson sings a portion of Barenaked Ladies' song "Brian Wilson". Because of Wilson's continuing ease in front of audiences, and the confident performances throughout, Live at the Roxy Theatre received positive reviews upon release.

Live at the Roxy Theatre was initially and exclusively distributed through Wilson's freshly inaugurated website in June 2000 on his own Brimel Records label for one year. An independent label, Oglio Records, subsequently redistributed Live at the Roxy Theatre in 2001 to stores with the addition of three bonus tracks; a 2002 reissue was available in the UK on Sanctuary Records with five bonus tracks on disc two of the set. There was also an additional Japanese release with six bonus tracks, also on disc two.

An expanded 25th anniversary edition of the album was released by Oglio Records on November 7, 2025, featuring additional live bonus tracks from other periods in Wilson's solo touring career. Since then, the album is available on streaming services after previously not been available there.

== Track listing ==
All songs by Brian Wilson and Mike Love, except where noted.

=== Disc one ===
1. "Little Girl Intro" – 0:59
  - Uses excerpts from "The Little Girl I Once Knew"'s 13 October 1965 tracking date
2. "The Little Girl I Once Knew" (Brian Wilson) – 3:25
3. "This Whole World" (Brian Wilson) – 1:51
4. "Don't Worry Baby" (Brian Wilson, Roger Christian) – 3:27
5. "Kiss Me Baby" – 3:12
6. "Do It Again" – 3:25
7. "California Girls" – 4:07
8. "I Get Around" – 2:35
9. "Back Home" (Brian Wilson) – 4:34
10. "In My Room" (Brian Wilson, Gary Usher) – 2:48
11. "Surfer Girl" (Brian Wilson) – 3:03
12. "The First Time" (Brian Wilson) – 3:56
13. "This Isn't Love" (Brian Wilson, Tony Asher) – 3:55
14. "Add Some Music to Your Day" (Brian Wilson, Mike Love, Joe Knott) – 4:11
15. "Please Let Me Wonder" – 3:29

=== Disc two ===
1. "Band Intro" – 1:30
2. "Brian Wilson" (Steven Page) – 0:55
3. "Til I Die" (Brian Wilson) – 3:57
4. "Darlin' " – 2:51
5. "Let's Go Away for Awhile" (Brian Wilson) – 2:54
6. "Pet Sounds" (Brian Wilson) – 4:27
7. "God Only Knows" (Brian Wilson, Tony Asher) – 3:26
8. "Lay Down Burden" (Brian Wilson, Joe Thomas) – 3:29
9. "Be My Baby" (Ellie Greenwich, Phil Spector, Jeff Barry) – 4:11
  - A song popularized by The Ronettes in 1963 with which Wilson was obsessed
10. "Good Vibrations" – 6:02
11. "Caroline, No" (Brian Wilson, Tony Asher) – 5:00
12. "All Summer Long" – 3:12
13. "Love and Mercy" (Brian Wilson) – 3:52
14. "Sloop John B" (Traditional; arranged by Brian Wilson) – 3:34
15. "Barbara Ann" (Fred Fassert) – 2:44
16. "Interview With Brian" – 4:21
- Tracks 14–16 of Disc 2 are bonus tracks on the Oglio Records re-release in 2001

==== UK version ====
The second disc of the UK release features several bonus tracks:

16. "Wouldn't It Be Nice" (Brian Wilson, Tony Asher, Mike Love) – 2:46
17. "Help Me, Rhonda" – 4:26
18. "Fun, Fun, Fun" – 3:54
19. "Interview With Brian" – 4:21

Live at the Roxy Theatre (Brimel 1001/Oglio OGL 82012) never charted in the U.S. or the UK. It was also an exclusive internet release for 1 year on Brian Wilson's website, before being reissued in stores with exclusive bonus tracks.

== Personnel ==
Personnel taken from Live at the Roxy Theatre liner notes.

- Brian Wilson – vocals, keyboards, bass; producer, arrangements
- Jeffrey Foskett – vocals, guitar, percussion; arrangements
- Darian Sahanaja – vocals, keyboards, vibraphone; arrangement on "Brian Wilson"
- Nick Walusko – vocals, guitars
- Bob Lizik – basses
- Mike d'Amico – vocals, percussion, guitar
- Scott Bennett – vocals, keyboards, vibraphone, percussion; arrangement on "Brian Wilson"
- Jim Hines – vocals, drums
- Probyn Gregory – vocals, guitars, French horn, trumpet, Tannerin
- Paul von Mertens - alto & baritone saxophones, flute, piccolo
- Taylor Mills – vocals, percussion
- Mark Linett – recording, mixing
