= Your Imagination =

Single by Brian Wilson

from the album Imagination
- Released: May 19, 1998
- Genre: Rock
- Length: 3:40
- Label: Giant
- Songwriters: Brian Wilson; Joe Thomas; Steve Dahl
- Producers: Brian Wilson; Joe Thomas

Brian Wilson singles chronology
| "Do It Again" (1995) | "Your Imagination" (1998) | "Wonderful" (2004) |

"Your Imagination" is a song written by Brian Wilson, Joe Thomas and Steve Dahl for Brian Wilson's 1998 solo album Imagination. An alternate version of "Your Imagination" with slightly different lyrics and Steve Dahl singing lead was occasionally played in the late 1990s on Dahl's Chicago-based radio shows on WLUP-FM and WCKG.

Brian Wilson supplied the vocals on both lead and harmony through overdubbing. The lyrics refer obliquely to nostalgia for The Beach Boys ("another car running fast; another song on the beach," "I took a trip to the past"), while the arrangement references The Beatles' "Sgt. Pepper" with the piccolo trumpet in the chorus.[needs citation]

The Giant Records CD single release, on Giant 9280, included an a cappella version of "Your Imagination" along with the album track "Happy Days".

"Your Imagination" was featured in the live setlist for Brian Wilson's European tour in 2011.

== Personnel ==
Personnel taken from Imagination CD booklet.

- Brian Wilson – lead and backing vocals, Hammond B-3 organ
- Joe Thomas – acoustic piano, timpani, additional keyboards
- Michael Rhodes – bass
- Eddie Bayers – drums
- Jim Peterik – acoustic and electric guitars
- Paul Mertens – clarinet, bass clarinet
- Chuck Soumar – piccolo trumpet
- Jackie Bertone – percussion
- Jason Trtan – additional bass
