= That's Not Me (The Beach Boys song) =

1966 song by the Beach Boys

Song by the Beach Boys

from the album Pet Sounds
- Released: May 16, 1966
- Recorded: February 15, 1966
- Studio: Western, Hollywood
- Genre: Rock; chamber pop; psychedelic rock
- Length: 2:31
- Label: Capitol
- Songwriters: Brian Wilson; Tony Asher
- Producer: Brian Wilson

Licensed audio
- "That's Not Me" on YouTube

Audio sample
- file; help

"That's Not Me" is a song by the American rock band the Beach Boys from their 1966 album Pet Sounds. Written by Brian Wilson and Tony Asher, it is distinguished for its sophisticated harmonic structure and its sudden shifts in mood and instrumental textures. Owing to its relatively sparse orchestration, it is the track on Pet Sounds that most closely resembles a conventional rock song.

The lyric illustrates a young man in his path toward self-discovery and independence, ending with the realization that he is better living with a lover than pursuing a life of solitude in service to his dream. Wilson felt that the song revealed "a lot about" himself. Other writers speculate that the song may have been inspired by his use of psychedelic drugs or his withdrawal from regular concert appearances in the year prior.

Wilson produced "That's Not Me" at Western Studios in February 1966 with the aid of his bandmates alongside record producer Terry Melcher. Mike Love shares lead vocal with Wilson, who plays the track's prominent, buzzing organ. Brian's brothers Carl and Dennis also contribute guitar and drums, respectively.

== Background and lyrics ==
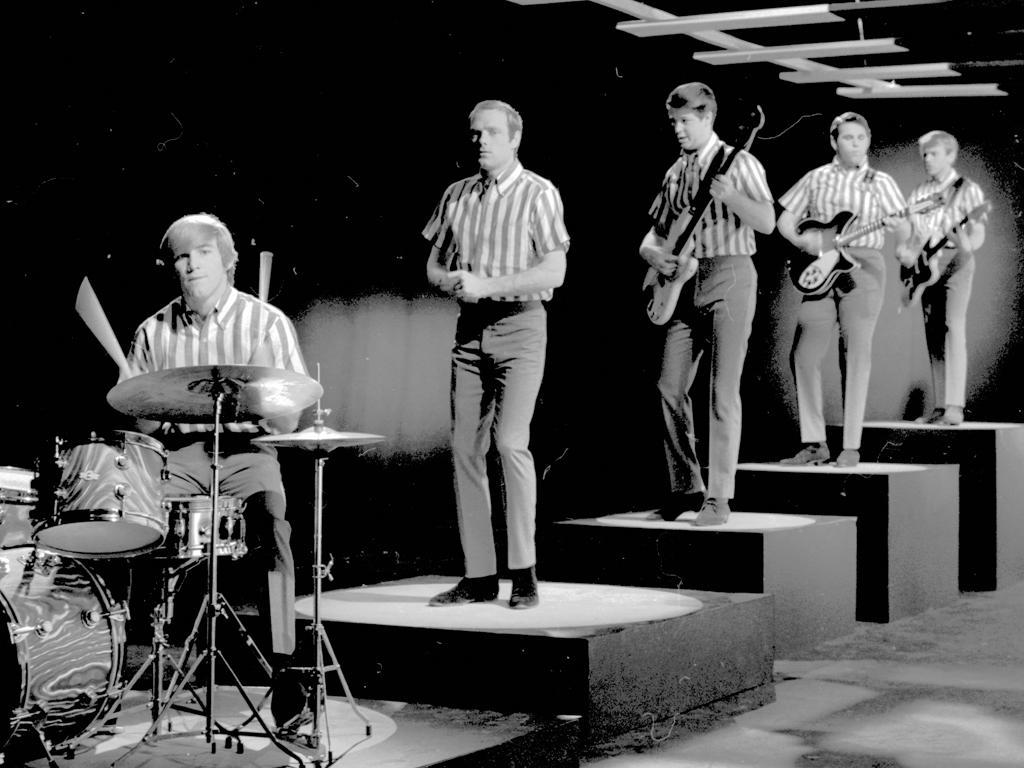
The Beach Boys performing in December 1964, just before Brian withdrew from their regular concert appearances

"That's Not Me" is among the several songs written by Brian Wilson and Tony Asher for the Beach Boys' album Pet Sounds. While it is commonly understood that Wilson composed the majority of the music on Pet Sounds, Asher contended that he himself had contributed musical ideas to several songs, including "That's Not Me".

The lyric illustrates a young man in his path toward self-discovery and independence ("I had to prove that I could make it alone / but that's not me"). To this end, he decides to leave both his home and his lover ("I once had a dream so I packed up and split for the city"). He contemplates being successful and great "in the eyes of the world", however, he feels that it may be more meaningful to do it for the sake of "just one girl". His parents notice that he is acting out of character, possibly before he does ("My folks when I wrote and told them what I was up to said 'that's not me'").

As the narrator reflects on his past, he begins to understand that his personal development has not reached its full potential ("I went through all kinds of changes, took a look at myself, and said that's not me"). Ultimately, he realizes that he is better living with a lover than pursuing a life of solitude in service to his dream ("I soon found out that my lonely life wasn't so pretty"). He then begs his lover for forgiveness after having abandoned her "at the wrong time", although he is grateful that he did, for now he is "that much more sure that we're ready".

In a 1976 interview, Wilson stated, "I think "That's Not Me" reveals a lot about myself, just the idea that you're going to look at yourself and say, 'Hey, now look, that's not me, kind of square off with yourself and say 'this is me, that's not me'." Asher expressed dissatisfaction with the lyrics for the song, describing them as "labored", and lamented that he had "missed the mark". He said, "This is all a criticism of my lyric-writing, by the way; it's a very interesting series of chord changes. It goes in wonderful places that you don't expect it to. But for some reason, I found it very difficult to write to."

Music historian Jim DeRogatis states that the song was written after Wilson, influenced by psychedelic drugs, had been inspired to turn his attention inward and probe "his deep-seated self-doubts". According to biographer Timothy White, the song was written about Wilson's feelings about his withdrawal from the group's regular touring line-up after December 1964.

== Composition ==
=== Harmonic structure ===
"That's Not Me" is the only track on Pet Sounds with an ABAB form, with every instance of AB being repeated with development. It starts in the key of A major, ascends up a major sixth to F♯ major, briefly modulates to G major, and finally ends back in F♯. Musicologist Philip Lambert felt that "the move from A to F♯ major symbolizes the narrator's journey away from home to gain a new perspective". Fusilli describes the song as "subversive" and an "avant-garde piece of pop music" partly for these key modulations.

Musicologist James E. Perone observed a melodic "sighing" motif in "That's Not Me" that recurs throughout Pet Sounds, including the preceding track "You Still Believe in Me" and the track which follows, "Don't Talk (Put Your Head on My Shoulder)". Perone explains,

["That's Not Me"] includes the Wilson sigh motive [sic] at the conclusion of each line of the verses. Here, the lead character, this time sung by Mike Love, defines his identity more in terms of what he is rather than who he is. Although this ultimately defines the character, the technique that Asher employs in his lyrics and Wilson's insistent use of the sigh falloff can give the listener the impression that the character's sense of self-identity is weaker than he might admit.

=== Arrangement ===
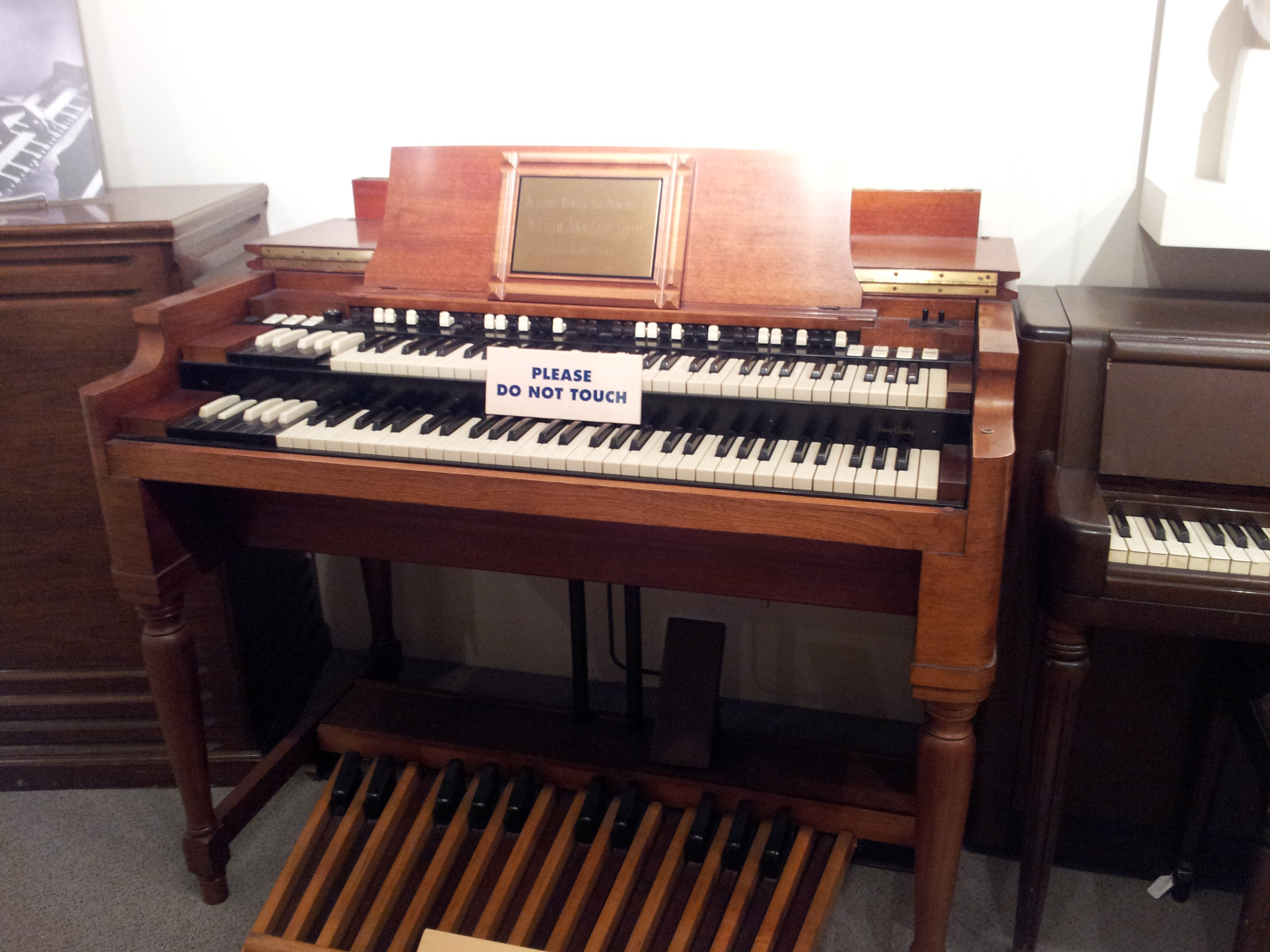
A Hammond organ provides much of the sonic texture in "That's Not Me"

In comparison to the other tracks on Pet Sounds, "That's Not Me" has a relatively small-scale instrumental arrangement. Critic Stewart Mason considered the track to be "the closest thing to a conventional rocker" on Pet Sounds. Dennis Wilson, whose drumming contributions on the album were limited to "That's Not Me", stated in a 1967 interview, "If you listen closely to the Pet Sounds album, you'll hear me playing jazz patterns. Some of the things definitely aren't rock and roll." Starting at 0:17, the pattern engages in extended tom drum rolls, which are rarely used in popular music.

Music historian Charles Granata compares the music of "That's Not Me" to "the spacious atmosphere" heard in Aaron Copland's Billy the Kid and Rodeo ballets; moreover, the "uncluttered arrangement (featuring guitar, organ, bass, and percussion) allows each instrument to breathe, making the tune a study in contrast and texture." Mason supports, "The start-stop quality of the tune -- a trick that Brian Wilson used quite a bit during this period of his career -- gives the song a sense of nervous tension that's exacerbated by the beaten-down, anxious quality of Tony Asher's lyrics." As written in the Student's Guide to Music Tech,

"That's Not Me" is another example [re: "Wouldn't it Be Nice"] of the way in which the Beach Boys (or more properly, Brian Wilson) use texture to reflect changes of mood. Listen to the way the texture changes for the sections beginning "I'm a little bit scared" and "I once had a dream". The strong percussive elements drop out to leave a smooth, sustained organ and vocal texture with a heavily reverbed guitar. This song has no intro, but notice how unusual harmonic twists give variety to what might otherwise be a rather repetitive verse structure.

Bruce Johnston remembered of the vocal arrangement, "That's just an 'ooh and aah' song vocally. That was easy; a gymnastic experience. I'm pretty rangy in my voice. But that was really a song for a lead vocal."

== Recording ==
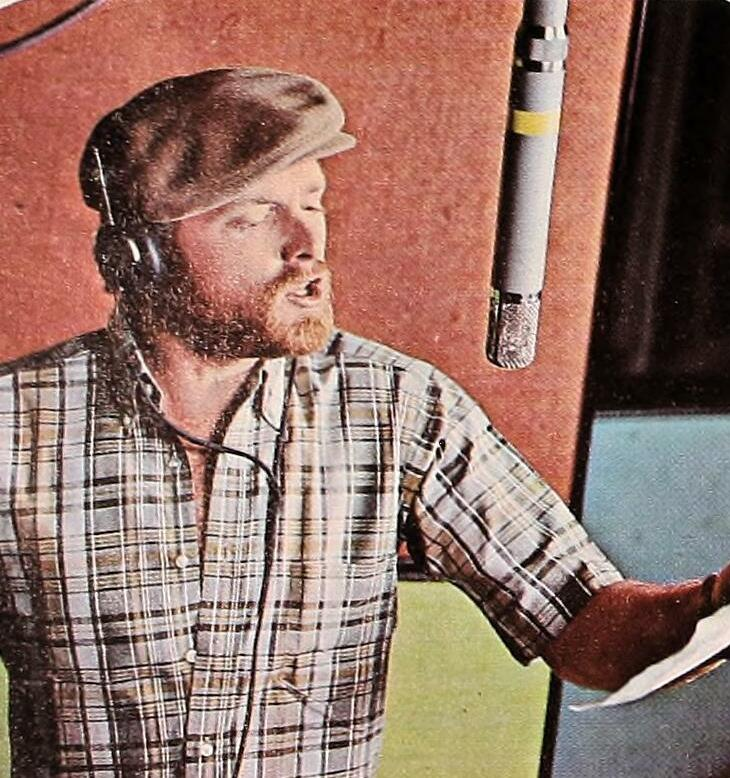
Mike Love (pictured 1966) sang lead on "That's Not Me"

Wilson produced "That's Not Me" in February 1966 at Western Studio in Hollywood. The basic track was recorded on February 15, with Brian on organ, Dennis on drums, Carl on lead guitar, and Terry Melcher on tambourine. Bruce Johnston recounted an anecdote concerning this session:

I distinctly remember that Terry Melcher played tambourine on that song. Not long ago, he and I were listening to Pet Sounds, and he said, "Gosh—this is such a great track, but the timing on the tambourine is off!" I said, "Uh-hum. Terry, that's you!" He didn't remember it, but Terry Melcher is on the Pet Sounds album.

The track was then mixed down to allow Brian and Carl to overdub a bass guitar and 12-string guitar, respectively. After another reduction mix, they overdubbed another bass and 12-string guitar part. "That's Not Me" is the only track on the album where most of the instrumentation was played by the band members themselves. It is also the only track on the album where Brian and Carl perform together on instruments, and the only track where more than two members of the group play their own instruments.

Additional percussion and vocals were overdubbed shortly thereafter. The lead vocal was sung by Mike Love with Brian Wilson. Wilson stated in 1996, "He just really nailed it, real powerful voice, very souped-up kind of a sound." When the track was remixed for stereo in 1996, Wilson asked for the "clack" sound in the bridge to be reduced in volume.

== Critical reception ==
On May 16, 1966, "That's Not Me" was released as the third track on Pet Sounds. In his self-described "unbiased" review of the album for Record Mirror, Norman Jopling described the song as a "quizzical sort of beat ballad [with a] self-obsessed sort of lyric which is clever without being in the least appealing ... Spectorish at times."

In his 2003 book about Pet Sounds, Charles Granata writes, "While not as popular as some of the other Pet Sounds songs, its sparse orchestration and uncommon form [makes] 'That's Not Me' one of the most appealing on the record." AllMusic reviewer Stewart Mason decreed that "That's Not Me" was "a largely underappreciated gem" that had been "[o]vershadowed by the even-better tracks that surround it on side one of Pet Sounds".

== Personnel ==
Per archivists John Brode, Will Crerar, Joshilyn Hoisington, and Craig Slowinski.

The Beach Boys

- Al Jardine – backing vocals
- Bruce Johnston – backing vocals
- Mike Love – lead vocal (verses and chorus), backing vocals
- Brian Wilson – lead vocal (chorus), backing vocals, Hammond C-3 organ, overdubbed Fender Precision and Fender VI bass, handclapping; producer
- Carl Wilson – backing vocals, Fender Stratocaster electric guitar, overdubbed Rickenbacker twelve-string lead guitar, wood knocking or handclapping
- Dennis Wilson – backing vocals, floor tom, wood knocking or handclapping

Additional players

- Terry Melcher – tambourine, handclapping

Technical staff

- Chuck Britz – engineer

The American Federation of Musicians (AFM) sheets indicate the presence of Jardine and Johnston, but they did not contribute to the recording of the basic track.

== Cover versions ==
- 2012 – The Sand Band, MOJO Presents Pet Sounds Revisited
- 2016 – Holy Wave, A Tribute to Pet Sounds

== Bibliography ==
- DeRogatis, Jim (2003). Turn on Your Mind: Four Decades of Great Psychedelic Rock. Hal Leonard Corporation. ISBN 978-0-634-05548-5.
- Everett, Walter (2009). The Foundations of Rock. Oxford, England: Oxford University Press. ISBN 978-0-19-531023-8.
- Fusilli, Jim (2005). Beach Boys' Pet Sounds. Bloomsbury Publishing. ISBN 978-1-4411-1266-8.
- Gaines, Steven (1986). Heroes and Villains: The True Story of The Beach Boys. New York: Da Capo Press. ISBN 0306806479.
- Granata, Charles L. (2003). Wouldn't It Be Nice: Brian Wilson and the Making of the Beach Boys' Pet Sounds. A Cappella Books. ISBN 9781556525070.
- Lambert, Philip (2007). Inside the Music of Brian Wilson: The Songs, Sounds, and Influences of the Beach Boys' Founding Genius. Bloomsbury Publishing. ISBN 978-1-4411-0748-0.
- Lambert, Philip (March 2008). "Brian Wilson's Pet Sounds". Twentieth-Century Music. 5 (1). Cambridge University Press: 109–133. doi:10.1017/S1478572208000625. S2CID 162871617.
- O'Regan, Jade Simone (2014). When I Grow Up: The Development of the Beach Boys' Sound (1962-1966) (PDF) (Thesis). Queensland Conservatorium. doi:10.25904/1912/2556.
- O'Regan, Jadey (2016). "When I Grow Up". In Lambert, Philip (ed.). Good Vibrations: Brian Wilson and the Beach Boys in Critical Perspective. University of Michigan Press. ISBN 978-0-472-11995-0.
- Perone, James E. (2012). The Album: A Guide to Pop Music's Most Provocative, Influential, and Important Creations. ABC-CLIO. ISBN 978-0-313-37907-9.
- White, Timothy (1996). The Nearest Faraway Place: Brian Wilson, the Beach Boys, and the Southern Californian Experience. Macmillan. ISBN 0333649370.
