= Bruce & Terry =

American 1960s rock music duo

- Johnston (left) and Melcher, c. 1965

Background information
- Origin: Los Angeles, California, U.S.
- Genres: Vocal surf
- Years active: 1963–1965
- Labels: Columbia
- Past members: Bruce Johnston; Terry Melcher

Bruce & Terry was an American rock music duo from Los Angeles that was active from 1963 to 1965. Consisting of Columbia Records staff producers Bruce Johnston and Terry Melcher, the pair recorded under a variety of names, and most notably with the band the Rip Chords. After 1965, Johnston and Melcher reduced their collaborations together, but both producers continued to occasionally contribute to tracks by the Beach Boys, including on the albums Pet Sounds (1966), Still Cruisin' (1989), and Summer in Paradise (1992).

== History ==
Johnston was a session musician and Melcher had a minor solo career as "Terry Day" before becoming the youngest staff record producer in Columbia Records' history. In 1963, they began recording together and helped produce the album Surfin' Round the World.

While producing a "surf-frat" band called the Rip Chords, whose "Here I Stand" had reached No. 51 in early 1963, they ended up vocal arranging and singing all of the vocal parts on the band's hit "Hey Little Cobra" in 1964. The song was the first in a series of hit singles (most of which were released under the name Bruce & Terry), reaching No. 4 on the U.S. pop charts.

The duo virtually disbanded when Johnston joined The Beach Boys, singing on Pet Sounds and performing with them well into the 21st century, while Melcher became a full-time producer. The two occasionally worked on projects together until Melcher died at 62, after a long battle with melanoma, on November 19, 2004.

== Discography ==
Bruce & Terry singles

- "Custom Machine" / "Makaha at Midnight" (Columbia 4-42956, 1964) – No. 85 US
- "Summer Means Fun" / "Yeah!" (Columbia 4-43055, 1964) – No. 72 US
- "I Love You Model 'T'" / "Carmen" (Columbia 4-43238, 1965) -- No. 107 US
- "Raining in My Heart" / "Four Strong Winds" (Columbia 4-43378, 1965)
- "Thank You, Baby" / "Come Love" (Columbia 4-43479)
- "Girl, It's Alright Now" / "Don't Run Away" (Columbia 4-43582, 1966)
- "Take It To Mexico (Tulsa County Blue)" / "Rebecca" (RCA Victor NB-10238, 1975)

Bruce & Terry albums

- Rare Masters (M&M MMCD 1001, 1992)
- The Best of Bruce & Terry (Sundazed SC 11052, 1998)

Rip Chords singles featuring both Bruce and Terry

- 1962–63: "Here I Stand" (Bringas on lead vocal) backed with "Karen" (Stewart on lead) Billboard #51.
- 1963: "Gone" (Bringas on lead) b/w "She Thinks I Still Care" (Bringas on lead) Billboard #88.
- 1963–64: "Hey Little Cobra" (Melcher on lead) b/w "The Queen" (Melcher on lead) Billboard #4.
- 1964: "Three Window Coupe" (Melcher on lead) b/w "Hot Rod U.S.A." (Melcher on lead) Billboard #28.
- 1964: "One Piece Topless Bathing Suit" (Melcher and Bringas on lead) b/w "Wah-Wahini" (Melcher on lead) Billboard #96.
- 1965: "Don't Be Scared" (Melcher on lead) b/w "Bunny Hill" (instrumental by The Wrecking Crew)

Other albums featuring both Bruce and Terry

- Surfin' 'Round the World (1963) (Bruce Johnston solo album)
- Hey Little Cobra and Other Hot Rod Hits (Columbia, February 1964) #56. Billboard Album Chart. (Rip Chords album)
- Three Window Coupe (Columbia, September 1964) (Rip Chords album)
- Pet Sounds (Capitol, 16th May 1966) (Beach Boys album)
- The Beach Boys (Caribou, 10th June 1985) (Beach Boys album)
- Still Cruisin' (Capitol, 28th August 1989) (Beach Boys album)
- Summer in Paradise (Brother, 3rd August 1992) (Beach Boys album)
- Summer U.S.A.! The Best of the Rip Chords (Sundazed, 27th June 2006) (Rip Chords album)
