= Still Cruisin' (song) =

Single by the Beach Boys

from the album Still Cruisin'
- B-side: "Kokomo"
- Released: July 7, 1989
- Recorded: 1988
- Genre: Pop rock
- Length: 3:35
- Label: Capitol
- Songwriters: Mike Love; Terry Melcher
- Producer: Terry Melcher

The Beach Boys singles chronology
"Kokomo" (1988)	"Still Cruisin'" (1989)	"Somewhere Near Japan" (1990)

"Still Cruisin'" is a song written by Mike Love and Terry Melcher for the American rock band the Beach Boys. It was released on their 1989 album Still Cruisin' and reached No. 11 in Austria, No. 28 in Australia, and No. 93 on the Billboard Hot 100.

== Recording ==
The song includes the vocals of Carl Wilson, Mike Love, Al Jardine, and Bruce Johnston. The only then-active Beach Boys member not included in the recording was Brian Wilson. The main recording was done at Al Jardine's Red Barn Studios in Big Sur, California. The guitars, bass & solo were played by Los Angeles studio musician, Craig Trippan Fall. The programming, including drums/keyboards were done by Keith Wechsler, who also was the engineer on the Still Cruisin' album, and the Summer in Paradise album.

== Promotional video ==
VH-1 participated in the development of the promotional video for "Still Cruisin'" to help promote a Chevrolet Corvette giveaway for their then-young cable channel. The video included four members of the Beach Boys singing the song at a concert with cutaways to several versions of the Corvette. Although Brian Wilson did not participate in the "Still Cruisin'" recording sessions, he did make a brief cameo appearance in the video driving in his Corvette in silhouette during part of the intro, and during the lyrics "...paradise by the sea," Brian is sitting on the oceanside and turns to the camera. These shots, alongside additional shots of Brian in his house playing the keyboard, were also intended to be part of a music video for "In My Car", also from the same album and also intended for Chevrolet promotion, which was ultimately scrapped for "Still Cruisin'".

== Personnel ==
The Beach Boys

- Mike Love – vocals
- Al Jardine – vocals
- Carl Wilson – vocals
- Bruce Johnston – vocals

Additional musicians

- Craig Trippan Fall – guitars, bass guitar
- Keith Wechsler – drums, keyboards

== Live versions ==
The song briefly appeared in set lists during The Beach Boys' 50th Anniversary Reunion Tour. During performances, Al Jardine took over on Carl's co-lead vocals.

The song was dropped early on during the reunion tour. "Still Crusin'" did not appear on the band's 2013 live album.

== Chart positions ==
Chart	Peak position
Australian Singles Chart	28
Austrian Singles Chart	11
Canada Top Singles	55
Canada RPM Adult Contemporary	7
German Singles Chart	51
UK Singles	78
US Billboard Hot 100	93
US Billboard Adult Contemporary	9
US Gavin Report Adult Contemporary	4
US Radio & Records Adult Contemporary	5
