= Somewhere Near Japan =

Single by the Beach Boys

from the album Still Cruisin'
- B-side: "Kokomo"
- Released: January 11, 1990
- Recorded: 1989
- Genre: Jangle pop
- Length: 4:49 (album version); 4:14 (single version)
- Label: Capitol
- Songwriters: John Phillips; Terry Melcher; Mike Love; Bruce Johnston
- Producer: Terry Melcher

The Beach Boys singles chronology
"Still Cruisin'" (1989)	"Somewhere Near Japan" (1990)	"Problem Child" (1990)

"Somewhere Near Japan" is a song written for the American rock band the Beach Boys. It was released on January 11, 1990 as the third single from their 1989 album Still Cruisin'.

== Backstory ==
The bulk of the song was written by John Phillips and concerns his daughter Mackenzie Phillips' honeymoon experiences. She and her new husband, both serious substance abusers, flew to Guam and when the money and drugs ran out, she made a late-night phone call to her father begging him to send money or drugs, preferably both; when he asked where she was, the reply was "somewhere near Japan". Phillips' original version of the song, titled "Fairy Tale Girl," allegedly ran to over 25 verses. A late-1980s recording by the New Mamas & the Papas (John Phillips, Mackenzie Phillips, Scott McKenzie, and Spanky McFarlane) under the title "Fairy Tale Girl (Somewhere Near Japan)" was belatedly released on the 2010 compilation Many Mamas, Many Papas from Varèse Sarabande.

The final Beach Boys release describes a protagonist agreeing to come to the rescue of his "fairy tale girl" who is "driftin' on some Chinese junk," a double entendre for both heroin and a type of ship, despite the likelihood that she will "break [his] heart one more time"—concluding that "I broke her fall and I always will."

== Recording ==
"Somewhere Near Japan" features the lead vocals of Mike Love, Carl Wilson, Al Jardine and Bruce Johnston. Brian Wilson was not included in the recording of the song, as he was involved with Dr. Eugene Landy at the time of recording and was not actively participating in many Beach Boys projects. He did, however, appear in the music video. The single release is a remix of the album recording. The 12-string guitars, mandolin & solo were played by Los Angeles studio musician, Craig T. Fall. The main recording was done at Al Jardine's Red Barn Studios in Big Sur, California. The programming, including drums and keyboards were done by Keith Wechsler, who also was the engineer on the albums Still Cruisin' and Summer in Paradise. The song was produced by Terry Melcher, who co-wrote the song and helped arrange the backing vocals.

== Music video ==
The music video features Brian Wilson, Carl Wilson, Al Jardine, Bruce Johnston and Mike Love. In the closing moments, all five band members are featured together for the first time since the video for "California Dreamin'" in 1986. The video was produced by Paul Flattery, directed by Jim Yukich of Flattery Yukich Inc., and filmed on a sound stage in Tampa, Florida.

== Charts ==
Chart	Peak position
US Gavin Report Adult Contemporary	34

== Personnel ==
- Mike Love – lead vocals
- Carl Wilson – lead vocals
- Al Jardine – lead vocals
- Bruce Johnston – lead vocals, keyboards, bass
- Craig Trippand Fall – lead guitar, mandolin
- Keith Wechsler – drums, keyboards, programming
- Terry Melcher – backing vocals
