= California sound =

Popular music aesthetic originating in the early 1960s

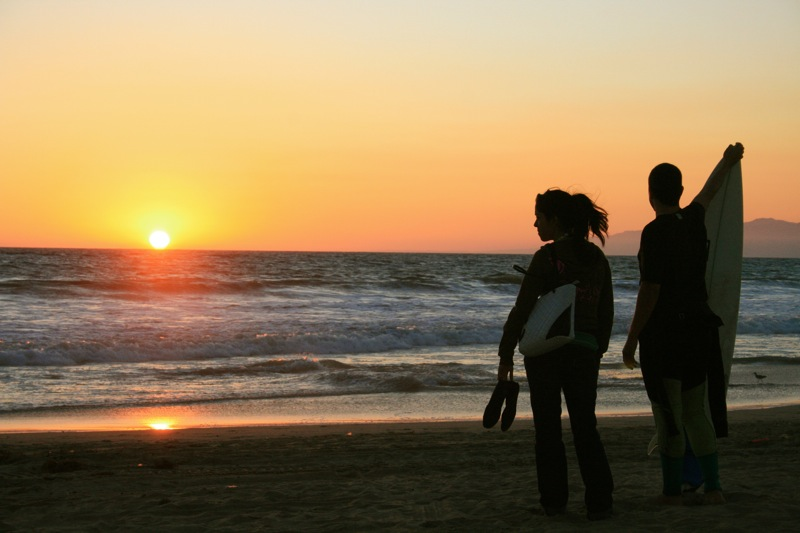
A young couple watching the sunset on Venice Beach with surfboard in hand

The California sound is a popular music aesthetic (Note: A genre according to Michael Roffman and a lifestyle according to Jillian Mapes.) that originates with American pop and rock recording artists from Southern California in the early 1960s. At first, it was conflated with the California myth, an idyllic setting inspired by the state's beach culture that commonly appeared in the lyrics of commercial pop songs. Later, the sound was expanded outside its initial geography and subject matter and was developed to be more sophisticated, often featuring studio experimentation.

The sound was originally identified for harnessing a wide-eyed, sunny optimism attributed to Southern California teenage life in the 1960s. Its imagery is primarily represented by Brian Wilson and the Beach Boys, who are credited for the sound's instigation via their debut single "Surfin'" in 1961. Along with Jan and Dean, the Beach Boys encapsulated surfing, hot rod culture, and youthful innocence within music which transformed a local lifestyle into American mythology. Other proponents included songwriters and/or record producers Gary Usher, Curt Boettcher, Bruce Johnston, Terry Melcher, and Roger Christian.

The California sound gradually evolved to reflect a more musically ambitious and mature worldview, becoming less to do with surfing and cars and more about social consciousness and political awareness. Between 1964 and 1969, it fueled innovation and transition, inspiring artists to tackle largely unmentioned themes such as sexual freedom, black pride, drugs, oppositional politics, other countercultural motifs, and war. It helped launch the 1960s folk-rock scene, represented by groups such as the Byrds, the Mamas and the Papas, Buffalo Springfield, and Crosby, Stills, & Nash, who became associated with the Los Angeles neighborhood of Laurel Canyon. The California sound eventually saw its commercial peak in the 1970s hits of the Eagles. A derivative form of the California sound was later classified as sunshine pop.

== Origins ==
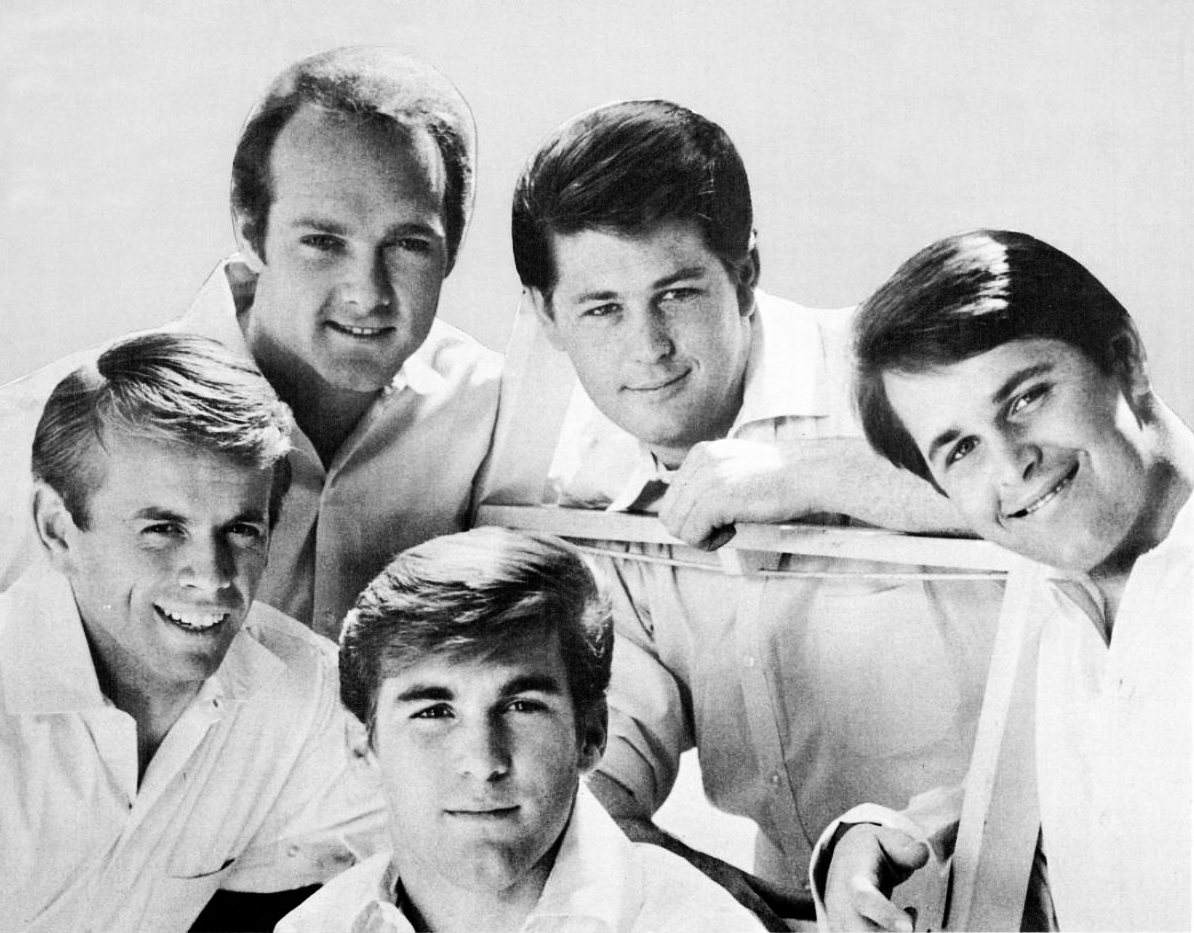
The Beach Boys in a promotional shot used for their 1964 single "I Get Around"

The Beach Boys – "Surfin' U.S.A."
Author Luis Sanchez writes: "If Surfin' U.S.A. [the album] didn't literally transform America into an endless beach, it added vivid dimension to California mythos and took it further than anyone would have thought."

The genesis of the California sound is said to be the Beach Boys' debut single "Surfin'" in 1961. While the band's leader Brian Wilson then collaborated with Jan Berry for several hit singles written and produced for other artists, they recorded what would later be regarded as the California sound. University of Southern California history professor Kevin Starr has stated that the band was historically important for embodying the era of the Silent Generation, which he described as unpolitical. He explained that the group "could not help but mythologize a landscape and way of life that was already so surreal, so proto-mythic, in its setting. Cars and the beach, surfing, the California Girl, all this fused in the alembic of youth: Here was a way of life, an iconography, already half-released into the chords and multiple tracks of a new sound." The California sound was thus a musical translation of the California myth. In the book Pioneers of Rock and Roll: 100 Artists Who Changed the Face of Rock, Harry Sumrall summarized:

[The Beach Boys] virtually defined the image of surfers, hot rods, sun, beaches, girls, and fun, fun, fun that became the California myth. The titles of their songs said it as well as anything: "Surfin' U.S.A.," "Little Deuce Coupe," "Surfer Girl," "Fun, Fun, Fun," "Dance, Dance, Dance," and "California Girls". With these hits and others, the group's bassist and songwriter, Brian Wilson, created a new sound in rock and roll. It was called the "surf sound", but in fact it was a combination of older rock verities set in entirely new lyrical and musical contexts.

The Beach Boys' surf music was not entirely of their own invention, being preceded by artists such as Dick Dale. However, previous surf musicians did not project a worldview as the Beach Boys did. Wilson once said of its myth: "It's not just the surfing; it's the outdoors and cars and sunshine; it's the society of California; it's the way of California." Al Jardine of the Beach Boys argued that "It's not entirely a myth. There are still some elements that are certainly true, especially for a first-time observer. But to be able to come here and to drive that coast on Route 1 ... you experience the water and the animals and the sea life, the whole thing. It's really magical. It really is." Capitol Records staff producer Nick Venet, who worked with the group early on, believed that most of the group's lyrical inspiration was drawn from Hollywood films.

AllMusic's review of the group's "All Summer Long" calls it a "potent example" of the California myth's "idyllic dream world of sun, surf, and fun" while containing qualities of sunshine pop. Author Luis Sanchez believes that the entirety of the album All Summer Long (1964) was "the nearest the Beach Boys ever got to a perfect version of the California myth." David Howard wrote that "Don't Worry Baby" was a "subtle harbinger for the growing dichotomy within the California sound. While 'I Get Around' symbolized the sunshine ideal in all its carefree splendor, 'Don't Worry Baby' suggested something entirely more pensive and even slightly dark underneath its pristine facade."

== Cultural expansion ==
The Beach Boys continued expanding their version of the California myth until it could no longer be confined to pop music terrain, transcending the limits of genre, commercial expectations, and geography. Aiding this was Wilson's successes with collaborator Gary Usher. The duo helped create a major new market revolving around the California sound, allowing musicians Bruce Johnston (who would later join the Beach Boys) and Terry Melcher to turn their attention to the Rip Chords, a group who then had hits with the hot-rod themed "Hey Little Cobra" and pseudo-surf "Summer Means Fun". Historian Matthew Allan Ides wrote:

The writing duo of [Gary] Usher and [Roger] Christian, like that of Terry Melcher and Bruce Johnston, provided most of the lyrics, production and promotion to the vocal pop music that like instrumental surf music became associated with Southern California youth culture. Ironically, both Usher and Christian had come to California from the East Coast in the late 1950s, and neither had much experience with surfing or local youth. Nonetheless, Usher and Christian translated their impressions of teen life in Southern California into lyrics. Usher’s songs included "In My Room" and "The Lonely Surfer" and Christian’s hits numbered "Surf City", "Little Old Lady from Pasadena" and "Don’t Worry Baby".

Historian Kirse Granat May describes the cultural reverberation of both surfing culture and the California sound:

By 1965, with the help of the California sound, the national diffusion of the surfing subculture was complete. It became a mainstream advertising image, keyed into California's youthfulness as "an element of the marketing picture." Pepsi used images of surfers and this pun, "Board Members of the Pepsi Generation". ... Surfing appeared on television sitcoms like Gidget and even entered the plots of shows like Dr. Kildare. ... In the wake of the surfing craze and the emergence of the California sound, American International Pictures (AIP) produced beach and surfing movies for appreciative teenage audiences, reinforcing marketable images. ... the Beach Party films exploited on the big screen what the Beach Boys set to music.

Touching specifically on the difference between the Beach Boys' album Surfin' U.S.A. (1963) and others' exploitation of California themes, Luis Sanchez writes: "You could call The Beach Boys' version of Southern California cutesy or callow or whatever, but what matters is that it captured a lack of self-consciousness—a genuineness—that set them apart from their peers. And it was this quality that came to define Brian's oeuvre as he moved beyond and into bigger pop productions that would culminate in Smile."

== Development and decline ==
The Mamas & the Papas – "California Dreamin'"
The Mamas & the Papas' 1965 single "California Dreamin'" supplemented the California myth.

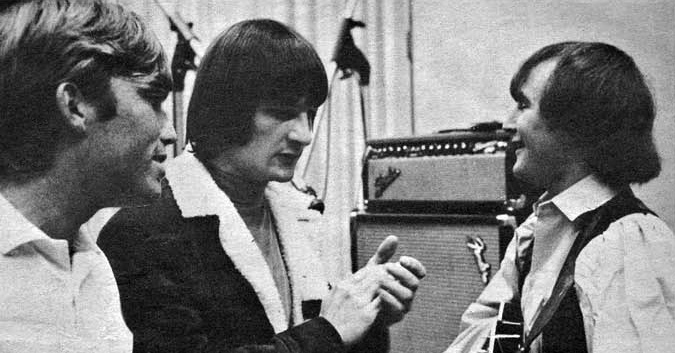
Terry Melcher (left) with the Byrds' Gene Clark and David Crosby

The California sound soon developed to incorporate the 1960s folk-rock innovations of the Byrds and the Mamas and the Papas. Melcher soon worked with the Byrds, producing their 1965 folk rock single "Mr. Tambourine Man". Its recording was based on Brian Wilson's production approach to "Don't Worry Baby". Melcher's "commercially golden formula" with the Byrds was immediately co-opted by many Los Angeles–based recording artists such as the Turtles, the Leaves, Sonny & Cher, and Barry McGuire. Buffalo Springfield also helped to pioneer the California sound, begetting Crosby, Stills, & Nash and influencing the Eagles. The lyricism behind the California sound gradually became less to do with surfing and cars and more about social consciousness and political awareness. In Bill Flanagan's view, after the Beach Boys epitomized the California sound, Crosby, Stills, & Nash "ratified it". Arnold Shaw summarized in The Rock Revolution (1969):

The California sound went from one extreme to another—from "Be true to your school!" to "Let's freak out!", from the Surf Sound to fuzztone and feedback, from celebration of the open road to a search for strange inner experiences, from the thrill of speed to liberation through sensory overload, from the excitement of bodily motion to the explosiveness of mind-expanding drugs, and from the Beach Boys to the Mothers of Invention—a process in which the Boys themselves underwent an audible, if not visible, transformation.

The result of Wilson's increasingly artistic interpretations of pop music form helped transform the California sound into a more musically ambitious and mature worldview. In September 1965, Wilson was quoted saying: "I HATE so-called 'surfin' music.' It's a name that people slap on any sound from California. Our music is rightfully 'the Beach Boy sound'—if one has to label it." By 1966, Wilson had already begun moving away from the supposed lightweight themes that had established his group's image, expressing a willingness to "get out of the Eisenhower mindset" as told by collaborator Van Dyke Parks. Meanwhile, Gary Usher was enlisted by the Byrds to helm their transitional 1967 release Younger Than Yesterday which incorporated folk rock, jazz-influenced pop, novelty space rock, and colorful psychedelia. According to the Irish Mirror, singer-songwriter David Crosby, a founding member of both the Byrds and later Crosby, Stills, & Nash, helped shape the California sound which became popular in the 1970s.

In Howard's description, "One can view the evolution of the California Sunshine Sound as a mirror of the evolution of the 1960s. Commencing with its post-Eisenhower narrative and insulated complacency, the early California sound was predicated on Wilson, Usher, and Melcher's simple fun-in-the-sun ideals." It ran into decline by the end of the 1960s due to the West Coast's cultural shifts occurring in tandem with the psychological descent of Wilson and Melcher's associations with the Manson murders, with Howard calling it the "sunset of the original California Sunshine Sound ... [the] sweetness advocated by the California myth had led to chilling darkness and unsightly rot".

== 1970s and revivals ==
According to Flanagan, by the 1970s, the "spirit" of the California sound was kept fresh by singer–songwriters such as Lowell George, Jackson Browne, Tom Waits and Rickie Lee Jones while avoiding what Flanagan called the sound's "clichés". The Providence Journal credited the Eagles, formed in Los Angeles in the early 1970s, with "embodying the melodic California sound" that decade. Robbie Woliver of The New York Times stated that Eagles co-founder Don Henley "defined the California sound of the 1970s." According to Uncut, their country-rock debut album Eagles (1972) helped define the Southern California sound of the early 1970s.

In November 2009, Pitchfork ran an editorial feature which mentioned the Beach Boys as a "looming figure" throughout that summer's indie music scene termed the "Summer of Chillwave" elaborating that it is "not to say that any of this music sounds like the Beach Boys, or even tries to. ... The Beach Boys exist in this music in an abstracted form-- an idea, rather than a sound, as it's often been ... Summertime now is about disorientation: 'Should Have Taken Acid With You'; 'The Sun Was High (And So Am I)'; You take the fantasy of [their] music-- the cars, the sand, the surf-- add a dollop of melancholy and a smudge of druggy haze, and you have some good music for being alone in a room with only a computer to keep you company." Paste magazine credited a 2010s revival of surf rock and the California sound to the success of bands such as Best Coast, Dum Dum Girls and Wavves.

== Genres ==
=== Surf music ===
The California sound is sometimes referred to interchangeably with surf music.

=== Folk rock ===
California folk rockers included the Byrds, Barry McGuire, and the Mamas & the Papas.

=== Sunshine pop ===
Efforts by Curt Boettcher in 1966 created an offshoot of the California sound directed toward sunshine pop.

== Other California sounds ==
Some areas within the state of California are connected to their own distinguished "sounds" including the San Francisco sound (San Francisco, 1960s) and the Bakersfield sound (Bakersfield, 1950s). Ides noted: "The Los Angeles sound as popularized in the mainstream obscured or disregarded the contributions made by the working-class, the nonwhite and women."

In a Flavorwire article which asks "What is the quintessential California sound?", the journal lists 30 of what it considers "the most Californian albums ever made", elaborating that "the sound itself is important, but it's the lifestyles behind these scenes that come to define the music." In alphabetical order, the artists mentioned are: Crosby, Stills, Nash & Young, Dead Kennedys, Fleetwood Mac, Germs, Green Day, Guns N' Roses, Jefferson Airplane, Joni Mitchell, Kendrick Lamar, Love, Mötley Crüe, N.W.A, No Doubt, Queens of the Stone Age, Red Hot Chili Peppers, Sly and the Family Stone, Snoop Dogg, the Beach Boys, the Doors, the Go-Go's, the Grateful Dead, the Offspring, Tupac Shakur, and X.

== Sources ==
- Bisbort, Alan; Puterbaugh, Parke (2009). California Beaches: The Best Places to Swim, Play, Eat, and Stay. Avalon Travel. ISBN 978-1-56691-614-1.
- Browne, Ray Broadus; Browne, Glenn J. (1986). Laws of Our Fathers: Popular Culture and the U.S. Constitution. Popular Press. ISBN 978-0-87972-338-5.
- Gilliland, John (1969). "UNT Digital Library" (audio). Pop Chronicles. University of North Texas Libraries.
- Flanagan, Bill (2010). Written in My Soul: Conversations with Rock's Great Songwriters. Rosetta Books. ISBN 978-0-7953-1081-2.
- Goggans, Jan; Difranco, Aaron (2004). The Pacific Region: The Greenwood Encyclopedia of American Regional Cultures. Abc-Clio. ISBN 978-0-313-08505-5.
- Howard, David N. (2004). Sonic Alchemy: Visionary Music Producers and Their Maverick Recordings. Hal Leonard Corporation. ISBN 978-0-634-05560-7.
- Ides, Matthew Allan (2009). Cruising for Community: Youth Culture and Politics in Los Angeles, 1910–1970 (PDF). University of Michigan. ISBN 978-1-109-11538-3.
- Massey, Howard (2000). Behind the Glass. Hal Leonard Corporation. ISBN 978-1-61774-479-2.
- May, Kirse Granat (2002). Golden State, Golden Youth: The California Image in Popular Culture, 1955-1966. Univ of North Carolina Press. ISBN 978-0-8078-5362-7.
- Miller, Jim (1992). "The Beach Boys". In DeCurtis, Anthony; Henke, James; George-Warren, Holly (eds.). The Rolling Stone Illustrated History of Rock & Roll: The Definitive History of the Most Important Artists and Their Music. New York: Random House. ISBN 9780679737285.
- Priore, Domenic (2005). Smile: The Story of Brian Wilson's Lost Masterpiece. London: Sanctuary. ISBN 1860746276.
- Sanchez, Luis (2014). The Beach Boys' Smile. Bloomsbury Publishing. ISBN 978-1-62356-956-3.
- Shaw, Arnold (1969). The Rock Revolution: What's Happening to Today's Music. New York: Crowell-Collier Press.
- Shuker, Roy (1994). Understanding Popular Music. Psychology Press. ISBN 978-0-415-10722-8.
- Starr, Kevin (2009). Golden Dreams: California in an Age of Abundance, 1950-1963. Oxford University Press. ISBN 978-0-19-515377-4.
- Sumrall, Harry (1994). Pioneers of Rock and Roll: 100 Artists Who Changed the Face of Rock. Billboard Books. ISBN 978-0-8230-7628-4.
