= Problem Child (The Beach Boys song) =

Single by the Beach Boys
- B-side: "Problem Child (Instrumental)"
- Released: July 23, 1990
- Length: 3:39
- Label: RCA
- Songwriter: Terry Melcher
- Producer: Terry Melcher

The Beach Boys singles chronology
"Somewhere Near Japan" (1990)	"Problem Child" (1990)	"Hot Fun in the Summertime'" (1992)

"Problem Child" is a song by American rock band the Beach Boys that was written and produced by Terry Melcher. It was released as a cassette single on July 23, 1990, in conjunction with the motion picture of the same name.

== Music video ==
The music video depicts the band performing the song in a recording studio, complete with clips from the film shown on an overhead monitor in front of them. Two of the film's cast members appear in the video; Gilbert Gottfried as Mr. Peabody, who oversees the session, and Michael Oliver as Junior, who sneaks into the studio to wreak havoc on the session.

== Reception ==
The A.V. Club wrote: "By 1990, The Beach Boys were more brand than band, animated more by momentum and Mike Love's desire to keep some version of the group going than by any artistic ambition. You can find connections between 'Problem Child' and 'Wouldn't It Be Nice', but you might break something in the attempt."

== Charts ==
Chart	Peak position
US Billboard Adult Contemporary	38
US Gavin Report Adult Contemporary	20

== See also ==
- Nyah nyah nyah nyah nyah nyah (heard during the song's chorus)
