= Going public =

Going public may refer to:

- Initial public offering, financial action by a business
- Whistleblowing, exposure of previously private information
- Going Public (Newsboys album), 1994
- Going Public (Bruce Johnston album), 1977
