= One Summer Night =

Single by The Danleers
- A-side: "Wheelin' and A-Dealin'"
- Released: June 12, 1958
- Genre: Doo-wop; rhythm and blues
- Length: 2:12
- Label: AMP 3; Mercury
- Songwriter(s): Danny Webb
- Producer(s): Bill Lasley; Danny Webb

The Danleers singles chronology
"One Summer Night" (1958)	"I Really Love You / My Flaming Heart" (1958)

"One Summer Night" is a song by American doo-wop group the Danleers. Their one big hit single (and their debut single), "One Summer Night" reached number four on the Billboard Black Singles chart, and number seven on the Best Selling Pop Singles in Stores chart in 1958. The single sold over one million copies.

== Background ==
The song was written by the manager and main songwriter, Danny Webb, and was recorded during their first recording session. The song was first released on the AMP 3 label in May 1958 (erroneously listed as "the Dandleers"), quickly becoming a regional hit. It first began gaining traction in New York. Unable to handle distributing the song, they leased the single to Mercury Records for a national release on June 12, 1958.

The song became a hit once more for Mercury when their group the Diamonds covered the song in 1961.

The Beach Boys released a partial cover of the song on their 1992 album Summer in Paradise as "Slow Summer Dancin' (One Summer Night)". Webb received a writing credit for the sample. Bruce Johnston sings the song and Al Jardine sings the chorus, which covers "One Summer Night".

== Charts ==
The Danleers version

Chart (1958)	Peak position
US Black Singles (The Billboard)	4
US Best Selling Pop Singles in Stores (The Billboard)	7

The Diamonds version

Chart (1961)	Peak position
US Billboard Hot 100	22
