= Still Cruisin' =

Studio album by the Beach Boys
- Released: August 28, 1989
- Recorded: February 27, 1987 – March 9, 1989; Except "I Get Around": April 1964, "Wouldn't It Be Nice": January–April 1966, and "California Girls": April & June 1965
- Studios: 4th Street Recording (Santa Monica); Sound Solutions (Santa Monica); Soundworks (New York City); The Red Barn (Big Sur)
- Genres: Rock; new wave; reggae fusion
- Length: 33:44
- Label: Capitol
- Producers: Terry Melcher; Brian Wilson; Alan Jardine; Tony Moran; Albert Calbrera; Gary Usher

The Beach Boys chronology
Made in U.S.A. (1986)	Still Cruisin' (1989)	Lost & Found (1961–62) (1991)

Singles from Still Cruisin'
- 1. "Kokomo" Released: July 18, 1988; 2. "Still Cruisin'" Released: August 7, 1989; 3. "Somewhere Near Japan" Released: January 11, 1990

Professional ratings
Review scores
Source	Rating
AllMusic	2/5 stars
Blender	1/5 stars
Encyclopedia of Popular Music	1/5 stars
Rolling Stone	1/5 stars

Still Cruisin' is the twenty-sixth studio album by the Beach Boys, their thirty-fifth official album (counting compilations and live packages), and their last release of the 1980s. It is also the last album of new material released during a brief return to Capitol Records.

Released on August 28, 1989, the album was panned by critics, with AllMusic referring to the band's sound by producer Terry Melcher as sounding "like a professional '60s cover band." Despite the poor critical reception, the album was Certified Gold by RIAA in 1989 and has since gone on to be Certified Platinum for sales of 1,000,000 copies.

Despite its commercial success, Still Cruisin' was left out of Capitol's Beach Boys re-issue campaign in 2000 and 2001, along with their following album Summer in Paradise. Its lead single "Kokomo," however, has made subsequent appearances on compilation albums.

== Background ==
After "Kokomo" (when released as a single from the Cocktail film soundtrack) gave the Beach Boys their first number one hit in the US since 1966's "Good Vibrations," the band decided to put together an album of recent and classic songs. The classic songs included had been heard in recent films. The songs "Somewhere Near Japan," "Island Girl," and "Still Cruisin'" were recorded for the album by the touring Beach Boys band as well as studio musicians and producer Terry Melcher. Due to his ongoing relationship with Dr. Eugene Landy, Brian Wilson's lone contribution to this album was "In My Car", a song credited as being co-written by Landy and girlfriend Alexandra Morgan. However, as subsequent court actions have seen Landy's name removed from other period songs, such as those on Wilson's 1988 album, these credits may be negated.

"Kokomo" was a recent single, as was "Wipe Out," a duet with American rap group the Fat Boys. (The song was originally to be recorded with Run-DMC, but Mike Love apparently struck a deal with the other group.) "Make It Big" was recorded for the film Troop Beverly Hills, and the remaining three songs - "I Get Around," "Wouldn't It Be Nice," and "California Girls" – were the "classic" recordings, ones from the group's earlier period, that had been used in recent films. The inclusion of these hits gave the album a more acceptable running time.

At least one song was recorded during or around the time of the sessions for this album but was not included. "Happy Endings" is a ballad which was a collaboration with Little Richard; it was produced by Terry Melcher and was (recorded in June and October 1987 and) released as a non-album single on November 3, 1987. (Its B-side was a live version of "California Girls".) Also not included were "Rock 'n' Roll to the Rescue," "Lady Liberty," and "California Dreamin'" (all of which were released as singles in 1986), along with "The Spirit of Rock and Roll" (recorded between August 1986 and January 1987), a Brian Wilson composition included as the final song in the band's 25th anniversary concert/TV special. "The Spirit of Rock and Roll" was not released. In addition, the 1988 remake of "Don't Worry Baby" from the film Tequila Sunrise with the Everly Brothers was not included.

Mike Love said of the album: "The theme of that album was to have been songs that have been in movies. It was basically a repackage. But then it got watered down with politics, meaning Brian's Dr. Landy forcing a song called "In My Car," which was never in a movie, and a song by [Al] Jardine, which ultimately ended up on the album, called "Island Girl," which was never in a movie either. So to me the concept was a little bit diluted there politically."

Due to the success of "Kokomo," Still Cruisin' went gold in the US and Austria and gave the Beach Boys their best chart showing since 1976. During Capitol's Beach Boys re-issue campaign in 2000 and 2001 however, Still Cruisin' was left behind and allowed to go out of print, and it has remained out of print ever since.

== Singles ==
- "Kokomo" b/w "Tutti Frutti" (Little Richard) (Elektra) July 18, 1988 – US No. 1; UK No. 25
- "Still Cruisin'" b/w "Kokomo" (Capitol) August 7, 1989 – US No. 93
- "Somewhere Near Japan" b/w "Wipe Out" (Capitol) January 11, 1990

== Commercial performance ==
Still Cruisin' reached No. 46 on the US Billboard 200 during a chart stay of 22 weeks. It reached No. 10 in Australia, No. 12 in Austria, No. 25 in Switzerland, and No. 43 in Sweden.

== Track listing ==
Side one
No.	Title	Writer(s)	Lead vocals	Length
1.	"Still Cruisin'" (from Lethal Weapon 2)	Mike Love, Terry Melcher	Mike Love, Carl Wilson, Al Jardine, and Bruce Johnston	3:35
2.	"Somewhere Near Japan"	John Phillips, Bruce Johnston, Love, Melcher	Love, C. Wilson, Jardine, and Johnston	4:48
3.	"Island Girl (I'm Gonna Make Her Mine)"	Al Jardine	C. Wilson, Jardine, and Love	3:49
4.	"In My Car"	Brian Wilson	B. Wilson, C. Wilson, and Jardine	3:21
5.	"Kokomo" (from Cocktail)	Phillips, Scott McKenzie, Love, Melcher	Love and C. Wilson	3:35

Side two
No.	Title	Writer(s)	Lead vocals	Length
6.	"Wipe Out" (single version, with the Fat Boys)	Bob Berryhill, Pat Connolly, Jim Fuller, Ron Wilson	The Fat Boys and B. Wilson	4:00
7.	"Make It Big" (from Troop Beverly Hills)	Love, Bill House, Melcher	C. Wilson, Love, Jardine, and B. Wilson	3:08
8.	"I Get Around" (from Good Morning, Vietnam)	Brian Wilson, Love	B. Wilson and Love	2:09
9.	"Wouldn't It Be Nice" (Made in U.S.A. mix, from The Big Chill)	Brian Wilson, Tony Asher	B. Wilson and Love	2:22
10.	"California Girls" (from Soul Man)	Brian Wilson, Love	Love, B. Wilson, Johnston	2:35

== Personnel ==
Partial credits taken from Still Cruisin' liner notes. (Note: Personnel for "Kokomo" taken from the liner notes for The Beach Boys with the Royal Philharmonic Orchestra, which contains information on the original recording. Personnel for "Wouldn't It Be Nice" per archivists John Brode, Will Crerar, Joshilyn Hoisington and Craig Slowinski.)

The Beach Boys

- Al Jardine – lead, harmony and backing vocals, guitars
- Bruce Johnston – lead, harmony and backing vocals, keyboards, bass guitar
- Mike Love – lead, harmony and backing vocals
- Brian Wilson – lead, harmony and backing vocals; keyboards and synthesizers on "In My Car"
- Carl Wilson – lead, harmony and backing vocals, guitars, keyboards
- Dennis Wilson – harmony and backing vocals on "I Get Around", "Wouldn't It Be Nice" and "California Girls"; drums on "I Get Around"

Additional musicians

- James Grunke – synth programming on "Island Girl"
- Adam Jardine – additional background vocals on "Island Girl"
- Matt Jardine – additional background vocal on "Island Girl"
- Jeffrey Foskett – additional background vocals on "Island Girl"; acoustic rhythm guitar on "Kokomo"
- Michael Bernard – programming on "In My Car"
- Joseph Brasler – guitar on "In My Car"
- Vinnie Colaiuta – drums on "In My Car"
- Ry Cooder – acoustic lead guitar, mandolin, and slide guitar on "Kokomo"
- Rod Clark – bass guitar on "Kokomo"
- Buell Neidlinger – upright bass on "Kokomo"
- Terry Melcher – synth harpsichord on "Kokomo"
- Van Dyke Parks – accordion on "Kokomo"
- Vince Charles, "Milton" and "Mike" (surnames unknown) – steel drums on "Kokomo"
- Jim Keltner – drums and percussion on "Kokomo"
- Chili Charles – percussion on "Kokomo"
- Joel Peskin – saxophone on "Kokomo"
- Hal Blaine – drums on "Wouldn't It Be Nice"
- Frank Capp – jingle stick, timpani, and glockenspiel on "Wouldn't It Be Nice"
- Roy Caton – trumpet on "Wouldn't It Be Nice"
- Jerry Cole – 12-string electric guitar
- Al De Lory – grand piano on "Wouldn't It Be Nice"
- Steve Douglas – tenor saxophone on "Wouldn't It Be Nice"
- Carl Fortina – accordion on "Wouldn't It Be Nice"
- Plas Johnson – tenor saxophone on "Wouldn't It Be Nice"
- Carol Kaye – bass guitar on "Wouldn't It Be Nice"
- Barney Kessel – 12-string electric guitar (Danelectro Bellzouki 7010) on "Wouldn't It Be Nice"
- Larry Knechtel – tack upright piano on "Wouldn't It Be Nice"
- Frank Marocco – accordion on "Wouldn't It Be Nice"
- Jay Migliori – baritone saxophone on "Wouldn't It Be Nice"
- Bill Pitman – acoustic rhythm guitar on "Wouldn't It Be Nice"
- Ray Pohlman – Bass VI on "Wouldn't It Be Nice"
- Lyle Ritz – upright bass on "Wouldn't It Be Nice"

Production staff

- Terry Melcher – producer ("Still Cruisin'", "Somewhere Near Japan", "Kokomo", "Make It Big")
- Brian Wilson – producer ("In My Car", "I Get Around", "Wouldn't It Be Nice", "California Girls"), mixing ("In My Car")
- Alan Jardine – producer ("Island Girl")
- Albert Calbrera – producer ("Wipe Out")
- Tony Moran – producer ("Wipe Out")
- Gary Usher – vocal producer ("Wipe Out"; The Beach Boys' vocal overdubs only)
- Keith Wechsler – engineering and mixing ("Still Cruisin'", "Somewhere Near Japan", "Kokomo", "Make It Big")
- Billy Moss – engineering ("Island Girl")
- Don Weiss – engineering ("Island Firl")
- Mark Linett – engineering and mixing ("In My Car")
- Eddy Schreyer – mastering (all except "Kokomo")
- Stephen Marcussen – mastering ("Kokomo")
- Tommy Steele – art direction

== Charts ==
Chart performance for Still Cruisin'
Chart (1989)	Peak position
Australian Albums (ARIA)	10
Austrian Albums (Ö3 Austria)	12
Dutch Albums (Album Top 100)	92
German Albums (Offizielle Top 100)	26
Swedish Albums (Sverigetopplistan)	43
Swiss Albums (Schweizer Hitparade)	25
US Billboard 200	46

== Certifications ==
Certifications for Still Cruisin'
Region	Certification	Certified units/sales
Australia (ARIA)	Gold	35,000^{^}
Austria (IFPI Austria)	Gold	25,000^{*}
United States (RIAA)	Platinum	1,000,000^{^}
^{*} Sales figures based on certification alone.^{^} Shipments figures based on certification alone.
