= The Rip Chords =

1960s surf rock group

- Origin: Inglewood, California, United States
- Genres: Pop, surf rock, hot rod music
- Years active: 1962–1965
- Members: Original members (1962-65): Ernie Bringas; Phil Stewart; Terry Melcher; Bruce Johnston; Arnie Marcus; Richie Rotkin

The Rip Chords were an early-1960s American vocal group, originally known as the Opposites, composed of Ernie Bringas and Phil Stewart. The group eventually expanded into four primary voices, adding Columbia producer Terry Melcher and co-producer Bruce Johnston (best known as a member of the Beach Boys). This group came to be associated with the hot-rod and surf genres of that day, although their first single ("Here I Stand") did not reflect those styles. They recorded for Columbia Records in Hollywood from 1962 to 1965. The group placed five singles on the Billboard Hot 100. They are best known for their number-four single: "Hey Little Cobra".

== Group history ==
Bringas and Stewart became acquainted during the mid-1950s as students at Inglewood High School (about 10 miles south of Hollywood). They discovered some complementary musical talents and struck up a friendship. Encouraged by their singing compatibility, they were determined to secure a recording contract. They eventually came to the attention of Arwin Records/Daywin Music in 1962.

Actress-singer Doris Day and her husband, film producer Marty Melcher, owned Arwin Records and Daywin Music. Their son, Terry Melcher, had just been hired by Columbia Records as an artist and repertoire (A&R) producer. Arwin Records vice president Bob Crystal saw potential in Bringas and Stewart's voices and quickly arranged for an audition at Columbia Records.

=== Columbia contract ===
Following the audition, Terry Melcher signed Bringas and Stewart to a recording contract at Columbia. Their moniker, the Opposites, seemed appropriate at the time because Bringas was studying for the ministry and Stewart was a private detective, but shortly before their first release, the name was changed to the Rip Chords. The change was prompted by concerns that the Opposites could falsely imply a positive versus negative image of the two friends. According to Melcher, "Actually, I gave them the name and it was just a play on words. It had nothing to do with the TV show Ripcord (spelled without the h)."

The Rip Chords were a vocal group. They were not a band (no musical instruments, although Stewart played limited guitar). Accordingly, Bringas and Stewart needed to be backed instrumentally by studio musicians. These musicians, including guitarist Glen Campbell, drummer Hal Blaine, and bassist Ray Pohlman, and other prominent instrumentalists, were known as the Wrecking Crew.

Terry Melcher produced the Rip Chords' first release, "Here I Stand", a remake of the Wade Flemons version. Recorded on December 17, 1962, it peaked at number 51 on the Billboard Hot 100 in early 1963. Bringas and Stewart were the only singers on the first release. Bringas sang the lead, the falsetto, and also joined Stewart on the background vocals. Bringas and Stewart agreed that "Glen Campbell...gave the song a great lift with his lead guitar. Recent remix attempts have watered down his contribution, but on the original release, the imprint of his lead guitar is indelible."

The group's second single, again produced by Melcher, was "Gone", recorded April 26, 1963. Bringas sang the lead and the falsetto, with Bringas and Stewart doing layered background vocals. Bruce Johnston (a friend of Melcher's) added an interjecting falsetto, and Blossoms member Gracia Nitzche performed the spoken word introduction. Although the song penetrated the Billboard Hot 100, it did not fare as well as the previous hit, "Here I Stand", but did well in certain markets such as San Antonio, Texas, where it climbed to number two on KTSA's top 55 survey.

Following the release of "Gone", a problem arose for the Rip Chords. Bringas had just graduated from California State University at Long Beach and was planning to do graduate work at United Theological Seminary in Dayton, Ohio, where he eventually earned his master of divinity degree. His educational responsibilities would not allow time for the touring aspect of a recording group.

=== Third single ===
Due to his ministerial studies, Bringas was unable to get back to Hollywood for the next recording session. This left Stewart momentarily without a singing partner. Melcher and co-producer Johnston stepped in vocally to fill the void created by Bringas' brief absence; Johnston had already sung with Bringas and Stewart on "Gone". Melcher and Johnston would prove to be a significant addition, as the Rip Chords prepared to record and release their third single.

Their third single was the hit "Hey Little Cobra", vocally layered by Melcher and Johnston, recorded on October 15, 1963. Melcher sang the lead vocal. Johnston and he did the background vocals. The song peaked at number four on the Billboard Hot 100 in February 1964. It reached number three on the New Zealand lever hit parade charts.

Initially, when the "Cobra" single was released, Johnston and Melcher did not receive any credit for their vocal participation. However, Melcher did receive credit as the producer. Following the "Cobra" single and album, both Melcher and Johnston were credited as the two producers on all Rip Chords' music thereafter, but their vocal contributions remained uncredited.

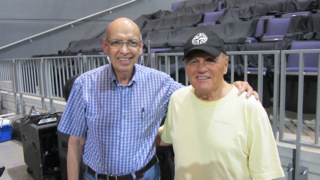
Ernie Bringas (left), co-founder of the Rip Chords, with Bruce Johnston after a July 7, 2012 Beach Boys 50th-anniversary concert in Phoenix, Arizona

=== Two albums and a touring group ===
Following the "Hey Little Cobra" single, Bringas, having missed the previous recording session, was able to rejoin the group. Based on the success of the "Cobra" single, though, the original Rip Chords (Bringas and Stewart) now expanded into four primary voices, adding Melcher and Johnston.

Although Bringas was back in the studio to record, he remained unavailable for touring because of his educational commitment. Therefore, as a practicality, two young men (Rich Rotkin and Arnie Marcus) were brought on board to tour with Stewart as the Rip Chords until the group disbanded in 1965. Thus, Stewart, Rotkin, and Marcus became the official touring version of the Rip Chords. However, Rotkin and Marcus were never vocally involved in any Rip Chords' recordings. Columbia Records never made a distinction between the recording Rip Chords and the touring Rip Chords. On the contrary, only the touring Rip Chords were promoted in all of the publicity campaigns. Their names and pictures appeared in advertisements, interviews, photoshoots, magazines, album covers, and so forth.

Additionally, the touring ensemble was invited to appear on Dick Clark's American Bandstand and toured on Clark's 1964 Caravan of Stars (which included the Supremes and other notables). They also performed in the 1965 Hollywood film, A Swingin' Summer, with Raquel Welch. Therefore, very few of the music industry and the public at large realized that the touring Rip Chords and the recording Rip Chords—with the exception of Stewart—were not the same people.

The Rip Chords' first album (released in early 1964) was Hey Little Cobra and Other Hot Rod Hits, which peaked at number 56 on the national charts. The album featured balanced contributions from Bringas, Stewart, Melcher, and Johnston. Of the 11 vocals, Melcher sang lead on five, Bringas sang lead on five, and Stewart sang lead on one. An instrumental by the Wrecking Crew filled out the album. Its cover listed Bringas and Stewart as vocalists, omitting Melcher and Johnston, and incorrectly including Rotkin and Marcus.

The group's fourth single was "Three Window Coupe", released in April 1964 with Melcher singing lead, peaking at number 28 on the national charts. Although all four singers contributed to the recording, the Melcher-Johnston sound predominated. Johnston and Melcher's experience and vocals were a major factor in the California Sound of the Rip Chords' music.

The Three Window Coupe album (CS 9016 or CL 2216), released three weeks after the "Three Window Coupe" single, added another 11 vocals: Melcher sang lead on six of them, Bringas and Stewart sang lead on four, and Melcher and Bringas shared the lead on one song ("My Big Gun Board"). Like Hey Little Cobra and other Hot Rod Hits, its liner notes erroneously listed Rotkin and Marcus as vocalists and Melcher and Johnston's vocal involvement was not mentioned. The 2006 Summer U.S.A.! The Best of the Rip Chords released by Sundazed Music clarified all musicians involved. According to the re-released 2006 CD cover: "No group epitomized the sun-soaked California Sound better than the fabulous Rip Chords... Led by legendary producer Terry Melcher along with future Beach Boy Bruce Johnston and ace-vocalists Ernie Bringas and Phil Stewart, these long-board big-guns left an indelible mark on the surf'n strip sounds of the '60s..." A picture of that foursome — Terry Melcher, Bruce Johnston, Ernie Bringas, Phil Stewart — is on the inside cover of the 2006 CD booklet, along with photos of the touring Rip Chords.

The Rip Chords' last significant release was the single "One Piece Topless Bathing Suit" in June 1964, with Bringas and Melcher singing lead. Although it reached the national charts, it failed to generate major activity. In February 1965, a final single, "Don't Be Scared", failed to chart nationally.

Shortly after the release of "Don't Be Scared", the group disbanded after five singles on the Billboard Hot 100 and two albums reflecting the surf music of the day. Stephen J. McParland summarized, "But something as trendy and timely as the Rip Chords' sound and image also had a built-in clock, something like those little pop-up thermometers they used to implant in roasting chickens. When your time's up, you're done." Melcher, Johnston, Bringas, and Stewart recorded no music as the Rip Chords after the breakup in 1965.

=== New Rip Chords ===
Using the Rip Chords name, Bruce Johnston and Terry Melcher contributed a single track, "Sealed With A Kiss", to an album by Mike Love and Dean Torrence called Rock'n'Roll Again produced for the Radio Shack US chain store in 1983.

Rotkin and Marcus, who toured with Stewart, revived the group during the mid-1990s with additional members. The new group tours and records as the Rip Chords. In 2010, the new group released a Spectra Records CD entitled The Best of the Rip Chords ... Today (not to be confused with the 2006 Summer U.S.A. The Best of the Rip Chords released by Sundazed Music). The Sundazed release features the 1960s original singing Rip Chords, the Spectra release does not.

== Unreleased material and background vocals ==
In 2006, Sundazed Music released Summer U.S.A.! The Best of the Rip Chords with four additional songs, three previously unreleased. The three unreleased songs were "Wiameah Bay", an instrumental by the Wrecking Crew, and two Rip Chords hot-rod songs ("Sting Ray" and "XKE"), which had been in Columbia's vault since 1965. The fourth song was "Red Hot Roadster", originally scheduled for release as a single, but instead appeared on the soundtrack of 1965's A Swingin' Summer. Apart from the soundtrack and the 2006 CD, it was released in 1996 on the Sundazed Three Window Coupe CD. Bringas and Stewart sang background vocals on Surfin' USA by the Hot Doggers (Bruce & Terry). Also, the backing vocals on Pat Boone's version of "Beach Girl" are the vocals that are on the Rip Chords' version.

== Discography ==
=== Singles ===
- 1962–63: "Here I Stand" (Bringas on lead vocal) backed with "Karen" (Bringas and Stewart on lead): Billboard number 51
- 1963: "Gone" (Bringas on lead) b/w "She Thinks I Still Care" (Bringas on lead): Billboard number 88
- 1963–64: "Hey Little Cobra" (Melcher on lead) b/w "The Queen" (Melcher on lead): Billboard number 4; CHUM number 5.
- 1964: "Three Window Coupe" (Melcher on lead) b/w "Hot Rod U.S.A." (Melcher on lead): Billboard number 28; CHUM number 34
- 1964: "One Piece Topless Bathing Suit" (Melcher and Bringas on lead) b/w "Wah-Wahini" (Melcher on lead): Billboard number 96.
- 1965: "Don't Be Scared" (Melcher on lead) b/w "Bunny Hill" (instrumental by the Wrecking Crew)

=== Albums ===
Hey Little Cobra and Other Hot Rod Hits: (Columbia, February 1964) #56. Billboard Album Chart.

- "Hey Little Cobra" (Melcher on lead)
- "Here I Stand" (Bringas on lead)
- "The Queen" (Melcher on lead)
- "409" (Bringas on lead)
- "Trophy Machine" (Melcher on lead)
- "Gone" (Bringas on lead)
- "Little Deuce Coupe" (Melcher on lead)
- "'40 Ford Time" (Instrumental by the Wrecking Crew)
- "She Thinks I Still Care" (Bringas on lead)
- "Shut Down" (Bringas on lead)
- "Drag City" (Melcher on lead)
- "Ding Dong" (Bringas on lead)

Three Window Coupe: (Columbia, September 1964)

- "Three Window Coupe" (Melcher on lead)
- "Bonneville Bonnie" (Stewart on lead)
- "Gas Money" (Bringas on lead)
- "This Little Woodie" (Melcher on lead)
- "Hot Rod U.S.A." (Melcher on lead)
- "Old Car Made In '52" (Stewart on lead)
- "Surfin' Craze" (Bringas on lead)
- "Beach Girl" (Melcher on lead)
- "My Big Gun Board" (Melcher and Bringas on lead)
- "Surf City" (Melcher on lead)
- "Summer U.S.A." (Melcher on lead)
- "Big Wednesday" (instrumental by the Wrecking Crew)

Summer U.S.A.! The Best of the Rip Chords: (Sundazed, 27 June 2006)

- Hey Little Cobra
- The Queen
- Trophy Machine
- Here I Stand
- Karen
- Gone
- Three Window Coupe
- This Little Woodie
- Hot Rod U.S.A.
- Surfin' Craze
- Beach Girl
- My Big Gun Board
- Summer U.S.A.
- One Piece Topless Bathing Suit
- Wah-Wahini
- Don't Be Scared
- Red Hot Roadster
- Wiameah Bay
- Stingray
- X.K.E
