= Kokomo (song) =

1988 single by the Beach Boys

- Spanish single artwork

Single by the Beach Boys

from the album Cocktail and Still Cruisin'
- B-side: "Tutti Frutti" (performed by Little Richard)
- Released: July 8, 1988
- Recorded: March 22, April 5–6, 1988
- Genre: Yacht rock; soft rock
- Length: 3:35
- Label: Elektra; Capitol
- Songwriters: John Phillips; Scott McKenzie; Mike Love; Terry Melcher
- Producer: Terry Melcher

The Beach Boys singles chronology
"Happy Endings" (1987)	"Kokomo" (1988)	"Still Cruisin'" (1989)

Music video
- "Kokomo" on YouTube

"Kokomo" is a song by the American rock band the Beach Boys from the 1988 film Cocktail and album Still Cruisin'. Written by John Phillips, Scott McKenzie, Mike Love and Terry Melcher, the song was released as a single in July 1988 by Elektra Records and became a number-one hit in the US and Australia. It was the band's first original top-20 single in 20 years, their first number-one hit in 22 years and their final top-40 hit.

The lyrics describe two lovers taking a trip to a fictional place called Kokomo. Not much about it is described except for its location off the Florida Keys and comparisons to other real destinations in the Caribbean islands such as Aruba, Jamaica, Bahamas, Martinique and Montserrat, as well as Key Largo, Florida, and the North Atlantic island of Bermuda. Besides Kokomo, Indiana, US, and Kokomo, Mississippi, the only real-world places that used the name "Kokomo" were inspired by the song; these include a Kokomo Beach at the Casa Marina Resort in Key West, which is no longer called by that name, as well as a Kokomo Beach on the island of Curaçao, which still bears the name.

== Background ==
The verse of the song came from a demo by John Phillips (formerly of the Mamas & the Papas) and Scott McKenzie (best known for his 1967 song "San Francisco (Be Sure to Wear Flowers in Your Hair)", which Phillips wrote). The Beach Boys' Mike Love added the chorus which lists the names of islands and suggested that Phillips change the lyrics from past tense to present tense, transforming the tone of the song from melancholic to inviting.

== Recording ==
"Kokomo" was recorded on March 22 and April 5–6, 1988, with production by Terry Melcher, who had previously produced the band's "Rock 'n' Roll to the Rescue" (1986) and "California Dreamin'" (1986). It was created through overdubbing parts onto the band's demo for the song.

The recording featured every current member of the group except Brian Wilson, who did not attend the sessions. In his 1991 memoir Wouldn't It Be Nice: My Own Story, Brian Wilson claims he was unable to contribute to the song because he was committed to recording his first solo album and his bandmates deliberately did not inform him of the session date until it was too late. According to biographer Mark Dillon, "Available session-date information does not substantiate this claim, however."

Mike Love stated that Brian was not on "Kokomo" because Eugene Landy, Brian Wilson's therapist-turned-collaborator, refused to "let Brian sing on it unless Landy was a producer and co-writer," and Melcher did not "feel he needed Landy since he had produced some number-one records. It was pathetic of Landy to do that, but he controlled Brian completely at that time." According to a 2018 article in Stereogum, "When [Brian] first heard the song on the radio, he didn’t even recognize it as a Beach Boys tune." The group later recorded a Spanish-language version of "Kokomo" with participation from Brian.

== Music video ==
The video for "Kokomo" was filmed at the then-recently opened Grand Floridian Resort at Walt Disney World in Florida. Although they had not played these instruments on the recording, Mike Love is holding a saxophone, Al Jardine is playing tambourine, Carl Wilson is playing guitar, and Bruce Johnston is playing bass, with touring drummer Mike Kowalski in his usual role, and actor and occasional Beach Boys live guest John Stamos is playing steel drum.

In 2011, NME ranked the video as the 17th worst of all time, commenting, "It was as if Mike Love had taken the 'Beach Boys' name straight out of Brian Wilson's hands and we were forced to watch footage of Tom Cruise mixing up Bloody Marys. Thanks guys."

== Release ==
After being released as a single in 1988, the song was included on the soundtrack album for the movie Cocktail, as well as the 1989 Beach Boys album Still Cruisin'. The Beach Boys also performed the song on an episode of Full House, as well as an episode of the soap opera One Life to Live.

"Kokomo" was nominated for the Grammy Award for Best Song Written Specifically for a Motion Picture or Television in 1988, but lost to Phil Collins's "Two Hearts" (from the film Buster). In a tie vote, "Two Hearts" and Carly Simon's "Let the River Run" from Working Girl beat "Kokomo" for the Golden Globe Award for Best Original Song.

== Critical reception ==
Despite its commercial success, "Kokomo" has attracted mostly negative reviews from music writers. Jimmy Guterman of Rolling Stone wrote that the song "sets the pattern for the new, passion-free songs" on Still Cruisin', while the Rolling Stone album guide called it a "joyless ditty". In a 1998 piece, Steve Simels of Stereo described it as "insipid". Blender stated the song was "perhaps most kindly described as a Beach Boys–influenced song with the Beach Boys singing on it". Cash Box called it a "snappy little throw-back of a tune" with "a real islands-vibe and hooky chorus."

Since its release, "Kokomo" has become notorious for its negative critical reception. It has appeared on several worst songs of all time lists, such as Blender's top 50 worst songs, Dallas Observer's ten worst songs by great artists, and Forbes' worst lyrics of all time. Tom Breihan of Stereogum wrote: "People hate 'Kokomo.' The Beach Boys' improbable late-career hit has a reputation as a monument to mediocrity. To this day, it serves as a textbook cautionary tale of a once-beloved group poisoning its own legacy and goodwill by making smarmy '80s yuppie pablum." In a retrospective dubbing the song the "worst summer song ever", MEL Magazine's Tim Grierson wrote: "A lot of us have taken immense delight in hating this 1988 smash." Both Breihan and Grierson attribute their personal dislike of Mike Love as a possible factor for their negative opinion of the song.

Drummer Jim Keltner, who played on "Kokomo", attributed the critical disdain to the song being "just sooo syrupy pop ... But while the critics killed it with their words, they couldn't kill the 'hitness' of it. It's just a bona fide hit record, that's all there is to it."

== In popular culture ==
=== The Muppets ===
"Kokomo" was covered by Jim Henson's Muppets on the album Muppet Beach Party in 1993. The Beach Boys' lyrics were changed from "gave me a tropical contact high" to the more family-friendly phrase "under a tropical island sky" for the Muppets' rendition.

The Muppets characters, including Kermit the Frog, appeared in a music video for their rendition of the song, directed by Brian Henson and filmed in Los Angeles.

=== Full House ===
In 1988, the Beach Boys performed "Kokomo" and other songs in the Full House episode "Beach Boy Bingo". This occurred due to their relationship with John Stamos, who played Uncle Jesse on the show, as well as the success of the song that year (with Stamos appearing in the video).

=== Space Force ===
In the first episode of Netflix's 2020 workplace comedy TV series Space Force, General Mark R. Naird sings the song in his office to calm himself down in anticipation of a controversial rocket launch. Additionally, in the 2022 series finale of the show, the concluding scene has the Space Force staff realize that they have spotted an asteroid headed directly for Earth. As an absurdist way to calm down, they break out in a chorus of "Kokomo".

== Track listings ==
3-inch CD single

1. "Kokomo" – 3:34
2. "Tutti Frutti" performed by Little Richard – 2:23
3. "Hippy Hippy Shake" performed by The Georgia Satellites – 1:45

7-inch single

1. "Kokomo" – 3:34
2. "Tutti Frutti" performed by Little Richard – 2:23

12-inch maxi

1. "Kokomo" – 3:34
2. "Tutti Frutti" performed by Little Richard – 2:23
3. "Hippy Hippy Shake" performed by The Georgia Satellites – 1:45

== Personnel ==
Per Mark Dillon, engineer Keith Wechsler, and The Beach Boys with the Royal Philharmonic Orchestra liner notes. (Note: The liner notes contain information on the original recordings of the songs featured.)

The Beach Boys

- Al Jardine – vocals
- Bruce Johnston – vocals
- Mike Love – vocals
- Carl Wilson – vocals

Additional musicians

- Ry Cooder – acoustic lead guitar, mandolin, slide guitar
- Chili Charles – percussion
- Rod Clark – bass guitar
- Jeffrey Foskett – acoustic rhythm guitar
- Jim Keltner – drums
- Vince Charles – steel drums
- Milton and Mike (surnames unknown) – steel drums
- Van Dyke Parks — accordion
- Joel Peskin – saxophone

Production staff

- Terry Melcher – producer
- Keith Wechsler – engineer

== Other versions ==
- In 2003, American singer-songwriters Adam Green and Ben Kweller covered the song for Green's Jessica EP.

== Charts ==
=== Weekly charts ===
Weekly chart performance for "Kokomo"
Chart (1988–1989)	Peak position
Australia (ARIA)	1
Belgium (Ultratop 50 Flanders)	19
Canada Top Singles (RPM)	4
Denmark (Hitlisten)	5
Europe (Eurochart Hot 100)	17
Finland (Soumen Virallinen)	27
France (SNEP)	6
Iceland (RÚV)	1
Japan Hot 100	84
Netherlands (Dutch Top 40)	6
Netherlands (Single Top 100)	4
New Zealand (Recorded Music NZ)	5
Sweden (Sverigetopplistan)	14
Switzerland (Schweizer Hitparade)	8
UK Singles (OCC)	25
US Billboard Hot 100	1
US Adult Contemporary (Billboard)	5
US Cash Box Top 100	1
West Germany (GfK)	7

=== Year-end charts ===
1988 year-end chart performance for "Kokomo"
Chart (1988)	Rank
Canada RPM	25
US Billboard Hot 100	42
US Adult Contemporary (Billboard)	44
US Cash Box Top 100	39

1989 year-end chart performance for "Kokomo"
Chart (1989)	Rank
Australia (ARIA)	9
Europe (Eurochart Hot 100)	66
Netherlands (Dutch Top 40)	59
Netherlands (Single Top 100)	58
West Germany (Media Control)	37

== Certifications ==
Certifications for "Kokomo"
Region	Certification	Certified units/sales
Australia (ARIA)	Platinum	70,000^{^}
France (SNEP)	Silver	200,000^{*}
New Zealand (RMNZ)	2× Platinum	60,000^{‡}
United Kingdom (BPI)	Silver	200,000^{‡}
United States (RIAA)	4× Platinum	4,000,000^{‡}
^{*} Sales figures based on certification alone.^{^} Shipments figures based on certification alone.^{‡} Sales+streaming figures based on certification alone.
