= Disney Girls (1957) =

1971 song by the Beach Boys

- The Dutch single release of the song, backed with "Surf's Up"

Single by the Beach Boys

from the album Surf's Up
- Released: August 30, 1971
- Recorded: June 3, 1971
- Genre: Sunshine pop
- Length: 4:07
- Label: Brother/Reprise
- Songwriter: Bruce Johnston
- Producer: The Beach Boys

Licensed audio
- "Disney Girls (1957)" on YouTube

"Disney Girls (1957)" is a song by American rock band the Beach Boys from their 1971 album Surf's Up. It was written and sung by Bruce Johnston, who also plays upright piano, Moog synthesizer, and mandolin. Johnston later rerecorded the song for his 1977 solo album, Going Public.

== Background and lyrics ==
"Disney Girls (1957)" is a nostalgic reflection sung from the viewpoint of a man who rejects reality in favor of the nostalgia he felt towards the fantasy world of the girls in Walt Disney movies and television shows, songs by Patti Page and the days he made wine in his garage, enjoying lemonade in the country shade. Johnston said that he wrote the song "because I saw so many kids in our audiences being wiped out on drugs" and he had wanted to capture the feeling of an era in which people were "a little naive but a little healthier."

== Recognition and legacy ==
"Disney Girls (1957)" has proven to be one of Bruce Johnston's most enduring songs, still occasionally performed by the Beach Boys in concert. It has been covered by many artists, including Art Garfunkel, Cass Elliot, Alexander Rybak, Doris Day, Jack Jones and Captain & Tennille. Elliot's version (from the album Cass Elliot) features Johnston and Carl Wilson.

Brian Wilson praised the song for its harmonies and chords.

== Personnel ==
Credits from Craig Slowinski

The Beach Boys

- Al Jardine – backing vocals
- Bruce Johnston – lead and backing vocals, whistling, upright pianos, Hammond organ, Moog synthesizer, mandolins
- Mike Love – backing vocals
- Brian Wilson – backing vocals
- Carl Wilson – backing vocals

Additional musicians

- Ed Carter – electric guitar (w/ wah-wah pedal), acoustic guitars
- Dennis Dragon – drums
- Kathy Dragon – flutes
