= Robert Lyn Nelson =

American artist (born 1955)

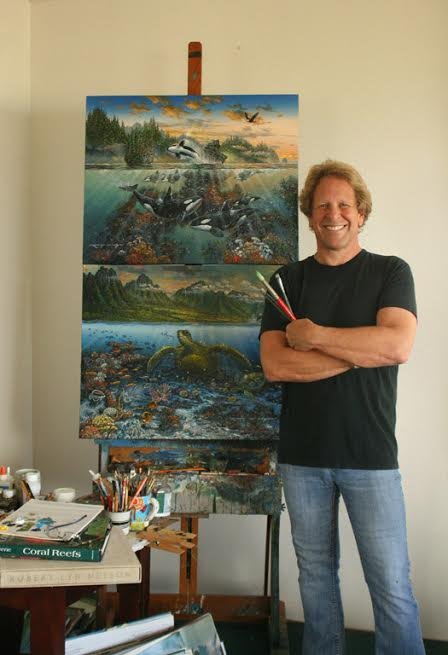
- Robert Lyn Nelson in his studio
- Born: 1955 (age 70–71); San Bernardino County, California
- Occupation: Artist
- Known for: Marine wildlife paintings

Robert Lyn Nelson (born 1955) is an American painter, sculptor, and environmental advocate known for his marine wildlife paintings, particularly compositions that simultaneously depict life above and below the ocean's surface. This approach, often referred to as his Two Worlds style, combines detailed representations of marine environments with elements of surrealism and imaginative perspective.

Born in San Bernardino County, California, Nelson began studying art as a child and attended college-level art courses while still in high school. He moved to Oahu, Hawaii in 1973 and later established his professional career on Maui. His work encompasses marine realism, surrealism, abstraction, cubism, impressionism, portraiture, and mixed media.

Nelson's painting From Sea to Shining Sea was exhibited at the United States Pavilion during Expo 1998 in Lisbon, Portugal, and at the Smithsonian Institution's National Museum of Natural History in Washington, D.C., in 2001. He has also created artwork for musical recordings, illustrated children's books, and participated in marine conservation initiatives.

== Early life and education ==
Nelson was born in 1955 in San Bernardino County, California, and grew up in the Ontario area. His father, a draftsman, encouraged his artistic interests and taught him principles of perspective, light, and shadow. Nelson began drawing at approximately three years old and experimented with painting, sculpture, landscapes, seascapes, and still lifes during childhood.

He attended Chaffey High School in Ontario, California, where his artistic interests were encouraged by history teacher David Radcliff. According to a 2016 letter from Radcliff to the Maui Arts & Cultural Center, Nelson was permitted to undertake independent studies of the visual arts of different historical periods, including Greek and Roman art.

During these studies, Nelson examined the work of Dutch painters, including Johan Barthold Jongkind and Rembrandt van Rijn. He copied Jongkind's Windmills of Rotterdam and produced a series of studies based on Rembrandt's portraits. In a 1991 interview with Hawaiian Airlines Magazine, Nelson recalled studying Rembrandt's work when he was approximately ten or eleven years old.

At age 13, Nelson received opportunities to study art at Chaffey College and Mount San Antonio College while continuing his secondary education. A 1985 Maui News profile reported that some of his college classmates, including Vietnam War veterans, nicknamed him “Picasso.”

Nelson began publicly exhibiting his artwork as a teenager. A 1996 Great Galleries profile reported that he participated in his first public exhibition at age 15 and held his first solo exhibition at 16. His early exhibitions included shows in banks, offices, and other public and commercial spaces in Southern California.

Nelson completed approximately four years of college-level art training before turning 18. According to Larry V. LeDoux's Regency Hawaii profile, he was offered a scholarship to continue his studies at an art academy in San Francisco but instead decided to move to Hawaii.

== Career ==
=== Early Work ===
Nelson moved to Oahu, Hawaii, in 1973 at age 18. He initially painted Hawaiian landscapes and seascapes while supporting himself through various jobs. At age 22, he relocated to Maui, where he continued surfing, kayaking, diving, and studying the islands' coastal environments.

Before becoming a full-time professional artist, Nelson worked as a dishwasher and bartender. According to a 1985 interview with The Maui News, he began supporting himself primarily through painting at approximately age 21.

Nelson's early work encompassed portraits, still lifes, landscapes, and cityscapes. His subjects included musicians, architectural scenes, and figurative compositions. He eventually became particularly associated with marine wildlife painting, which developed into the central focus of his commercial career during the late 1970s and 1980s.

His painting techniques frequently involved detailed research, photography, and direct observation of wildlife and natural environments. LeDoux described Nelson's use of very fine brushes, sometimes containing only a few bristles, and extended painting sessions to produce highly detailed images.

Nelson also developed a business around his artwork. A February 1994 article in Hawaii Business, titled “Success by 40,” reported that Robert Lyn Nelson Studios had grown into a business valued at approximately $5 million by the mid-1990s. The article described his use of print, radio, and television advertising to promote his paintings.

In 1994, Nelson opened Robert Lyn Nelson Studios in Lahaina on the island of Maui. A 1996 Great Galleries article reported that the business later moved into a larger space on Cannery Row.

Throughout his career, Nelson continued experimenting with artistic subjects and techniques beyond marine realism. His paintings have included portraits of musicians, abstract compositions, and works inspired by popular culture.

=== Marine Life ===
Nelson is best known for his Two Worlds paintings, which depict marine environments above and below the water's surface in a single composition. This approach combines visible coastal scenery with underwater ecosystems, allowing viewers to observe both environments simultaneously.

Nelson traced the development of this style to his experiences surfing and diving in Hawaii. In interviews, he recalled encountering whales while surfing off Maui in the 1970s. A close encounter with a humpback whale in 1977 was particularly influential in his decision to depict marine life.

His first painting in the style, “Two Worlds,” was completed in 1979. The work combined a view of Lahaina's coastal landscape and historic buildings with an imagined underwater scene. Nelson explained in a 1994 Artists Choice publication that the composition was more surrealist than strictly realistic because it employed multiple perspectives, selective architecture, and imaginative underwater lighting.

The technique became associated with what Nelson and some published profiles have called the Two Worlds Environmental Surrealist School of Painting or the Modern Marine Art Movement.

His marine paintings frequently depict humpback whales, dolphins, sea turtles, tropical fish, coral reefs, and other ocean wildlife. Although individual animals and habitats are often represented realistically, their placement within the composition can involve imaginative perspectives and lighting effects.

Nelson's work also reflects his experiences scuba diving, snorkeling, kayaking, and surfing. He has described these activities as essential to his understanding of marine environments and their visual characteristics.

In a 2001 interview with The Washington Times, Nelson discussed the relationship between his paintings and marine conservation, explaining that his work sought to communicate the beauty and diversity of ocean ecosystems.

=== Hawaiian Influence ===
Hawaii has played a central role in Nelson's life and work since his arrival in 1973. He initially lived on Oahu before relocating to Maui in 1977, where the islands' coastal landscapes, wildlife, and maritime history became recurring artistic subjects. Nelson developed a particular interest in Lahaina, a historic whaling port on Maui's western coast. His paintings incorporated scenes of whales, sailing ships, tropical coastlines, and the relationship between the ocean and the Hawaiian Islands.

According to Lahaina Galleries founder Jim Killett, the gallery encouraged Nelson to explore historical whaling subjects because of Lahaina's maritime heritage. Killett recalled that Nelson's early underwater whale paintings attracted immediate interest from collectors and contributed to the gallery's growth.

Nelson's marine paintings also emphasized the relationship between the ocean's surface and underwater habitats. The visual contrast between the islands' mountains, beaches, and marine ecosystems became an important element of his Two Worlds compositions.

Following the August 2023 Lahaina wildfires, which destroyed a warehouse containing much of his art, Nelson created more than a dozen paintings responding to the disaster. These works explored the destruction of the historic town and the emotional significance of its landscape.

Among them was “Devastation and Beauty,” a painting juxtaposing the damaged Lahaina waterfront with the island of Lānaʻi in the distance. In a 2024 interview with Maui Nō Ka ʻOi Magazine, Nelson discussed his efforts to commemorate Lahaina and contribute to the community's recovery through art.

=== Abstract Art ===
Although Nelson's reputation developed primarily through realist marine paintings, he has experimented with abstraction and nonrepresentational art throughout his career. In a 1985 interview with Sandi Stanfield in The Maui News, Nelson described his earlier abstract work and his preference at that time for the technical demands of realism.

A 1996 Great Galleries article documented his interest in impressionism, neo-cubism, neo-futurism, and nonrepresentational painting. The article featured Pacific Coast Abstraction, a triptych emphasizing geometric forms and color relationships.

Nelson's later abstract paintings have incorporated elements of cubism, surrealism, and expressionism. His artistic influences have included Pablo Picasso, Georges Braque, Salvador Dalí, David Hockney, Gerhard Richter, and Georgia O'Keeffe. In a 2024 interview with Maui Nō Ka ʻOi, Nelson described his continued experimentation with different artistic styles and media, including sculpture, collage, and mixed-media compositions.

=== Commisions ===
Nelson has produced artwork for international exhibitions, musical recordings, and environmental initiatives. In 1992, he created the artwork for the Beach Boys' album "Summer in Paradise" with inside cover "Ring of Life," outside cover "Elements of the Universe," inside panels "Embraced by the Sea," and inside pocket "Amethyst Dawn at Kipuhulu." The album was released during the band's 30th-anniversary year.

In September 1993, The Honolulu Advertiser reported that Nelson's painting Planetary Choir had been selected by the Bank of the Republic of Palau for a proposed commemorative coin series. The planned coins were intended to reproduce his artwork and support marine conservation efforts in Palau.

In 1997, Nelson's painting “Rainforests of the Sea” was reproduced as a poster for the International Year of the Reef. He also created and donated artwork to the National Oceanic and Atmospheric Administration (NOAA) in support of marine conservation initiatives.

Nelson's painting "From Sea to Shining Sea" was commissioned for the International Year of the Ocean in 1998. The work was exhibited at the United States Pavilion during Expo 1998 in Lisbon, Portugal. The painting presents a composite view of North American marine environments, including wildlife from the Pacific Ocean, Gulf of Mexico, and Atlantic Ocean. It combines species from different geographic regions within a single imagined coastal landscape. In 2001, “From Sea to Shining Sea” became the centerpiece of an exhibition at the Smithsonian Institution's National Museum of Natural History.

=== Other Media and Technology ===
Nelson began publishing limited-edition reproductions of his paintings in 1981. According to Larry V. LeDoux's Regency Hawaii profile, the prints made his work available to a wider audience and contributed to the development of his commercial art business.

His work has appeared in lithographs, limited-edition prints, calendars, album covers, books, and other published formats. In a 1985 interview, Nelson also discussed plans to expand into bronze sculpture.

Nelson has produced musical-themed artwork, including portraits and surrealist compositions inspired by the Beatles and other musicians. His Beatles Tribute Series includes paintings interpreting the band's music and imagery.

In addition to painting, Nelson has worked with sculpture, collage, and mixed media. His later practice has incorporated both traditional and contemporary techniques.

==== Children's Books ====
Nelson authored and illustrated Our Ocean Home (1997), published by Cooper Square Publishing. The book follows a sea turtle named Honu and introduces young readers to marine ecosystems and environmental conservation.

His second illustrated children's book, Ocean Friends (2003), also published by Cooper Square Publishing, features a bottlenose dolphin named Naia and introduces readers to marine animals and their habitats.

Our Ocean Home received a Book Achievement Award from the Midwest Independent Publishers Association, according to Nelson's official biography.

== Exhibitions ==
Nelson began exhibiting his paintings as a teenager in Southern California. A 2006 Inland Valley Daily Bulletin article described his early exhibitions and reported that his first show sold out. His work appeared in solo and group exhibitions held in banks, offices, and other public and commercial spaces.

After relocating to Hawaii, Nelson exhibited his work through galleries on Maui, particularly in Lahaina and the resort communities of West Maui. Larry V. LeDoux's Regency Hawaii profile identified Lahaina Gallery, Casay Gallery, and Kapalua Gallery among the venues displaying his work during the 1980s. In 1982, entertainer John Davidson hosted an exhibition featuring Nelson's paintings.

In January 1991, Nelson participated in the Ocean Art Festival at Lahaina Galleries. The event featured marine-themed artwork and was discussed in George Fuller's article “Double Vision” in Hawaiian Airlines Magazine.

In 1994, Nelson opened Robert Lyn Nelson Studios in Lahaina, which subsequently relocated to a larger space on Cannery Row.

In 1998, Nelson's painting “From Sea to Shining Sea" was exhibited at the United States Pavilion during Expo 1998 in Lisbon, Portugal, as part of the International Year of the Ocean. From March through October 2001, Nelson's work was featured in “From Sea to Shining Sea: A Celebration of National Marine Sanctuaries” at the Smithsonian Institution's National Museum of Natural History in Washington, D.C. The exhibition included the painting “From Sea to Shining Sea” alongside several other works by Nelson.

Jean-Michel Cousteau spoke at the exhibition's opening and praised Nelson's approach to marine painting. The National Marine Sanctuary Foundation announced plans for a nationwide tour following the exhibition.

In December 2009, Shanghai Daily reported that Nelson was preparing a solo exhibition in Shanghai. The article discussed his work in connection with international art exhibitions and environmental themes associated with Expo 2010.

In August 2026, Nelson participated in Lahaina Galleries' 50th-anniversary celebration at The Shops at Wailea on Maui. The exhibition featured seven artists, including Nelson, his daughter Sienna Nelson, Steve Turnbull, Ronaldo Macedo, Pete Cabrinha, Gabriel Burchman, and Douglas Ball.

== Personal Life ==
Nelson has lived in Hawaii since 1973 and has maintained a longstanding connection to Maui. His interests in surfing, diving, kayaking, and marine wildlife have influenced both his personal life and artistic practice.

Nelson has two daughters, Margaux and Sienna. Margaux has worked as a fine-art consultant for Lahaina Galleries and has two children, Lennon and Sloane. Sienna followed in her father’s footsteps and is an artist. Both have been associated with the gallery's activities.

Sienna Nelson's paintings were featured alongside her father's work during Lahaina Galleries' 50th-anniversary exhibition in August 2026.

Following the August 2023 Lahaina wildfires, Nelson created a series of paintings commemorating the town. In a 2024 interview with Maui Nō Ka ʻOi Magazine, he described the emotional significance of Lahaina and his response to the destruction of his home and community.
