= Going Public (Bruce Johnston album) =

Studio album by Bruce Johnston
- Released: May 1977
- Genre: Pop rock
- Length: 34:53
- Label: Columbia
- Producer: Gary Usher

Bruce Johnston chronology
Surfin' Round the World (1963)	Going Public (1977)

Professional ratings
Review scores
Source	Rating
Allmusic	3/5 stars
Music Week	2/4 stars

Going Public is the third solo album by Beach Boys member Bruce Johnston, released in May 1977 by Columbia Records. It is his only solo album recorded after joining the Beach Boys, made during a period when he had temporarily left.

The album contains re-recordings of two of Johnston's compositions with the band, "Deirdre" and "Disney Girls," as well as "I Write the Songs" which had been a No. 1 hit for Barry Manilow the year prior.

== Track listing ==
All tracks composed and arranged by Bruce Johnston; except where indicated

Side 1
No.	Title	Writer(s)	Length
1.	"I Write the Songs"		4:05
2.	"Deirdre"	Johnston, Brian Wilson	4:10
3.	"Thank You, Baby"		4:23
4.	"Rendezvous"	Johnston, Bill Hudson, Brett Hudson, Mark Hudson	2:27
5.	"Won't Somebody Dance with Me"	Lynsey De Paul	4:01

Side 2
No.	Title	Writer(s)	Length
6.	"Disney Girls"		5:09
7.	"Rock and Roll Survivor"		2:54
8.	"Don't Be Scared"		3:08
9.	"Pipeline"	Brian Carman, Bob Spickard; arranged by John Hobbs	4:36
Total length:			34:53

== Personnel ==
- Bruce Johnston – lead vocals, piano, electric piano, backing vocals, guitar, arrangements of backing vocals
- John Hobbs – piano, electric piano, guitar
- Gary Mallaber – drums
- Caleb Quaye – electric guitar
- Joe Chemay – bass, backing vocals
- Ed Carter – acoustic guitar
- Michael Anthony – acoustic guitar
- Richie Zito – electric guitar
- Igor Horoshevsky – cello
- Jon Joyce – cello, backing vocals
- Kathy Dragon – flute
- Chad Stuart – acoustic guitar
- Curt Boettcher (as Curt Becher) – backing vocals, arrangements of backing vocals
- Cindy Bullens, Jim Haas, Brent Nelson, Diana Lee, Gary Puckett – backing vocals
- Bob Alcivar – horn and string arrangements
- Harry Betts – string arrangement on "Won't Somebody Dance with Me"
- California Boys Choir – backing vocals on "I Write the Songs", arranged by Douglas Neslund
- Bill Fletcher – engineer
