= The Danleers =

American doo-wop group

- Origin: Brooklyn, New York City, United States
- Genres: Doo-wop; rhythm and blues
- Years active: 1958–1964; 1972–1993
- Labels: AMP 3; Mercury; Epic; Everest; Le-Mans; Smash
- Past members: Jimmy Weston; Johnny Lee; Willie Ephraim; Nat McCune; Roosevelt Mays

The Danleers were an American doo-wop group formed in Brooklyn, New York City, in 1958. The group's original and most famous lineup consisted of Jimmy Weston, Johnny Lee, Willie Ephraim, Nat McCune, and Roosevelt Mays. One of many streetcorner vocal groups in Brooklyn, they rose to prominence in 1958 on the strength of the single "One Summer Night", written by their manager, Danny Webb, who also named the group. The single was one of the biggest hits of that year and sold over one million copies. Further releases were not so successful, and the group mostly dissolved by the mid-1960s. It continued to tour for several decades with Weston as the main original member.

== Background ==
The Danleers formed in Brooklyn in early 1958, joining the ranks of the many streetcorner doo-wop groups existing at the time. Danny Webb became the group’s manager and principal songwriter, naming them after himself. The group recorded their debut single, "One Summer Night", for the AMP 3 label, owned by Bill Lasley, who signed the group in the spring of 1958. The song began gaining traction regionally, and unable to handle distribution, the label leased the single to Mercury Records. Mercury helped push the record to become one of that year’s biggest summer songs, selling over one million copies. "One Summer Night" reached number four on the Billboard Black Singles chart, and number seven on the Best Selling Pop Singles in Stores chart in 1958.

The group joined Buddy Holly, Frankie Avalon, Bobby Darin, and others on the Biggest Show of Stars 1958 Fall edition. Their efforts with subsequent singles were not successes. They released two more singles on Mercury before the label dropped them, and they dissolved as the decade closed. Weston and Webb were determined to have another hit single, and signed with Epic in 1960 with a new lineup. Their first release for Epic, "If You Don't Care", did not attract attention, nor did any other releases from the group. The group continued to tour in support of their one hit for several decades, with various members. The original group reformed for one show at the Westbury Music Fair on Long Island in 1988. In 1996, The Best of the Danleers: The Mercury Years, was released; the compilation includes all of the group’s singles for Mercury, in addition to unreleased recordings.

== Members ==
Information regarding members culled from American Singing Groups: A History from 1940s to Today by Jay Warner.

- Jimmy Weston – lead vocals (1958–64; 1972–93) died June, 1993
- Johnny Lee – first tenor (1958–59; 1988)
- Willie Ephraim – second tenor (1958–59; 1988) died October 15, 1998
- Nat McCune – baritone (1958–59; 1972–93)
- Roosevelt Mays – bass (1958–59; 1988)
- Louis Williams – first tenor (1960–64)
- Doug Ebron – second tenor (1960–64; 1972) Died before 1988
- Terry Wilson – baritone (1960–64)
- Frankie Clemens – bass (1960–64)
- Bill Carey – baritone (1972–93) died September 12, 2016
- Robert Mirra - lead vocals (2012-)

== Discography ==
=== Compilation albums ===
List of studio albums
Year	Album details
1991	One Summer Night: Released: 1991; Label: Bear Family Records
1996	The Best of the Danleers: The Mercury Years: Released: 1996; Label: Mercury Records

=== Singles ===
List of singles, with selected chart positions
Title (A-side / B-side)	Year	Peak chart positions	
Title (A-side / B-side)	Year	US	US Black Singles
"One Summer Night" "Wheelin' and A-Dealin'"	1958	7 —	4 —
"I Really Love You" "My Flaming Heart"	1958	— —	— —
"Prelude to Love" "A Picture of You"	1958	— —	— —
"If You Don't Care" "(I Live) Half a Block From an Angel"	1960	— —	— —
"Foolish" "I'm Looking Around"	1961	— —	— —
"Baby You've Got It" "The Truth Hurts"	1964	— —	— —
"If" "Were You There"	1964	— —	— —
"Where Is Love" "The Angels Sent You"	1964	— —	— —
