= Hey Little Cobra =

1963 single by The Rip Chords

Single by the Rip Chords

from the album Hey Little Cobra and Other Hot Rod Hits
- B-side: "The Queen"
- Released: November 1963
- Recorded: October 15, 1963
- Genre: Hot rod rock, car song
- Length: 2:00
- Label: Columbia
- Songwriters: Carol Connors & Marshall H. Connors
- Producers: Terry Melcher & Bruce Johnston

The Rip Chords singles chronology
"Gone" (1963)	"Hey Little Cobra" (1963)	"Three Window Coupe" (1964)

Official audio
- "Hey Little Cobra" on YouTube

"Hey Little Cobra" is a song released in 1963 by the Rip Chords about the Shelby Cobra. The song was produced by Terry Melcher and Bruce Johnston, who also sang vocals.

The song spent 14 weeks on the Billboard Hot 100 chart, peaking at No. 4, while reaching No. 5 on Canada's CHUM Hit Parade and No. 3 on New Zealand's "Lever Hit Parade".

== Reception ==
Cash Box gave "Hey Little Cobra" a positive review, describing it as a "dandy thump'er that moves along at a quick, "Surf City" clip." In a retrospective review, William Ruhlmann of AllMusic also noted the song as "reminiscent of "Surf City."" and described it as "a pleasant artifact of its era".

== Personnel ==
- Terry Melcher – lead vocals, harmony and backing vocals, producer
- Bruce Johnston – harmony and backing vocals, producer

According to the AFM contract, the following musicians played on the track.

- Steve Douglas – saxophone
- Glen Campbell
- Ray Pohlman – bass
- Leon Russell – keyboards
- Frank Capp
- Hal Blaine – drums
- Bill Pitman
- Tommy Tedesco – guitar

== Chart performance ==
Chart (1963-64)	Peak position
Canada (CHUM Chart)	5
New Zealand (Lever Hit Parade)	3
US Billboard Hot 100	4
US Cash Box Top 100	4
