= Summer in Paradise =

Studio album by the Beach Boys
- Released: August 3, 1992
- Recorded: July 1991 – May 1992
- Genre: Rock
- Length: 44:10 (US); 41:15 (UK)
- Labels: Brother (US); EMI (UK)
- Producers: Terry Melcher (except "Forever" by John Stamos, Gary Griffin and Lanny Cardola)

The Beach Boys chronology
Lost & Found (1961–62) (1991)	Summer in Paradise (1992)	Good Vibrations: Thirty Years of The Beach Boys (1993)

Summer in Paradise (International version)

Singles from Summer in Paradise
- 1. "Hot Fun in the Summertime" Released: July 14, 1992; 2. "Forever" Released: 1992; 3. "Under the Boardwalk" Released: 1992; 4. "Summer in Paradise" Released: 1993; 5. "Summer of Love" Released: 1995

Summer in Paradise is the twenty-seventh studio album by American rock band the Beach Boys, released on August 3, 1992, by Brother Records. Produced by Terry Melcher, it is their only album made without the involvement of Brian Wilson, and has been regarded as the band's critical and commercial low point, failing to chart in either the US or UK and receiving unanimously negative reviews. In North America, it was the group's first album to be released only on CD and cassette, with a rare vinyl pressing released only in South Korea. The Beach Boys did not record another album of predominantly original material until That's Why God Made the Radio in 2012. Summer in Paradise was left out of Capitol's Beach Boys CD reissue campaign of 2000 to 2001, as well as all other reissues for most of the group's discography. Both it and its predecessor, Still Cruisin', are currently out of print.

== Composition ==
The conceptual idea behind the album's title song, co-written by Mike Love, was environmental protection, but the album was designed, in Love's words, to create, "the quintessential soundtrack of summer." With the exception of a new version of their 1970 track "Forever" and the new composition "Strange Things Happen", each song on the album deals thematically with the summer season. Of the album's twelve tracks, two songs are covers ("Hot Fun in the Summertime", originally by Sly & the Family Stone, and "Remember (Walking in the Sand)", originally by The Shangri-Las); two are new versions of older Beach Boys songs ("Surfin'" and "Forever", the latter with a vocal by John Stamos); one combines a classic song ("One Summer Night", originally by The Danleers) with a new Bruce Johnston song ("Slow Summer Dancin'"); and one takes an old song ("Under the Boardwalk," originally by The Drifters) and adds new lyrics. The rest are original songs, all containing both titular and lyrical references to summer and/or surfing, with the exception of the Transcendental Meditation-influenced "Strange Things Happen". The quasi-rap song "Summer of Love" was originally intended to be a duet with Bart Simpson for a planned Simpsons movie, but the Simpsons' producers turned down the offer. The song was instead used in an episode of Baywatch. Stamos performed the song "Forever" on several episodes of his sitcom Full House.

== Production ==
Summer in Paradise was one of the first albums to be recorded using the Pro Tools digital audio workstation, via a Beta version on a Macintosh Quadra computer. Musically, it continued in the vein of previous albums The Beach Boys and Still Cruisin' in its use of electronic instrumentation. The entire rhythm section was electronic on most songs, with all the drum parts being programmed (although not credited as such), and most of the bass parts were also synthesized. Former Beach Boys collaborator Van Dyke Parks played accordion on two tracks, and producer Terry Melcher contributed keyboard parts, with Al Jardine's son Adam singing backup vocals on the title track. Touring musician Adrian Baker sang backup but other regular members of the contemporary Beach Boys' touring band did not contribute to the album. Mike Love and Melcher were the main composers on the album, with Johnston being the only other member to contribute a new song. Jardine had allegedly been "suspended" from the band prior to the album's recording, supposedly because of a dispute about content; however, he returned during the sessions to sing lead vocals on two of the album's songs and contributed to the partial rerecording of tracks for the UK issue on EMI.

Different versions of six tracks appeared on the album's 1993 release in the United Kingdom. This included completely re-recorded and partially rewritten versions of "Island Fever" and "Summer in Paradise", the latter of which featured new lead vocals from Roger McGuinn on one verse. Carl Wilson's vocals on "Island Fever" had also been replaced with vocals by Al Jardine. "Strange Things Happen", "Remember (Walking in the Sand)", "Under the Boardwalk", and "Forever" were remixed and shortened, though the bridge of The Drifters' original version of "Under the Boardwalk" was recorded and added to the track's mix.

== Packaging ==
The artwork featured on the cover of this release, as well as the similar pieces that feature throughout the package, were painted by fellow Californian artist Robert Lyn Nelson. The original US front sleeve features the painting "Elements of the Universe", while the album gatefold includes further Nelson works, notably "Ring of Life" (used for the alternate UK pressing), "Embraced By the Sea", and "Amethyst Dawn at Kipahulu". The album packaging art direction and design by Spencer Drate with Judith Salavetz using the artwork of Robert Lyn Nelson on the multi-panels and CD disc.

== Promotion ==
"Hot Fun in the Summertime" was packaged with "Summer of Love" as the first and only commercial single released in promotion of the album, in July 1992. "Forever" was released as a promotional single to radio stations in the United States later in the year. The single provided three different mixes of the track: "AC Mix," "CHR Mix" and "CD Mix." The "CHR mix" was remixed by John Stamos and Gary Griffin and is a unique remix which differs from the US and UK album versions. Stamos helped give the album further promotion during the 1993 season of his hit television show, Full House; a poster for the album and CD are frequently shown in the studio where he hosts his daily radio show. Additionally, "Summer of Love" was also released as a promotional single in the United States in 1995, to tie in with the band's appearance on Baywatch that year.

== Reception ==
Professional ratings
Review scores
Source	Rating
AllMusic	1/5 stars
Blender	1/5 stars
The Encyclopedia of Popular Music	1/5 stars
Music Week	3/5 stars
Sputnikmusic	0.5/5

Summer in Paradise was received very poorly commercially and critically. The album is the only Beach Boys studio album that failed to make Billboard's Top Pop Albums chart; it reportedly sold fewer than 1,000 copies on its release, making it the Beach Boys album with by far the poorest commercial sales performance. The poor sales of the US release reportedly contributed to independent distributor Navarre becoming bankrupt. Navarre and EMI each only issued one print run of the album on CD. It has been out of print since its initial release and has since become a collector's item. A large number of unsold copies of the album were unloaded when the QVC network bundled them with the Good Vibrations: Thirty Years of the Beach Boys CD box set in 1993. Other copies were soon destroyed following the album's severe commercial failure.

Andrew G. Doe and John Tobler, authors of The Complete Guide to the Music of The Beach Boys, described Summer in Paradise as, "the absolute nadir of their recording career." In an online interview, Doe said he had to listen to the album three times while writing the book, "which has probably scarred me for life." William Ruhlmann of AllMusic said the band had deteriorated under Love's leadership to become "a pointless parody of themselves" by "writing bad new songs [and] recording bad covers of old songs". Douglas Wolk of Blender called the album "...a train wreck. Misbegotten attempts to sound 'modern'...appear next to leaden lounge-act covers." He also called the re-recording of "Surfin'" "horrifying".

== Legacy ==
While the album's title track is the only song from the album that has remained a concert staple of the band, "Under the Boardwalk" and the new version of "Surfin'" have also been performed, and "Summer of Love" and "Strange Things Happen" were each played on one occasion in the 1990s. For two decades, Summer in Paradise was the Beach Boys' last album of predominantly original material. In June 2012, the Beach Boys next and final album of original songs, That's Why God Made the Radio was released, featuring all-new material from the surviving members.

== Track listing ==
=== Original US release (1992) ===
No.	Title	Writer(s)	Lead Vocals	Length
1.	"Hot Fun in the Summertime"	Sylvester Stewart	Mike Love and Carl Wilson	3:29
2.	"Surfin'"	Brian Wilson, Mike Love	Mike Love and Carl Wilson	3:45
3.	"Summer of Love"	Mike Love, Terry Melcher	Mike Love	2:51
4.	"Island Fever"	Love, Melcher	Love and Carl Wilson	3:27
5.	"Still Surfin'"	Love, Melcher	Love	4:03
6.	"Slow Summer Dancin' (One Summer Night)"	Bruce Johnston, Danny Webb	Bruce Johnston and Al Jardine	3:23
7.	"Strange Things Happen"	Love, Melcher	Love and Jardine	4:42
8.	"Remember (Walking in the Sand)"	George Morton	Carl Wilson	3:31
9.	"Lahaina Aloha"	Love, Melcher	Love and Carl Wilson	3:44
10.	"Under the Boardwalk"	Artie Resnick, Kenny Young, Love	Love and Carl Wilson	4:07
11.	"Summer in Paradise"	Love, Melcher, Craig Fall	Love	3:52
12.	"Forever" (with John Stamos)	Dennis Wilson, Gregg Jakobson	John Stamos	3:02

=== Original UK release (1993) ===
No.	Title	Writer(s)	Lead Vocals	Length
1.	"Hot Fun in the Summertime"	Sylvester Stewart	Mike Love and Carl Wilson	3:29
2.	"Surfin'"	Brian Wilson, Mike Love	Mike Love and Carl Wilson	3:45
3.	"Summer of Love"	Mike Love, Terry Melcher	Mike Love	2:51
4.	"Island Fever" (re-recorded and partially rewritten)	Love, Melcher	Love and Al Jardine	3:10
5.	"Still Surfin'"	Love, Melcher	Love	4:03
6.	"Slow Summer Dancin' (One Summer Night)"	Bruce Johnston, Danny Webb	Bruce Johnston and Jardine	3:23
7.	"Strange Things Happen" (remixed and edited)	Love, Melcher	Love and Jardine	3:18
8.	"Remember (Walking in the Sand)" (remixed and edited)	George Morton	Carl Wilson	3:05
9.	"Lahaina Aloha"	Love, Melcher	Love and Carl Wilson	3:44
10.	"Under the Boardwalk" (partially re-recorded, edited, and remixed)	Artie Resnick, Kenny Young	Love, Carl Wilson and Jardine	3:30
11.	"Summer in Paradise" (re-recorded and partially rewritten; with Roger McGuinn)	Love, Melcher, Craig Fall	Love and Roger McGuinn	3:28
12.	"Forever" (remixed and edited; with John Stamos)	Dennis Wilson, Gregg Jakobson	John Stamos	3:00

== Personnel ==
Personnel taken from the album's liner notes.

The Beach Boys

- Mike Love – vocals; executive producer
- Carl Wilson – vocals
- Alan Jardine – vocals
- Bruce Johnston – vocals, keyboards

Additional personnel

- John Stamos – vocals and production on “Forever”
- Terry Melcher – additional backing vocals, keyboards; producer (all except "Forever")
- Adrian Baker – additional backing vocals
- Adam Christian Jardine – additional backing vocals
- Keith Wechsler – keyboards, keyboard programming, drums on "Island Fever" and "Still Surfin'"; engineer (all except "Forever"), mixing
- Craig Fall – electric and acoustic guitars, mandolins, keyboard bass
- Sammy Merendino – drums
- Rod Clark – bass
- Van Dyke Parks – accordains, additional keyboards
- Danny Kortchmar – additional electric and acoustic guitars
- Joel Peskin – saxophones
- John Weston – pedal steel guitar
- Sal Marullo – congas on "Island Fever"
- Richard Titus – keyboard programming; second engineer
- Gary Griffin – accordion on "Forever"; production on "Forever"
- Roger McGuinn – vocals and 12-string guitar on "Summer in Paradise" (UK version only)
- Kevin Elson – engineer on "Forever"
- Mike Mierua – engineer on "Forever"
- Lanny Cordola – production on "Forever"
