= Terry Melcher =

American record producer (1942–2004)

- Melcher in 1969
- Born: Terrence Paul Jorden; February 8, 1942; New York City, U.S.
- Died: November 19, 2004 (aged 62); Beverly Hills, California, U.S.
- Other name: Terry Day
- Spouses: Melissa E. Brown (m. 1974; div. 1977) Jacqueline Carlin (m. 1982; div. 1997) Terese Edwards (m. 1998)
- Relatives: Doris Day (mother); Al Jorden (father); Ryan Melcher (son)
- Musical career
- Genres: Rock; pop
- Occupations: Record producer; songwriter; singer

Terrence Paul Melcher (né Jorden; February 8, 1942 – November 19, 2004) was an American record producer, singer, and songwriter who was instrumental in shaping the mid-to-late 1960s California sound and folk rock movements. His best-known contributions were producing the Byrds' first two albums Mr. Tambourine Man (1965) and Turn! Turn! Turn! (1965) as well as most of the hit recordings of Paul Revere & the Raiders and Gentle Soul. He is also known for his collaboration with Bruce Johnston and for his association with the Manson Family.

Melcher was the only child of actress/singer Doris Day. His father was Day's first husband Al Jorden, and he was adopted by her third husband Martin Melcher. Most of his early recordings were with the vocal surf acts the Rip Chords and Bruce & Terry. In the 1960s, Melcher was acquainted with the Beach Boys and later produced several singles for the group in the 1980s and the 1990s, including "Kokomo" (1988), which topped U.S. record charts.

== Background ==
Terrence Paul Jorden was born in New York City to singer/actress Doris Day and her first husband, trombonist Al Jorden. Known as "Terry", the boy was named by his mother after the hero of her favorite childhood comic strip, Terry and the Pirates.

Before his birth, Day was planning to divorce Al Jorden because of his violent temper and alleged physical abuse. Jorden responded to his wife's pregnancy by demanding that she get an abortion. Shortly after giving birth, Day filed for divorce and left the infant with her mother in Ohio while she went back to touring with big band-leader Les Brown. After the divorce, Jorden visited his son infrequently and had little presence in his life.

After divorcing her second husband, saxophonist George Weidler, Day married Martin Melcher, who would become her manager and produce many of her films. Melcher adopted Terry and gave him his surname. In his freshman and sophomore years of high school, Terry attended the Loomis Chaffee School in Connecticut. He then returned to California for his junior and senior years at Beverly Hills High School, and subsequently attended Principia College in Illinois for a short time.

== Early career ==
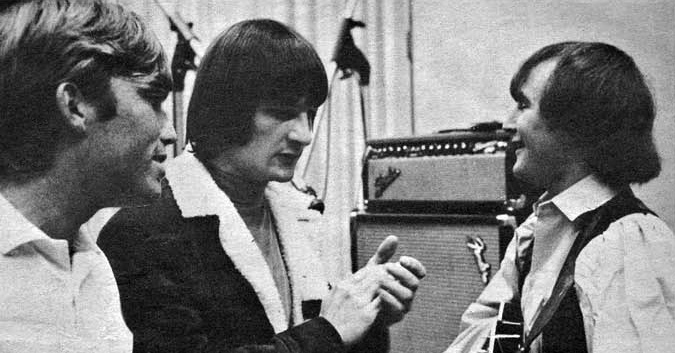
Melcher (left) in the studio with the Byrds' Gene Clark (center) and David Crosby in 1965

Melcher has been credited with helping to shape the sound of 1960s surf music in California. In the early 1960s, Melcher and Bruce Johnston formed the vocal duet Bruce & Terry. The duo had hits like "Custom Machine" and "Summer Means Fun". Melcher and Johnston also created another group, The Rip Chords, which had a Top 10 hit with "Hey Little Cobra". Later, Johnston would join the Beach Boys.

By the mid-1960s, Melcher had joined the staff of Columbia Records and went on to work with the Byrds. He produced their hit cover versions of Bob Dylan's "Mr. Tambourine Man" and Pete Seeger's "Turn! Turn! Turn!", as well as the corresponding albums Mr. Tambourine Man and Turn! Turn! Turn!

Following conflicts with the band and their manager, Melcher was replaced as producer by Allen Stanton and then Gary Usher, although he would work with the Byrds again on their Ballad of Easy Rider, (Untitled) and Byrdmaniax albums. Melcher also worked with Paul Revere & the Raiders, Wayne Newton, Frankie Laine, Jimmy Boyd, Pat Boone, Glen Campbell, Mark Lindsay and the Mamas & the Papas. He was instrumental in signing Los Angeles band the Rising Sons, led by Taj Mahal and Ry Cooder.

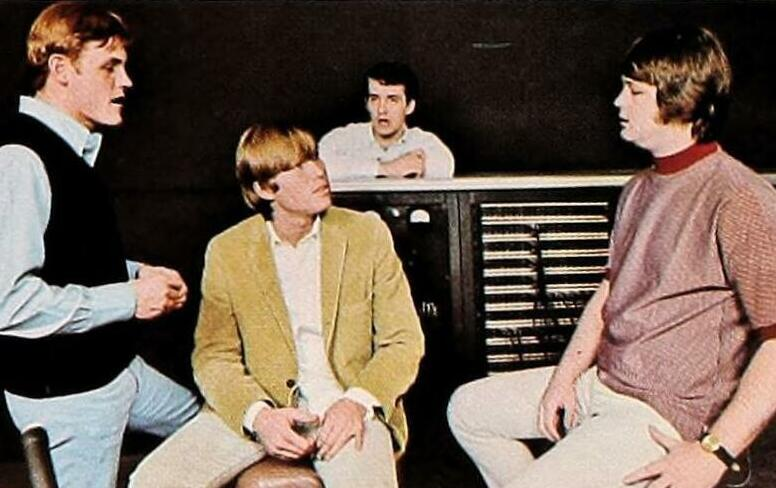
Melcher (center) with Bruce Johnston (left), Brian Wilson (right), and Tony Asher (back) in early 1966

Melcher played the tambourine on the Pet Sounds track "Here Today"; he may also have played the tambourine on "That's Not Me," though this is uncertain. The tambourine on that session has been attributed to either Alan Jardine or Melcher, with Brian Wilson naming the latter on at least one occasion.

He was a board member of the Monterey Pop Foundation and a producer of the Monterey Pop Festival in 1967.

== Manson Family ==
In 1968, Beach Boy Dennis Wilson introduced Melcher to ex-con and aspiring musician Charles Manson. Manson and his "family" had been living in Wilson's house at 14400 Sunset Boulevard after Wilson had picked up hitchhiking Manson family members Patricia Krenwinkel and Ella Jo Bailey. Wilson expressed interest in Manson's music and also recorded two of Manson's songs with the Beach Boys. For a time, Melcher was interested in recording Manson's music as well as making a film about the family and their hippie commune existence. Manson met Melcher at 10050 Cielo Drive, the home that Melcher shared with his girlfriend, actress Candice Bergen and musician Mark Lindsay.

Manson eventually auditioned for Melcher but Melcher declined to sign him. There was still talk of a documentary being made about Manson's music but Melcher abandoned the project after witnessing Manson fighting with a drunken stuntman at Spahn Ranch. Wilson and Melcher severed their ties with Manson, a move that angered Manson. Soon after, Melcher and Bergen moved out of the Cielo Drive home. The house's owner, Rudi Altobelli, then leased it to film director Roman Polanski and his wife, actress Sharon Tate. Manson was reported to have visited the house on more than one occasion asking for Melcher but was told that Melcher had moved.

On August 8–9, 1969, the house was the site of the murders of Tate (who was eight months pregnant at the time), coffee heiress Abigail Folger, hairdresser Jay Sebring, writer Wojciech Frykowski, and Steven Parent by members of Manson's "family". Some authors and law enforcement personnel have theorized that the Cielo Drive house was targeted by Manson as revenge for Melcher's rejection, and that Manson was unaware that he and Bergen had moved out. However, family member Charles "Tex" Watson stated that Manson and company did, in fact, know that Melcher was no longer living there. Melcher's former roommate Mark Lindsay stated that "Terry and I talked about it later, and Terry said Manson knew (that Melcher had moved) because Manson or someone from his organization left a note on Terry's porch in Malibu."

At that time, Melcher was producing music by singer Jimmy Boyd for A&M Records. After initial tracks were recorded, the Manson murders occurred, reportedly prompting Melcher to go into seclusion and the session was never completed. When Manson was arrested, it was widely reported that he had sent his followers to the house to kill Melcher and Bergen. Manson family member Susan Atkins, who admitted her part in the murders, stated to police and before a grand jury that the house was chosen as the scene for the murders "to instill fear into Terry Melcher, because Terry had given us his word on a few things and never came through with them". Melcher took to employing a bodyguard and told Manson prosecutor Vincent Bugliosi that his fear was so great he had been undergoing psychiatric treatment. Melcher was described as the most frightened of the witnesses at the trial, even though Bugliosi assured him that "Manson knew you were no longer living [on Cielo Drive]".

In his 2019 book CHAOS: Charles Manson, the CIA, and the Secret History of the Sixties, author Tom O'Neill re‑examined the Manson case and found evidence that Melcher may have been more closely involved with the Manson family than he had admitted at trial. In reviewing police files and other data, O'Neill found evidence that Melcher was associating with Manson during the four month period after the Tate-Labianca murders, but before Manson was arrested. Bugliosi had seemingly hidden these documents, which undermined claims that the Tate murders had been intended to frighten Melcher, and as revenge for his refusal to record Manson's music. O'Neill also found documents indicating Melcher was having sex with a 15-year-old Manson family member, Ruth Ann Moorehouse. Dean Moorehouse – Ruth Ann's father and a Manson Family member – had also resided at 10050 Cielo Drive with Melcher. Tex Watson was known to frequently visit the residence.

== Later years ==
Melcher again acted as producer for the Byrds on Ballad of Easy Rider, their eighth album, released in November 1969. The record peaked at No. 36 on the Billboard charts. At the time it was met with mixed reviews but is today regarded as one of the band's stronger efforts from the latter half of their career.

In the early 1970s, Melcher produced the Byrds' 9th and 10th albums (Untitled) and Byrdmaniax. However, Byrdmaniax was not well-received; band member Gene Parsons referred to the album as "Melcher's Folly" because of its prominent overdubs of horns and strings, which were done without the band's knowledge. During this time, Melcher dabbled in real estate and served as the executive producer of his mother's CBS series, The Doris Day Show. He later recorded two solo albums, Terry Melcher and Royal Flush. Writing of the former in Christgau's Record Guide: Rock Albums of the Seventies (1981), Robert Christgau said:

Most will find this producer's daydream sterile at best and noxious at worst but I like the song about his shrink and am fascinated by his compulsion to defend his Manson connections. With the requisite show of wealth and taste, he insists that he's only a spectator — why, he wouldn't even know about the hand jive if it weren't for Soul Train. Alternate title: It's Alright Ma, I'm Only Watching.

In 1985, Melcher co-produced the cable show Doris Day's Best Friends and worked as the director and vice president of the Doris Day Animal Foundation. He and his mother, to whom he remained close throughout his life, also co-owned the Cypress Inn, a small hotel in Carmel-by-the-Sea, California.

In 1988, Melcher earned a Golden Globe nomination for co-writing the song "Kokomo" with John Phillips, Scott McKenzie, and Mike Love. Recorded by the Beach Boys, the song was featured in the 1988 Tom Cruise film Cocktail and hit No. 1 (the band's career fourth overall) on the Billboard Hot 100. The single was certified gold with U.S. sales of more than one million copies. Melcher later co-wrote and produced the band's 1992 studio album Summer in Paradise, which was the first record produced digitally on Pro Tools.

== Death ==
On November 19, 2004, Melcher died at his home in Beverly Hills, California, following a long battle with melanoma.

== Discography ==
Singles
Act	Release	Catalogue	Year	Notes #
Terry Day	"That's All I Want" / "I Waited Too Long"	Columbia 4-42427	1962	
Terry Day	"Be A Soldier" / "I Love You, Betty"	Columbia 4-42678	1963	
Terry Melcher & Bruce Johnston	"Take It To Mexico (Tulsa County Blue)" / "Rebecca"	RCA Victor NB-10238	1975	
Terry Melcher	"Fire In A Rainstorm" / "So Right Tonight"	RCA Victor NB-10587	1976	
