= Bruce Johnston =

American musician (born 1942)

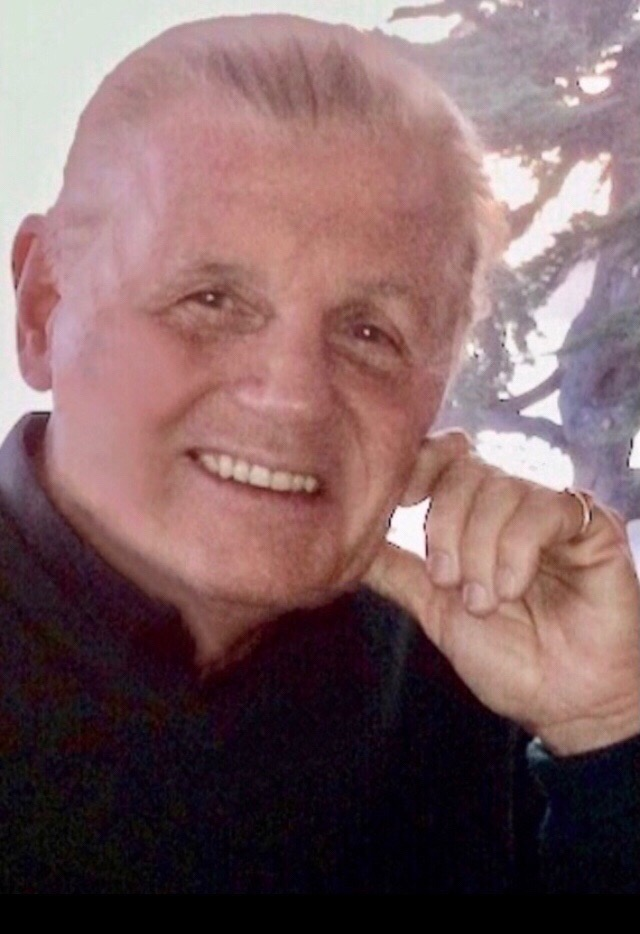
- Johnston in 2021
- Born: Benjamin Baldwin; June 27, 1942 (age 84); Peoria, Illinois, U.S.
- Occupations: Singer; songwriter; musician; producer
- Years active: 1957–present
- Spouse: Harriet Johnston (m. 1976)
- Children: 4
- Musical career
- Genres: Rock; pop; classical
- Instruments: Vocals; keyboards; bass guitar
- Labels: Brother; Capitol; Columbia; Del-Fi; Reprise
- Formerly of: The Beach Boys; Bruce & Terry; California Music; The Gamblers; The Rip Chords

Bruce Johnston (born Benjamin Baldwin; June 27, 1942) is an American singer, songwriter, musician and record producer, best known as a former member of the Beach Boys. He also collaborated on many records with Terry Melcher (his bandmate in Bruce & Terry, the Rip Chords, and California Music) and composed the 1975 David Cassidy and Barry Manilow hit "I Write the Songs", which was first recorded by Captain & Tennille and later by Johnston himself.

Born in Illinois, Johnston grew up in Los Angeles and studied classical piano in his early years. While in high school, he arranged and played on his first hit record, Sandy Nelson's "Teen Beat" (1959), and also worked with musicians such as Kim Fowley and Phil Spector. One of Johnston's first gigs was as a member of the surf band the Gamblers before becoming a staff producer at Columbia Records.

In 1965, Johnston joined the Beach Boys for live performances, initially filling in for the group's co-founder Brian Wilson. Johnston's first appearance on the band's records was as a vocalist on "California Girls" (1965). He later contributed original material to the group's albums, including "The Nearest Faraway Place" on 20/20 (1969), "Tears in the Morning" and "Deirdre" on Sunflower (1970), and "Disney Girls (1957)" on Surf's Up (1971).

Johnston left the Beach Boys in 1972 and recorded one solo album, Going Public (1977). In late 1978, he rejoined the Beach Boys to co-produce the band's L.A. (Light Album) (1979). He continued to tour as a member of the band until his departure in 2026.

== Background ==
Born in Peoria, Illinois, in 1942 at the Florence Crittenton Home, Johnston's original name was Benjamin Baldwin. He was adopted as a child by William and Irene Johnston of Chicago and grew up in the wealthy Los Angeles neighborhoods of Brentwood and Bel-Air. His adoptive family is of Irish descent, with his grandparents hailing from Markethill, County Armagh. His adoptive father was president of the Owl Rexall Drug Company in Los Angeles after moving from Walgreens in Chicago.

Johnston attended the private Bel Air Town and Country School (later renamed John Thomas Dye School) and the University of California, Los Angeles. He also studied classical piano in his early years, training at Interlochen Arts Camp as a youth.

== Early career ==
Appearing on the Tom Moffatt Show, 1963

In high school, Johnston switched to contemporary music. He performed in a few "beginning" bands during this time and then moved on to working with young musicians such as Sandy Nelson, Kim Fowley, and Phil Spector. Soon, Johnston began backing people such as Ritchie Valens, the Everly Brothers, and Eddie Cochran.

In 1959, while still in high school, Johnston arranged and played on his first hit record, "Teen Beat" by Sandy Nelson. The single reached the Billboard Top Ten. The same year, Johnston made his first single under his own name, "Take This Pearl" on Arwin Records (a record label owned by Doris Day) as part of the Bruce & Jerry duo (Jerry Cooper was a high school friend of Bruce's). The teenage Hot Rod film entitled "Ghost of Dragstrip Hollow" (1959), features the song "I Promise You" by Johnston and Judy Harriet. In 1960, he was with The Gamblers (surf band) and played keyboards on their World Pacific record "Moon Dawg" (World Pacific X-815), purportedly the first actual surf instrumental.

In 1960, Johnston started his record production career at Del-Fi Records, producing five singles and an album – Love You So – by Ron Holden (many of the album's eleven tracks were written or co-written by Johnston).

In 1962 and 1963, Johnston continued his recording career with a series of surfin' singles (vocal & instrumental) and an album, Surfin' 'Round the World, credited to Bruce Johnston, and another "live" album, the Bruce Johnston Surfin' Band's Surfer's Pajama Party. In 1963 came the first collaboration with his friend Terry Melcher (Doris Day's son), a mostly instrumental covers album credited to the Hot Doggers.

The first artist that Johnston and Melcher produced was a group called the Rip Chords. The pair were then working as staff producers at Columbia Records, Hollywood, and by the time they were producing the million-selling "Hey Little Cobra", a knock-off of the Beach Boys car song vocal style, they also wound up singing every layered vocal part for the recording. The two of them made a few recordings as Bruce & Terry and the Rogues, but Melcher began to focus more on his production career (with the Byrds, Paul Revere & the Raiders).

== Original tenure with the Beach Boys ==
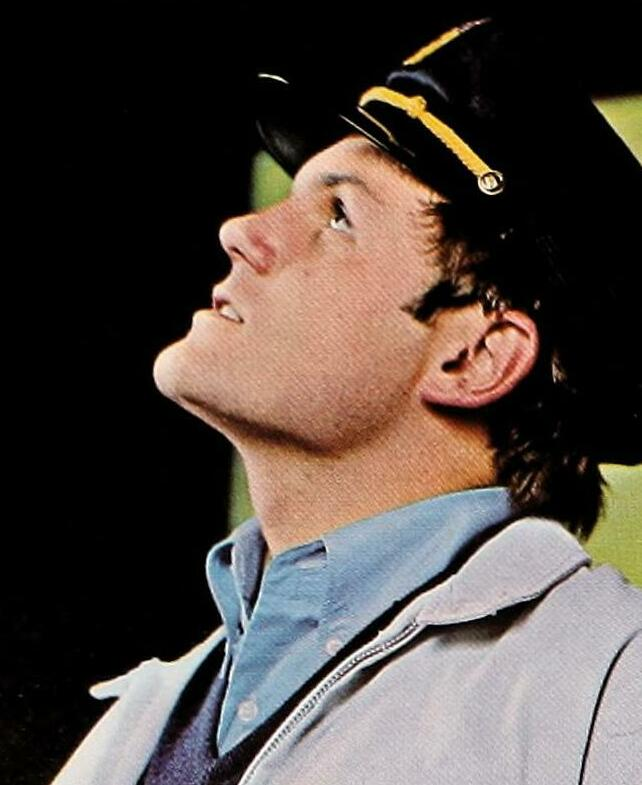
Johnston in 1966

On April 9, 1965, Johnston joined the Beach Boys in New Orleans, filling in for Glen Campbell, who briefly served as a touring member for Brian Wilson, and had declined an offer to officially join the band. Campbell played his last show as a Beach Boy on May 15, 1965 and Johnston then became a full-time replacement for Brian Wilson on the road. Johnston did not start playing bass until his first tenure with the Beach Boys. The first contributions he made to recordings as one of the Beach Boys was on Summer Days (And Summer Nights!!). For contractual reasons, however, he was not credited on a Beach Boys album cover until Wild Honey (1967) though he was photographed as a touring band member on the back sleeve of Pet Sounds (1966).

In May 1966, Johnston flew to London and played Pet Sounds (1966) for John Lennon, Paul McCartney, and Keith Moon. He had provided backing vocals to six of the album's 13 tracks: "Wouldn't It Be Nice", "You Still Believe in Me", "That's Not Me", "God Only Knows" (also co-lead), "Sloop John B", and "I Just Wasn't Made for These Times". He similarly contributed backing vocals to some of the subsequent Smile sessions. In early 1967, Wilson discussed the extent of his personal relationship with Johnston to Melody Maker: "I'm afraid I only know Bruce superficially. [...] I only see him at recording sessions. [...] He's a very likeable person."

Johnston did not participate in most of the 1967 Smiley Smile sessions and played on only a few tracks on Wild Honey. Reflecting on Smiley Smile, Johnston said it was "a thousand times better than the [original Smile] [...] It's just the most underrated album in the whole catalog for me." He had an unfavorable opinion of the band's 1968 album Friends, calling the songs "wimpy". The Beach Boys asked touring member Billy Hinsche to permanently replace Johnston in mid-1969, although Hinsche elected to focus on his studies at UCLA and Johnston was not aware of the offer at the time.

Starting with the instrumental "The Nearest Faraway Place" from 20/20 (1969), Johnston's original compositions began appearing on the band's records. Johnston considered his favorite Beach Boys album to be Sunflower (1970). In a 1970s interview, he described it as the last true Beach Boys album because, in his belief, it was the last to feature Wilson's input and active involvement. He nonetheless regretted the inclusion of his two songs, saying that "Tears in the Morning" was "too pop" and that "I wish I hadn't recorded ['Deirdre'] with the group."

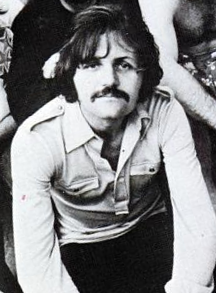
Johnston with the Beach Boys, 1971

Surf's Up (1971) included Johnston's most notable written composition for the band, "Disney Girls (1957)", which was subsequently recorded by, among others, Cass Elliot, Captain & Tennille, Art Garfunkel, Jack Jones, and Doris Day. From a performance standpoint, he later cited 1971 as his favorite year of the group musically because their set lists focused on newer songs. He also criticized Surf's Up as "a hyped-up lie." His final contribution before departing consisted of backing vocals on their 1972 song "Marcella".

In 1972, Johnston left the Beach Boys. Manager Jack Rieley said he dismissed Johnston at the request of the Wilson brothers. Brian told an interviewer, "All I know is he got into a horrible fight with Jack Rieley. Some dispute, and they got into a horrible fight, and the next day Bruce was gone." Dennis Wilson said, "There's less tension since Bruce left. [...] Musically, we didn't click [and] appreciate each other, so one day we both said, 'OK, that's it.' He's a good guy but he was writing stuff for a solo album. [...] We're a band." Mike Love stated, "It was very amicable. The Beach Boys never threw him out. He was just on a tangent that was outside The Beach Boys for so many years." Johnston himself said that he quit the band partly due to his unhappiness with Brian's creative withdrawal from the group. Later, in 1974, he said that he departed because he "didn't want to go on singing oldies for the rest of my life" and was "too frustrated being [considered as] a fifth of something – which was what I was with the Beach Boys."

== Solo career and return to the Beach Boys ==
Although he was no longer an official member of the band, Johnston continued to make occasional appearances on their albums from the mid-1970s. Concurrently, he embarked on a solo career. In 1977, he released his third solo album Going Public, which included among its tracks Johnston's own recording of "I Write the Songs" as well as a disco remake of his 1970 Beach Boys song "Deirdre". Johnston would also score a hit off the album on the disco charts with a dance-oriented remake of the Chantays' hit "Pipeline" after the recording was popularized by Manhattan-based underground DJ David Mancuso.

At the end of 1978, Johnston rejoined the Beach Boys at Brian Wilson's request to appear on (and co-produce) the album L.A. (Light Album). The following year he was credited as sole producer on the follow-up LP, Keepin' the Summer Alive. Johnston remained with the Beach Boys and was the only member to continue touring with Mike Love as the Beach Boys full-time after the death of Carl Wilson in 1998.

Biographer Peter Ames Carlin approached Johnston during the writing of the 2006 book Catch a Wave: The Rise, Fall and Redemption of the Beach Boys' Brian Wilson. However, Johnston was reluctant to be interviewed and only offered a few comments via e-mail. According to Carlin, Johnston remarked at one point, "I can tell that you are far deeper into the Beach Boys thing than I will ever be in 100 lifetimes! It's only business to me."

In 2011, Love and Johnston reunited with Brian Wilson, Al Jardine and David Marks for a new Beach Boys album, That's Why God Made the Radio, and a 50th anniversary tour, which began in April 2012. The tour ended in September 2012, amidst rumors that Love had fired Wilson, Jardine and Marks from the band; after which Love and Johnston continued touring without them.

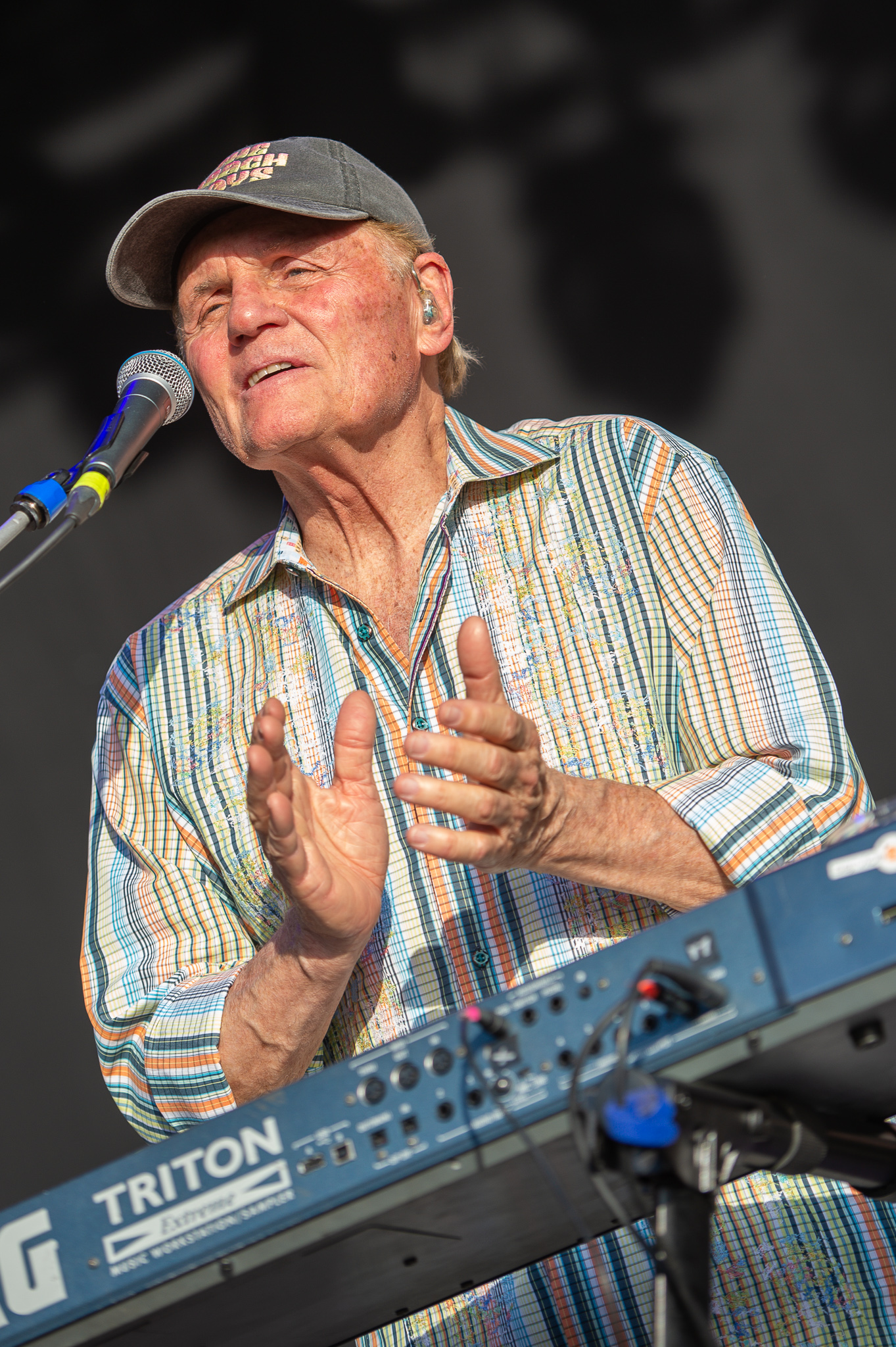
Johnston with the Beach Boys in 2019

Johnston still retains his equal ownership of the band's ASCAP publishing company, Wilojarston, and is the only member of the band to have earned a Grammy Award for Song of the Year.

On March 4, 2026, Johnston announced that he was quitting the Beach Boys again in order to focus on his solo career, though said that he would appear with the band on special occasions.

On October 11, 2026, Johnston, along with Marks, Dean Torrence and Marilyn Wilson, made a guest appearance with Jardine and the Pet Sounds Band at their concert in Cerritos, California. This was Johnston's first performance with Jardine since 2014, and with Marks since 2016.

== Other work ==
In 1967, Johnston sang on "My World Fell Down", a minor hit for the Gary Usher-led studio group Sagittarius.

In the mid-1970s, he wrote "I Write the Songs", which was originally recorded by Captain & Tennille. The song became a Billboard number one hit by Barry Manilow, for which Johnston won a Grammy Award for Song of the Year in 1977. "I Write the Songs" would go on to be recorded by over two hundred artists, including Frank Sinatra, among others. Regarding the Grammy win, Johnston stated: "How can I get a Grammy for a song that I wrote in my car and The Beach Boys, Brian Wilson and Mike Love have not won? Why is fate being so uncool?"

In 1977, Johnston provided vocal arrangements and sang back-up vocals on Eric Carmen's LP Boats Against the Current and can be heard on the hit single "She Did It", with inspiration taken from the 1968 Beach Boys' hit "Do It Again". Additionally, during this period Johnston wrote backing vocal arrangements and also sang on the recordings for Elton John including "Don't Let the Sun Go Down on Me". He also contributed vocals to several songs on Pink Floyd's album The Wall, most notably in the song "The Show Must Go On", which Roger Waters specifically wrote for Beach Boys-style vocal harmonies.

Johnston is one of the producers of The Weeknd's album Dawn FM (2022), in which he wrote and co-produced "Here We Go... Again" featuring rapper Tyler, the Creator.

== Personal life ==
Johnston married Harriet Johnston in 1976 and has four sons. He described himself as "a real conservative guy" and stated that he had never taken drugs other than alcohol in his life.

Politically, he identified as a Republican as of 2012. He was subjected to criticism during the band's 50th anniversary tour, when a fan video during a meet and greet caught him being critical of then-US President Barack Obama, as well as 2012 Republican presidential nominee, Mitt Romney.

== Discography ==
=== Solo ===
Albums

Year	Album details
June 1962	Surfers' Pajama Party: Released: June 1962; Label: Del-Fi Records; Tracks: "Surfer's Delight"; "Kansas City"; "Mashin' the Popeye"; "Gee But I'm Lonesome"; "Green Onions"; "Ramrod"; "Last Night"; "Surfer Stomp"; "What'd I Say"; "Something On Your Mind"
July 1963	Surfin' Round the World: Released: July 1963; Label: Columbia Records; Tracks: "Surfin' Round the World"; "Maksha at Midnight"; "Down Under"; "Cape Town"; "Biarritz"; "Jersey Channel Islands, Pt. 7"; "The Hamptons"; "Virginia Beach"; "Surf-A-Nova"; "Hot Pastrami, Mashed Potatoes, Come on to Rincon-Yeah!!"; "Malibu"; "Surfin's Here to Stay"
May 1977	Going Public: Released: May 1977; Label: Columbia Records; Tracks: "I Write the Songs"; "Deirdre"; "Thank You Baby"; "Rendezvous"; "Won't Somebody Dance With Me"; "Disney Girls (1957)"; "Rock and Roll Survivor"; "Don't Be Scared"; "Pipeline"

Singles

Date of release	Title	Label	Chart positions
February 1962	"Do the Surfer Stomp (Part One)"/"Do the Surfer Stomp (Part Two)"	Donna	never charted
April 1962	"Soupy Shuffle Stomp"/"Moon Shot"	Donna	never charted
March 1963	"The Original Surfer Stomp"/"Pajama Party"	Del-Fi	never charted
August 1977 (UK)	"Pipeline"/"Disney Girls"	CBS Records	#33 (UK)
September 1977	"Pipeline"/"Disney Girls" + "Pipeline"/"Deirdre" (12")	Columbia Records	never charted
1977	"Rendezvous"/"I Write the Songs"	Columbia Records	never charted

=== with the Beach Boys ===
- 1965: Summer Days (And Summer Nights!!)
- 1965: Beach Boys' Party!
- 1966: Pet Sounds
- 1967: Smiley Smile
- 1967: Wild Honey
- 1968: Friends
- 1969: 20/20
- 1970: Sunflower
- 1971: Surf's Up
- 1972: Carl and the Passions – "So Tough" ("Marcella" only)
- 1979: L.A. (Light Album)
- 1980: Keepin' the Summer Alive
- 1985: The Beach Boys
- 1989: Still Cruisin'
- 1992: Summer in Paradise
- 1996: Stars and Stripes Vol. 1
- 2012: That's Why God Made the Radio

=== with Mike Love ===
- 1998: Salute NASCAR (along with David Marks)
- 2001: Summertime Cruisin'
- 2017: Unleash the Love
- 2018: Reason for the Season
- 2019: 12 Sides of Summer

=== Songs (written or co-written) ===
- Three Window Coupe (1964)
  - "Beach Girl" (with Terry Melcher)
- Hey Little Cobra and Other Hot Rod Hits (1964)
  - "The Queen" (with Ray Colcord, Terry Melcher)
  - "Trophy Machine" (with Terry Melcher)
  - "Gone" (with Terry Melcher)
  - "'40 Ford Time" (with Terry Melcher)
  - "Bunny Hill" (with Terry Melcher, S. Stewart)
- Wild Honey (1967)
  - "How She Boogalooed It"
- 20/20 (1969)
  - "The Nearest Faraway Place"
- Sunflower (1970)
  - "Deirdre" (with Brian Wilson)
  - "Tears in the Morning"
- Surf's Up (1971)
  - "Disney Girls (1957)"
- California Music
  - "Ten Years Harmony" (single) (1974)
- Going Public (1977) (That are not on Beach Boys albums)
  - "I Write the Songs"
  - "Thank You, Baby"
  - "Rendezvous" (with Bill Hudson, Brett Hudson, Mark Hudson)
  - "Rock and Roll Survivor"
  - "Don't Be Scared"
- Keepin' the Summer Alive (1980)
  - "Endless Harmony"
- The Beach Boys (1985)
  - "She Believes in Love Again"
- Still Cruisin' (1989)
  - "Somewhere Near Japan"
- Summer in Paradise (1992)
  - "Slow Summer Dancin' (One Summer Night)"
- The Best Of Bruce & Terry (1998)
  - "Don't Run Away" (with Mike Love)
  - "I Love You Model "T"" (with Terry Melcher)
  - "Roger's Reef" (with Terry Melcher)
  - "Yeah!" (with Terry Melcher)
  - "Thank You Baby" (with Denie Dudley)
- Dawn FM (2022)
  - "Here We Go... Again" (with the Weeknd, Tyler, the Creator, Masamune Kudo, Christian Love, Brian Kennedy, Benny Bock, Charlie Coffeen)
- The Teammates (2022)
  - "Just Keep It Up" (with Terry Melcher, Dean Torrence)
  - "Love Lace" (with Terry Melcher, Dean Torrence)

=== Other appearances ===
- A Postcard from California by Al Jardine (2010) (Johnston along with The Beach Boys provide backing vocals on the song "Don't Fight the Sea")
- Islands in the Sun EP by Al Jardine (2025) (Johnston provides backing vocals on the album's title track)
