= Pat DiCesare =

- Born: Patrick James DiCesare Sr. April 12, 1938; Trafford, Pennsylvania
- Occupation: concert promoter
- Years active: 1950s – 1999

Pat J. DiCesare Sr. (born April 12, 1938) is an American entrepreneur and rock concert promoter, whose career began at the early stages of rock and roll. His career in the music industry spanned the latter half of the 20th century, and his Pittsburgh-based company, DiCesare Engler Productions, was at one time one of the top-grossing businesses amongst US concert promoters.

== Early life ==
DiCesare was born in Trafford, Pennsylvania into a family of 9 siblings. His father emigrated from Italy and settled in Trafford to work for Westinghouse Electric. After graduating from Trafford High School, DiCesare took a job with Westinghouse in nearby East Pittsburgh. He left his job just months later to work as a record distributor for Tim Tormey, a concert promoter and talent agent in the Pittsburgh area^{1}.

== 1950s ==
As a teenager, DiCesare wrote songs and performed in a doo wop band with a group of friends called "The Penn Boys". He wrote, produced, and released his first single in 1957, "Gonna Have a Party," which was performed by The Penn Boys. He also wrote "I'm Spinning" and "You Say You Love Me," which were originally released on Fee Bee Records in 1957. They were recorded by the Del Vikings just after they had released their 2 Gold record singles "Come Go with Me" and "Whispering Bells" on Dot Records. In 1958, he started Bobby records, named after his first recording artist Bobby Vinton^{7}. He later managed The Marcels^{7}.

== 1960s ==
"If you expected to play Pittsburgh in the late '60s, pal, you either talked to Pat DiCesare or you stayed home." Ed Masley, Pittsburgh Post-Gazette

Tuesday, May 8, 1962, was the date of the first concert that DiCesare promoted himself. The show was the Four Freshmen at Stambaugh Auditorium in Youngstown, Ohio. At the time he worked as a record distributor for his mentor, Tim Tormey, who was a concert promoter and talent agent in the Pittsburgh area^{10}. DiCesare worked with him on his "Shower of Stars" concert series that featured several headline acts booked together to sell out large venues.

On September 14, 1964, Tormey and DiCesare brought the Beatles to the Pittsburgh Civic Arena^{11} during their first U.S. Tour. DiCesare put up the $5000 guarantee. He got the money from his father, who had to put a lien on his house to borrow money from the Westinghouse Electric Credit Union^{11}. The show sold out at a price of $5.90 per ticket. DiCesare had to miss the show because he had been drafted by the U.S. Army. Tormey worked the show while DiCesare was in Fort Sill, Oklahoma^{11}.

In 1965, DiCesare co-founded the Dapper Dan Roundball Classic with his friend Sonny Vaccaro. The inaugural game of its 43-year run was played on March 26, 1965, at the Pittsburgh Civic Arena. It was the first national high school All-Star game.

When Tormey left Pittsburgh for Hollywood to work with Dick Clark Productions^{1}, DiCesare continued to promote concerts on his own^{1} ^{11}. He called his company "University Attractions," and then finally "Pat DiCesare Productions^{1}." DiCesare had exclusive leases with the Civic Arena, Syria Mosque, and eventually Three Rivers Stadium^{1}, and therefore promoted almost all of the large rock concerts that played Pittsburgh in addition to promoting shows at many of the surrounding secondary markets such as Erie and Johnstown.

== 1970s ==
In the early 70s the Civic Arena continued to eclipse yearly attendance records due largely to the "new" phenomenon of the rock concert. Some Pat DiCesare Production sellouts at the Civic Arena in 1971 included 3 Chicago shows, Grand Funk Railroad, The Who, Black Sabbath, and Jesus Christ Superstar. In 1972, Pat DiCesare Productions also set and then reset the attendance record at that time for a rock concert in Pittsburgh with Three Dog Night and then Alice Cooper. Both played at the recently constructed Three Rivers Stadium.

In late 1973, DiCesare partnered with Rich Engler. Engler was a drummer in the band "Grains of Sand" and promoted shows in small towns in Western Pennsylvania. They called the new company "DiCesare-Engler Productions", and it became one of the top-grossing businesses amongst concert promoters in the nation. Engler focused on booking the acts. DiCesare focused on other entrepreneurial opportunities, most notably acquiring real estate.

In 1977, DiCesare-Engler took over operations at the Stanley Theatre in Downtown Pittsburgh. DiCesare soon put together a deal to purchase the theatre. The venue quickly became the number one grossing auditorium in the country.

== 1980s ==
In 1980 DiCesare-Engler expanded operations to Las Vegas for a brief period. Pat DiCesare promoted shows and operated the 7,500 seat Aladdin Theatre for the Performing Arts. He moved back to Pittsburgh in 1981 and partnered with Nick Censi and Rich Engler to make DECCO Records. They had signed a few local acts including Joe Gruscheky and Jimmy Barkan.

Despite the success of the Stanley Theatre, DiCesare-Engler sold the venue. In November 1983, the Pittsburgh Cultural Trust announced their $12 million purchase of the Stanley Theatre. It is now known as the Benedum Center. Earlier that same year, Pat DiCesare and Rich Engler received the Variety Club entertainment award for "Bringing Broadway back to Pittsburgh."^{11}.

In 1984, DiCesare-Engler signed a 10-year agreement with the Syria Mosque in Oakland (Pittsburgh), where they assumed management and continued promoting rock and Broadway shows as they did at the Stanley Theatre. Soon after the move, DiCesare began looking for a venue to do more shows in the summer since the Syria Mosque did not have air conditioning. They began booking the AJ Palumbo Center when it opened in 1988, and had built the Melody Amphitheatre (also known as IC Light Amphitheatre or Chevrolet Amphitheatre) at Station Square in 1989 where they booked shows for a seating capacity of 5000.

In 1986, DiCesare purchased almost 500 acres (2.0 km^{2}) of land near Cranberry Township just north of Pittsburgh with plans to build a major recreational center that would include an indoor mall, waterpark, children's theme park, and a $10 million outdoor amphitheatre with 7,500 covered seats and room for 12,500 lawn spectators. However, he lost $500,000 in a battle with the Adams Township zoning commission. He then purchased 250 acres (1.0 km^{2}) in Jackson Township, Pennsylvania. While trying to rezone his Jackson Township property, Pace Concerts of Houston, Texas broke ground in Burgettstown – located in Washington County, Pennsylvania about 45 minutes West of Pittsburgh.

== 1990s ==
In March 1990, the Pittsburgh Post-Gazette reported that DiCesare was abandoning plans to build an amphitheater and that "he (DiCesare-Engler) and PACE Entertainment Group of Houston would co-promote the Star Lake Amphitheater," which later opened in Burgettstown, Pennsylvania in June 1990. DiCesare was quoted as saying, "I'm convinced that the Pittsburgh area is not big enough to support two amphitheaters. . . We will be shifting our shows from the less desirable venues to the amphitheater." He had subsequently announced plans to build a $250 million, 2100 unit development on his Adams Township property, which some referred to as "DiCesare City." It is now known as "Adams Ridge."

DiCesare-Engler continued their strong performance in the concert industry. They remained in the top 20 in gross sales amongst US concert promoters thanks to the success of their smaller venues such as the AJ Palumbo Center, Syria Mosque, IC Light Amphitheatre, and their 1992 venture with Electric Factory Concerts to build the 4000 seat Bud Light Amphitheatre at Harveys Lake just 5 miles (8.0 km) outside of Wilkes-Barre, Pennsylvania. DiCesare-Engler also continued their usual volume of sales at the Civic Arena and Three Rivers Stadium in addition to their new association with Pace Concerts in booking shows at Starlake Amphitheatre. In 1997, when the Pittsburgh Post-Gazette first released their list of the "Top 50 Culture Brokers", Pat DiCesare and Rich Engler ranked 3rd.

In the 90s, DiCesare focused more on creating and booking festivals both locally and nationally, while Engler continued booking concerts. DiCesare created the "Fright Fest", the "Celebration of Lights, These festivals took place in Pittsburgh, Philadelphia, Baltimore, and Irvine, California. The Fright Fest was a Halloween event designed by Tom Savini that took place during the month of October. The Celebration of Lights is a drive through holiday light show that was designed as a charity event. It has become a yearly holiday tradition at Hartwood Acres in the Pittsburgh area and has attracted as many as 600,000 people in a season.

In March 1998, the Chief Executive of Allegheny County, Jim Roddey, announced that DiCesare-Engler would be taking over the Pittsburgh Three Rivers Regatta for the former Regatta Chairman, Eugene Connelly who was accused of misusing $227,000 in funds for personal use. At that time, the Regatta was $750,000 in debt. DiCesare was able to attract more sponsors and cut expenses by decreasing the event from six days to four days, and DiCesare-Engler was able to book bands at better prices.

Just days before the 1998 Regatta took place, it was announced that DiCesare-Engler Productions was sold to SFX Entertainment – a concert business trend that had preceded the DiCesare-Engler buyout in several other US markets. This announcement came only days after Pace Concerts had been sold to SFX. Engler would stay with the company and become the CEO of DiCesare-Engler/SFX. DiCesare, then 60 years old, elected to step away from the new business. This marked the end of an almost 25-year partnership between Pat DiCesare and Rich Engler.

Pat DiCesare did continue as the CEO of Regatta Management Group in 1998 and 1999.

== Later years ==
DiCesare was inactive in the music and entertainment business for many years after selling his share of the Regatta in 1999. In the fall of 2009 he began writing a series of articles for the Pittsburgh Post-Gazette and Pollstar about his experiences in the music industry. Topics so far have included The Beatles, The Del-Vikings, The Rolling Stones, Led Zeppelin, Bruce Springsteen, Janis Joplin, and the Pittsburgh Civic Arena.

In September 2014 his first book, entitled "Hard Days, Hard Nights" was released. In 2014, at a Beatles tribute concert at Heinz Hall, the City of Pittsburgh and the State of Pennsylvania declared the week of September 14 "Beatles Week" and September 14, 2014 "Pat DiCesare Day" in honor of the 50th Anniversary of the September 14, 1964 concert the Beatles played in Pittsburgh. The Beatles concert was promoted by Pat DiCesare and Tim Tormey. DiCesare planned events during the inaugural Beatles Week to commemorate the Beatles only visit to Pennsylvania that included a tribute "Relive The Beatles' '64" concert featuring the band Beatlemania Now amongst other tribute acts. The concert took place at the Benedum Center on September 13, 2014. It was the first concert that DiCesare had promoted in 15 years.
