= Made in U.S.A. (The Beach Boys album) =

Greatest hits album by the Beach Boys
- Released: July 7, 1986
- Recorded: April 1962 – 1969, 1975 – 1976, 1977 – 1978, 1984 – May 1986
- Genre: Rock
- Length: 64:15
- Label: Capitol/EMI
- Producers: Nick Venet; Brian Wilson; Carl Wilson; Al Jardine; Steve Levine; Terry Melcher

The Beach Boys chronology
The Beach Boys (1985)	Made in U.S.A. (1986)	Still Cruisin' (1989)

Professional ratings
Review scores
Source	Rating
AllMusic	3/5 stars
Encyclopedia of Popular Music	4/5 stars

Made in U.S.A. is a 1986 double vinyl album (or one-CD) compilation, containing some of the Beach Boys' biggest hits. Released by the group’s original record label, Capitol Records, it marked a brief return to the label, with which the Beach Boys released one further album, 1989's Still Cruisin'.

Featuring a number of their 1960s classics, in addition to a sampling of its later hits, Made in U.S.A. also contains two new recordings, both produced by Terry Melcher. "Rock 'n' Roll to the Rescue" is a Mike Love/Melcher collaboration, and "California Dreamin'" is a cover of the Mamas & the Papas' late 1965 debut single. Both were released as singles and made the U.S. pop singles chart.

A slow seller, Made in U.S.A. reached No. 96 in the U.S. and ultimately went double platinum there.

== Promotional videos ==
The first video released for Made in U.S.A. was for the single "Rock 'n' Roll to the Rescue". The video features a common Beach Boys theme of the beach, surfboards, and cars. The video features all (then-surviving) members of the Beach Boys (Brian Wilson, Carl Wilson, Mike Love, Al Jardine, and Bruce Johnston) with the exception of David Marks, Blondie Chaplin, and Ricky Fataar, who at the time were not active members.

The second music video produced for the album is a black and white video of the song "California Dreamin'". The video is predominantly filmed at a church and features all (then-surviving) members of the Beach Boys (Brian Wilson, Carl Wilson, Mike Love, Al Jardine, and Bruce Johnston). The Mamas & the Papas member and "California Dreamin'" songwriter John Phillips appears in the video as a preacher within the church; also featured in the video are his ex-wife Michelle Phillips and Roger McGuinn of the Byrds.

== Track listing ==
All songs by Brian Wilson and Mike Love, except where noted.

Side A

1. "Surfin' Safari" – 2:05
2. "409" (Brian Wilson, Mike Love, Gary Usher) – 1:58
3. "Surfin' U.S.A." (Brian Wilson, Chuck Berry) – 2:27
4. "Be True to Your School" – 2:07
  Single version with cheerleader chant (Provided by The Honeys)
5. "Surfer Girl" (Brian Wilson) – 2:23
6. "Dance, Dance, Dance" (Brian Wilson, Carl Wilson, Mike Love) – 1:59

Side B

1. "Fun, Fun, Fun" – 2:16
2. "I Get Around" – 2:11
3. "Help Me, Rhonda" – 2:45
4. "Don't Worry Baby" (Brian Wilson, Roger Christian) – 2:42
5. "California Girls" – 2:37
6. "When I Grow Up (To Be a Man)" – 2:00
7. "Barbara Ann" (Fred Fassert) – 2:05

Side C

1. "Good Vibrations" – 3:36
2. "Heroes and Villains" (Brian Wilson, Van Dyke Parks) – 3:37
3. "Wouldn't It Be Nice" (Brian Wilson, Tony Asher, Mike Love) – 2:23
  Alternative mono mix with a different, more prominent lead vocal, due to the original mix being temporarily lost
4. "Sloop John B." (Traditional, arranged by Brian Wilson) – 2:56
5. "God Only Knows" (Brian Wilson, Tony Asher) – 2:48
6. "Caroline, No" (Brian Wilson, Tony Asher) – 2:17
  Single version without passing train/barking dogs coda

Side D

1. "Do It Again" – 2:18
  Single version without workshop effects coda
2. "Rock and Roll Music" (Chuck Berry) – 2:28
3. "Come Go with Me" (C.E. Quick) – 2:06
4. "Getcha Back" (Mike Love, Terry Melcher) – 3:01
5. "Rock 'n' Roll to the Rescue" (Mike Love, Terry Melcher) – 3:44
6. "California Dreamin'" (John Phillips, Michelle Phillips) – 3:10
  Roger McGuinn on electric guitar

== Singles ==
- "Rock 'n' Roll to the Rescue" b/w "Good Vibrations (Live in London)" (Capitol), June 9, 1986 U.S. No. 68
- "California Dreamin'" b/w "Lady Liberty" (Capitol), September 1, 1986 U.S. No. 57
