= The Beach Boys (album) =

Studio album by the Beach Boys
- Released: June 10, 1985
- Recorded: June 1984–March 23, 1985
- Studios: Red Bus Recording Studios; CBS Studios (London); Westlake Audio (Los Angeles)
- Length: 37:52 (LP); 40:31 (CD)
- Label: Brother/Caribou/CBS
- Producer: Steve Levine

The Beach Boys chronology
Rarities (1983)	The Beach Boys (1985)	Made in U.S.A. (1986)

Singles from The Beach Boys
- 1. "Getcha Back" b/w "Male Ego" Released: May 8, 1985; 2. "It's Gettin' Late" Released: July 17, 1985; 3. "She Believes in Love Again" b/w "It's Just a Matter of Time" Released: October 1985

The Beach Boys is the 25th studio album by American rock band the Beach Boys, released on June 10, 1985. Produced by Steve Levine, the album is the band's first after the death of founding member Dennis Wilson. The album saw the band incorporate 1980's contemporary musical styles into their own sound and was intended to be a "comeback" for the band. It was also the band's first album to be recorded digitally and the last released by James William Guercio's Caribou Records.

Supported by the release of its lead single "Getcha Back", The Beach Boys charted at number fifty-two in the United States and number sixty in the United Kingdom. A further two singles – "It's Gettin' Late" and "She Believes in Love Again" were released in July and October 1985 respectively.

Among the guest musicians, Ringo Starr played drums on "California Calling", while Stevie Wonder played most of the instruments on "I Do Love You".

== Release and promotion ==
To promote the release of the album, "Getcha Back" was released as the lead single on 8 May 1985 to moderate commercial success, reaching number twenty-six on the US Billboard Hot 100 singles charts, and narrowly charting within the top one hundred of the singles charts in the United Kingdom, peaking at number ninety-seven. Cash Box wrote that the song "so wonderously recalls [the Beach Boys'] earlier times and earlier sounds." A second single, "It's Gettin' Late", was released on 17 July 1985, achieving moderate commercial success in the United States where it reached number eighty-two on the Billboard Hot 100, twenty on the Billboard Adult Contemporary Charts and twelve on the Gavin Report Adult Contemporary charts. A third and final single, "She Believes in Love Again", was released in October 1985.

The album was released on 10 June 1985 and proved a modest success, becoming their highest-charting album in the US since 15 Big Ones. The Beach Boys was the group's final album for CBS. The following year they returned to Capitol with a 25th anniversary greatest hits album Made in U.S.A, which featured two new tracks, "Rock 'n' Roll to the Rescue" and a cover of the Mamas and the Papas' "California Dreamin'", with the latter featuring Roger McGuinn of the Byrds on lead guitar. Made in U.S.A eventually went double platinum.

On July 4, 1985, the group played to an afternoon crowd of over one million in Philadelphia, and the same evening they performed for over 750,000 people on the Mall in Washington. They also appeared nine days later at the Live Aid concert and performed at the "opening campfire" of the 1985 National Scout Jamboree for a crowd of over 32,000 members and guests of the Boy Scouts of America. The band's performances on July 4, 1985, marked the first time that actor John Stamos would sit in with The Beach Boys. Stamos would also collaborate with the band on You Again? and Full House and promote the band's later releases on the show. Stamos' occasional guest appearances have continued since 1985. Jardine's son Matt joined the touring band in 1988 as a percussionist, with Figueroa leaving by that summer.

The Beach Boys spent the next several years touring, often playing in front of large audiences, and recording songs for film soundtracks and various artists compilations. Brian Wilson's psychologist Eugene Landy, who was originally awarded co-writing credits on Wilson's songs, stated in a contemporary interview, "I'm practically a member of the band [...] Brian's got the talent to make the music. [...] He's the creator. The other band members are just performers. So I'm the one who's making the album." Commenting on his relationship to the band in 1988, Brian said that he avoided his family at Landy's suggestion, adding that "Although we stay together as a group, as people we're a far cry from friends." Love denied the accusation that he and the band were keeping Brian from participating with the group.

== Reception ==
Professional ratings
Review scores
Source	Rating
AllMusic	2/5 stars
Blender	1/5 stars
Christgau's Record Guide	C
Encyclopedia of Popular Music	3/5 stars
The Rolling Stone Album Guide	1/5 stars

Critical reaction was mixed. Writing in Rolling Stone, Parke Puterbaugh called the album 'pretty entertaining', adding 'though not a world-beating act of artistic reassertion, the LP does serve to showcase those amazing voices, and to remind the world that nobody does it better—still.'

Commercially, The Beach Boys marked a moderate return for the band, with the album debuting at number sixty on the albums charts in the United Kingdom, spending two weeks in total within the top one hundred. In the United States, it debuted at number fifty-two on the Billboard 200 albums charts, and spent a combined total of fourteen weeks on the charts. Similarly, it achieved moderate success in the national albums charts in territories including Australia, Canada and Germany.

The album was ranked as the 26th best Beach Boys album of all time by Classic Rock magazine, saying that despite the single "Getcha Back" reaching the top thirty of the Billboard Hot 100, "there's little else here to care about".

Levine reflected that he had remained "immensely proud" of the album and lamented its poor sales.

== Track listing ==
Eugene Landy originally received co-writer's credit for all Brian Wilson compositions. This credit was omitted starting with the album's 2000 CD reissue.

No.	Title	Writer(s)	Lead vocals	Length
1.	"Getcha Back"	Mike Love; Terry Melcher	Mike Love and Brian Wilson	3:02
2.	"It's Gettin' Late"	Carl Wilson; Myrna Smith-Schilling; Robert White Johnson	Carl Wilson	3:27
3.	"Crack at Your Love"	Brian Wilson; Al Jardine	Al Jardine and B. Wilson	3:40
4.	"Maybe I Don't Know"	C. Wilson; Smith-Schilling; Steve Levine; Julian Stewart Lindsay	C. Wilson	3:54
5.	"She Believes in Love Again"	Bruce Johnston	Bruce Johnston and C. Wilson	3:29
6.	"California Calling"	Jardine; B. Wilson	Love and Jardine	2:50
7.	"Passing Friend"	George O'Dowd; Roy Hay	C. Wilson	5:00
8.	"I'm So Lonely"	B. Wilson	B. Wilson and C. Wilson	2:52
9.	"Where I Belong"	C. Wilson; Johnson	C. Wilson and Jardine	2:58
10.	"I Do Love You"	Stevie Wonder	C. Wilson with Jardine	4:20
11.	"It's Just a Matter of Time"	B. Wilson	B. Wilson and Love	2:23

CD bonus track
No.	Title	Writer(s)	Lead vocals	Length
12.	"Male Ego"	B. Wilson, Love	B. Wilson and Love	2:32

== Personnel ==
Credits sourced from Craig Slowinski, John Brode, Will Crerar and Joshilyn Hoisington. Track numbers refer to the CD release.

The Beach Boys

- Al Jardine – lead (3, 6, 9, 10) and backing vocals (all but 4 and 5), electric guitars (6)
- Bruce Johnston – lead (5) and backing vocals (all tracks), Kurzweil K250 (5)
- Mike Love – lead (1, 6, 11, 12) and backing vocals (all but 4)
- Brian Wilson – lead (1, 3, 8, 11, 12) and backing vocals (all but 5), Yamaha DX1 (3, 6, 8, 11, 12), Roland Jupiter-8 (3), Oberheim OB-8 (3), Oberheim Xpander (12), piano (6)
- Carl Wilson – lead (2, 4, 5, 7–10) and backing vocals (all tracks), Yamaha DX1 (2, 4, 9), electric guitar (2)

Additional players

- John Alder – electric (1, 6, 8) and acoustic guitars (1), guitar synthesizer (4), dobros (11)
- Graham Broad – drums (4), drums with brushes (11), jingle stick (1), castanets (1), maracas (1), bongos (1), hi-hat (2, 5), cowbell (4), congas (5), shaker (5), tom-tom (11), tambourine (1, 11)
- Jeffrey Foskett – backing vocals (5)
- Stuart Gordon – violins (5), violas (5), cellos (5)
- Steve Grainger – baritone saxophone (1, 2), tenor saxophone (7)
- Roy Hay – electric guitars (7), Yamaha DX1 (7), PPG Wave 2.3 (7), Oberheim OB-8 (7), Oberheim Xpander (7), Prophet-5 (7)
- Simon Humphrey – bass guitar (6)
- Judd Lander – harmonica (11)
- Steve Levine – Fairlight CMI programming (all tracks), LinnDrum programming (1–4, 7, 8, 12), Simmons hi-hat (3)
- Julian Lindsay – Kurzweil K250 (1, 9, 11), PPG Wave 2.3 (1–3, 6, 8, 9, 11, 12), Oberheim OB-8 (2, 4, 6, 9, 11), Yamaha DX1 (1, 2, 4, 5, 9), Oberheim Xpander (5), Prophet-5 (2), Roland Jupiter-8 (4), E-mu Emulator (9), bass guitar (1, 2, 4), organ (6, 11), acoustic piano (10)
- Marcus Miller – bass guitar (3)
- Kenneth McGregor – trombone (2, 5)
- Terry Melcher – backing vocals and Kurzweil K250 (1)
- Gary Moore – electric guitars (4, 5), Synthaxe (5)
- Ian Ritchie – tenor saxophone (2, 8), Lyricon (3), baritone saxophone (12)
- Dave Spence – trumpet (2)
- Ringo Starr – drums and timpani (6)
- Stevie Wonder – Fender Rhodes electric piano (10), harmonica (10), bass synthesizer (10), Linn 9000 drum machine (10), tambourine (10)

== Charts ==
Chart (1985)	Peak position
U.S. Billboard 200 (Billboard)	52
UK Albums (OCC)	60
Australia (ARIA)	67
Canada (RPM)	74
Germany (GfK)	60

== Bibliography ==
- Dillon, Mark (2012). Fifty Sides of the Beach Boys: The Songs That Tell Their Story. ECW Press. ISBN 978-1-77090-198-8.
- Doe, Andrew; Tobler, John (2004). Brian Wilson and the Beach Boys: The Complete Guide to Their Music. ISBN 9781844494262.
- Love, Mike; Hirsch, James S. (2016). Good Vibrations: My Life as a Beach Boy. Penguin. pp. 333–334.
- White, Timothy (1996). The Nearest Faraway Place: Brian Wilson, the Beach Boys, and the Southern Californian Experience. Macmillan. ISBN 0333649370.
