= She Believes in Love Again =

"She Believes In Love Again"

Single by the Beach Boys

from the album The Beach Boys
- B-side: "It's Just a Matter of Time"
- Released: October 1985
- Recorded: December 1984
- Length: 3:29
- Label: Caribou
- Songwriter(s): Bruce Johnston
- Producer(s): Steve Levine

The Beach Boys singles chronology
"It's Gettin' Late" (1985)	"She Believes In Love Again" (1985)	"Rock 'n' Roll to the Rescue" / "Good Vibrations (live)" (1986)

"She Believes in Love Again" is a song written by Bruce Johnston for the American rock band the Beach Boys. It was released on their 1985 album The Beach Boys, and it first appeared on the Billboard Adult Contemporary chart in late October 1985. It peaked at number 26 on that chart in early November, staying on the chart for six weeks.

The song was re-recorded during the That's Why God Made the Radio sessions but was not included on the final track list.

== Personnel ==
Credits sourced from Craig Slowinski, John Brode, Will Crerar and Joshilyn Hoisington.

The Beach Boys

- Bruce Johnston – lead (verses) and backing vocals, Kurzweil K250
- Mike Love – backing vocals
- Carl Wilson – lead (chorus) and backing vocals

Session musicians

- Graham Broad – hi-hat, congas, shaker
- Jeffrey Foskett – backing vocals
- Stuart Gordon – violins, violas, cellos
- Steve Levine – Fairlight CMI programming, producer
- Julian Lindsay – Yamaha DX1, Oberheim Xpander
- Kenneth McGregor – trombone
- Gary Moore – electric guitars, Synthaxe

== Chart positions ==
Chart (1985)	Peak position
US Billboard Adult Contemporary	26
