= Capital Classic (all-star game) =

American high school all-star basketball game

The Capital Classic is an annual American all-star game featuring high school basketball players. It is the country's longest-running high school all-star basketball game. The game pits a team of all-stars from the Washington, D.C., area against stars from around the United States. In its prime in the late 1970s and 1980s, the game drew star players such as Patrick Ewing, Grant Hill, Magic Johnson, Michael Jordan, Ralph Sampson, and Dominique Wilkins.

== History ==
The Capital Classic was started in 1974 by Bob Geoghan, and was originally sponsored by local McDonald's franchises. The inaugural game was held at the new Capital Centre in Landover, Maryland, and drew over 11,000 fans. Moses Malone was the big draw. Officials expected a smaller crowd. They had only planned for one ticket window to be open. However, around 7,000 walk-up tickets were sold, and three more windows were opened. Cars were backed up, reportedly for five miles (8.0 km), and the game was delayed by a half hour.

In 1977, Geoghan wanted to create a national game with the East versus the West, but McDonald's rejected the idea. Instead, their national office asked him to select their first All-American team. Fifteen players—including future NBA players Gene Banks, Magic Johnson, and Albert King—were named to the inaugural McDonald's All-American Team to play in the Capital Classic; twelve were placed on the U.S. team, while three local players were added to the team of Washington, Maryland, and Virginia players. With McDonald's backing in 1978, Geoghan started the national all-star game, the McDonald's All-American Game. Sonny Vaccaro, founder of the rival Dapper Dan Roundball Classic, accused the Capital Classic of telling some players that they needed to compete in their game if they wanted to be selected to the McDonald's All-American Team, which Geoghan denied.

McDonald's stopped sponsoring the Capital Classic after the 1991 contest. The game's appeal fell in the late 1990s, losing players to the McDonald's All-American Game and the Roundball Classic. Since 1982, the NCAA limited high school seniors to playing in only two all-star games. The Capital Classic regained its stature after partnering with Nike in 2002. The event was renamed to the Jordan Brand Capital Classic, after Nike's separate label endorsed by Michael Jordan, who was playing with the Washington Wizards at the time. With Jordan Brand, practically all of the top players in the Classic were from Nike programs or teams they sponsored. In 2003, LeBron James committed to play in the game, citing his relationship with Michael Jordan as a motivation. After Jordan was fired from his executive position with the Wizards, he attempted to move the event from the D.C. area to New York. However, Geoghan refused, and Nike's sponsorship of the Classic ended as Jordan started the Jordan Brand Classic in New York's Madison Square Garden in 2005. The Capital Classic competed with the new Jordan game for players. Since the 2003 game featuring James drew a crowd of 18,424, the attendance fell to an average of about 3,000.
