= It's Gettin' Late =

Single by the Beach Boys

from the album The Beach Boys
- B-side: "It's O.K."
- Released: July 17, 1985
- Recorded: June 21 to November 14 1984
- Genre: Rock
- Length: 3:27
- Label: Caribou Records
- Songwriters: Carl Wilson; Myrna Smith Schilling; Robert White Johnson
- Producer: Steve Levine

The Beach Boys singles chronology
"Getcha Back" (1985)	"It's Gettin' Late" (1985)	"She Believes in Love Again" (1985)

"It's Gettin' Late" is a song written by Carl Wilson, Myrna Smith Schilling and Robert White Johnson for the American rock band the Beach Boys. It was released on their 1985 album The Beach Boys and as a single with "It's O.K."

Billboard compared it to the Beach Boys' previous single "Getcha Back" which was about "teen reminiscence" saying that "It's Getting Late" brings the group's "harmonica tapestry hauntingly into the adult world."

The music video directed by Dominic Orlando, was filmed on location in Malibu, California, two months after Getcha Back. The video features an appearance of future The Bold and the Beautiful cast member Katherine Kelly Lang.

== Personnel ==
Credits sourced from Craig Slowinski, John Brode, Will Crerar and Joshilyn Hoisington.

The Beach Boys

- Al Jardine – backing vocals
- Bruce Johnston – backing vocals
- Mike Love – backing vocals
- Brian Wilson – backing vocals
- Carl Wilson – lead and backing vocals, Yamaha DX1, electric guitar

Session musicians

- Graham Broad – hi-hat
- Steve Grainger – baritone saxophone
- Steve Levine – Fairlight CMI and LinnDrum programming
- Julian Lindsay – Yamaha DX1, PPG Wave 2.3, Oberheim OB-8, Prophet-5, bass guitar
- Kenneth McGregor – trombone
- Ian Ritchie – tenor saxophone
- Dave Spence – trumpet

== Chart positions ==
Chart	Peak position
US Billboard Hot 100	82
US Billboard Adult Contemporary	20
US Cash Box 100	78
US Gavin Report Adult Contemporary	12
US Radio & Records Adult Contemporary	18
