= I'm Spinning =

Single by The Del-Vikings
- B-side: "You Say You Love Me(FeeBee) When I Come Home (Dot)"
- Released: August 1957
- Genre: Doo-wop
- Length: 2:05
- Label: Fee Bee, Dot Records
- Songwriter: Pat DiCesare

The Del-Vikings singles chronology
"Whispering Bells" (1957)	"I'm Spinning" (1957)	"Watching the Moon" (1973)

I'm Spinning is a doo-wop song recorded by the Del-Vikings on the Fee Bee Records label in 1957 in Pittsburgh, Pennsylvania as an A-side for the single "I'm Spinning"/"You Say You Love Me," written by Pat DiCesare. It was soon released on Dot Records for national distribution, and later released by Mercury Records when Kripp Johnson rejoined the Del-Vikings in 1958. Over the years the song has been included on many Del Vikings greatest hits albums and doo-wop compilation albums on various labels. The most recent release was in 2009.

== Controversy ==
The single was involved in a legal battle between the label and management of the Del-Vikings and the Dell-Vikings, both claiming to be the rightful owners of the song. In 1957, with most of his bandmates in military service, Kripp Johnson signed with Dot Records calling his group the Dell-Vikings (with an extra 'L'). The Johnson lead group released the single at the same time as the original group did on Mercury Records. The Mercury Del-Vikings won the legal case and the Dell-Vikings changed their name to the Versatiles.
