= Getcha Back =

Single by the Beach Boys

from the album The Beach Boys
- B-side: "Male Ego"
- Released: May 8, 1985
- Length: 2:59
- Label: Brother
- Songwriters: Mike Love; Terry Melcher
- Producer: Steve Levine

The Beach Boys singles chronology
"Come Go with Me" (1981)	"Getcha Back" (1985)	"It's Gettin' Late" (1985)

"Getcha Back" is a song written by Mike Love and Terry Melcher for the American rock band the Beach Boys, on their 1985 album The Beach Boys. It was the band's first release since the drowning death of Dennis Wilson in 1983. The song peaked at No. 26 on the Billboard Hot 100 and No. 2 on the Adult Contemporary chart.

Musically, the backing vocals resemble those from the 1959 hit "Hushabye" by the Mystics, which the Beach Boys had covered in 1964 for their All Summer Long album. Comparisons could also be made to Bruce Springsteen's 1980 hit "Hungry Heart", which Love later recorded a cover of for a tribute album.

== Reception ==
Cash Box said the song "so wonderously recalls [the Beach Boys'] earlier times and earlier sounds."

Allmusic's William Ruhlmann stated that "despite the production sheen provided by Steve Levine (of Culture Club fame), this is another competent but uninspired effort."

== Music video ==
The music video, directed by Dominic Orlando, was filmed on location in Malibu and Venice, California. It featured a then-unknown Katherine Kelly Lang, who went on to play Brooke Logan on the soap opera The Bold and the Beautiful.

== Personnel ==
Credits sourced from Craig Slowinski, John Brode, Will Crerar and Joshilyn Hoisington.

The Beach Boys

- Al Jardine - backing vocals
- Bruce Johnston - backing vocals
- Mike Love - lead and backing vocals
- Brian Wilson - co-lead and backing vocals
- Carl Wilson - backing vocals

Session musicians

- John Alder - electric and acoustic guitars
- Graham Broad - jingle stick, tambourine, castanets, maracas, bongos
- Steve Grainger - baritone saxophone
- Steve Levine - Fairlight CMI and LinnDrum programming, producer
- Julian Lindsay - Kurzweil K250, PPG Wave 2.3, Yamaha DX1, bass guitar
- Terry Melcher - backing vocals, Kurzweil K250

== Chart positions ==
Chart (1985)	Peak position
Australian Singles Chart	81
Austria Media Control	8
Canada Top Singles	26
Canada RPM Adult Contemporary	4
European Airplay Top 50	22
Germany Media Control	12
UK Singles	97
US Billboard Hot 100	26
US Billboard Adult Contemporary	2
US Cash Box Top 100	25
US Cash Box Jukebox Programmer	20
US Gavin Report Top 40	17
US Gavin Report Adult Contemporary	1
US Radio & Records Contemporary Hit Radio	23
US Radio & Records Adult Contemporary	2

== Cover versions ==
Mark McGrath, lead singer of the California rock band Sugar Ray, performed a cover of this song for the soundtrack of Herbie: Fully Loaded (2005). The Beach Boys version appears at the beginning, during the flashback of Herbie's racing career and adventures during the opening credits.

Mike Love re-recorded the song for his 2017 solo album Unleash the Love. This version features altered lyrics and a new third verse, and features John Stamos on percussion.
