= Daytona Lights =

English indie pop band

- Daytona Lights Logo

Background information
- Origin: London, England
- Genres: Groove pop, Indie rock, indie pop,
- Years active: 2006–2013
- Label: Summer Omelette
- Members: Dan Lawrence; Matt Gill; Laurence Saywood; Sam Fordham; Louis Souyave
- Website: daytonalights.com

Daytona Lights were an English indie pop band from London, England.

== History ==
The band formed in 2006 at East 15 Acting School where they first performed with an alternative line-up. In 2010 Louis Souyave joined the band and went on to begin touring the London live music circuit.

The band were signed in 2010 by Hubris Records Ltd, the record label of producer Steve Levine. In 2012 the band parted ways with Hubris and founded their own label Summer Omelette. Summer Omelette's first release was the single "Midnight Beach" which was followed up by the "Old Fashioned Love" EP, produced by the band's guitarist Louis Souyave.

Daytona Lights split in late 2013.

== Music ==
The band has received air time on BBC Radio 1, XFM, BBC Radio 1Xtra, BBC Radio 6, BalconyTV, and a remix of their 2012 single "My Place" by Boy George. XFM's John Kennedy has championed the band on his show through various live sessions and airplay.

Their debut studio album This Modern Landscape was released 29 December 2011. They are credited with coining the genre description "Groove-Pop".

== Television ==
In 2009, the band appeared in BlackBerry's 'Love What You Do' commercial and in 2010 the band's single 'Lillian' was used for an Olympus commercial.

In September 2011, it was announced Daytona Lights would be joining the regular cast of UK soap Hollyoaks, where they would play "partially fictional versions of themselves". who would go on form the band within the show and play their own music which would then become available on iTunes. The band's last appearance on the show came in May 2012 as story arcs concluded.

== Members ==
- Dan Lawrence - Lead Vocals/Acoustic Guitar
- Matt Gill - Guitar/Trombone/Vocals
- Laurence Saywood - Bass/Vocals
- Sam Fordham - Drums/Vocals
- Louis Souyave - Lead Guitar/Vocals

== Discography ==
=== Albums and EPs ===
- Air.and.Balloon EP (Self Released - 2010)
- This Modern Landscape LP (Hubris Records - 2011)
- Old Fashioned Love EP (Summer Omelette Records - May 2013)

=== Singles ===
- "White Horses" (Hubris Records - 2011)
- "Lillian" (Hubris Records - 2011)
- "My Place" (Hubris Records - 2012)
- "Midnight Beach" (Summer Omelette - 2013)
