= Roundball Classic =

National high school basketball all-star game

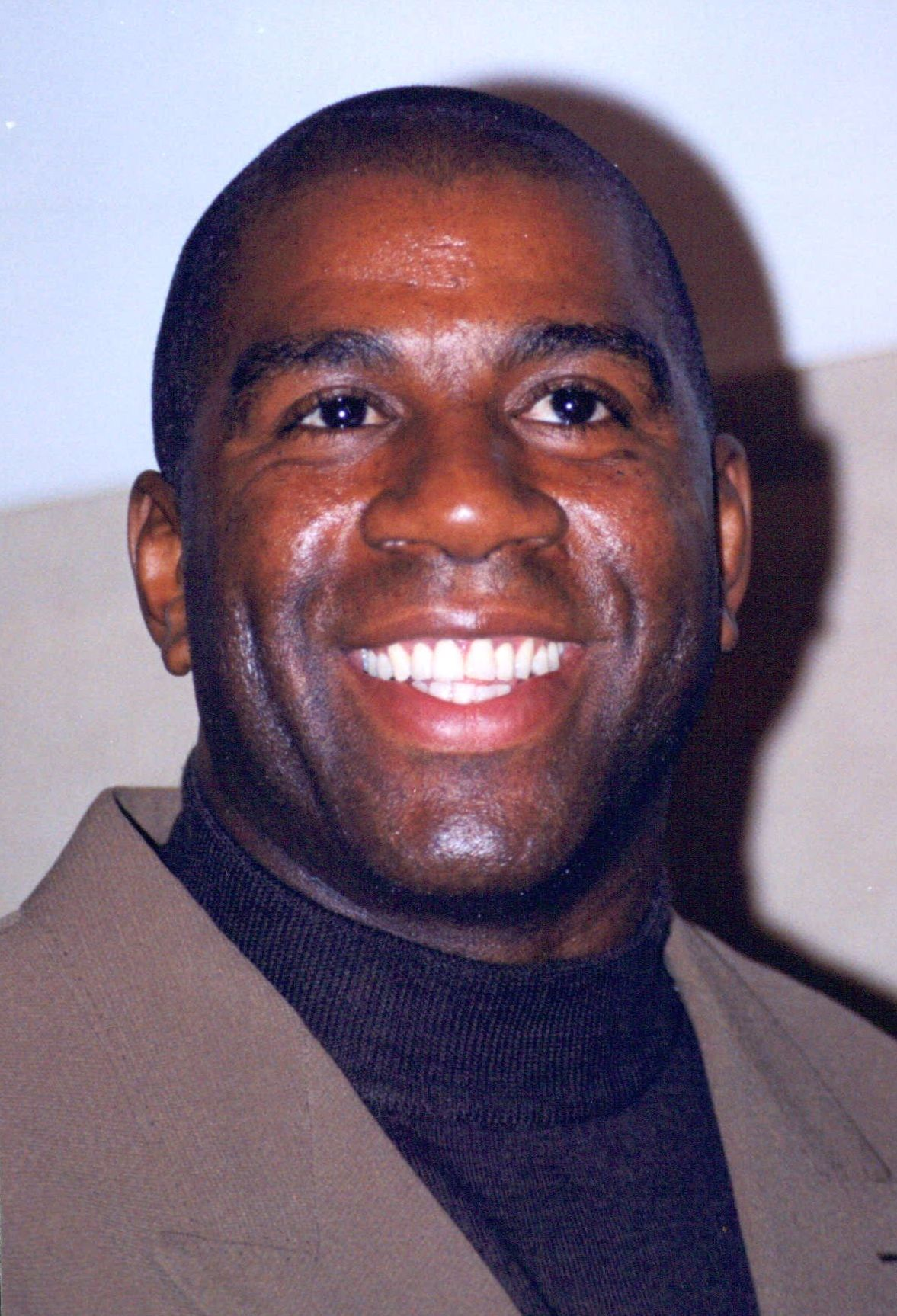
Magic Johnson (pictured here in 1999) sponsored the event in the 1990s.

The Roundball Classic, originally known as The Dapper Dan Roundball Classic (also known as Magic Johnson's Roundball, Sonny Vaccaro's Roundball Classic, EA Sports Roundball Classic, Asics Roundball Classic) is well known in the sports world as the first national high school All Star basketball game. It was sponsored by and used as a fundraising event for the Dapper Dan Charities in Pittsburgh. The inaugural game was played at the Civic Arena in Pittsburgh, Pennsylvania on March 26, 1965.

== History ==
=== Founding ===
The cofounders of the game, Sonny Vaccaro and Pat DiCesare, were two boyhood friends from the small Western Pennsylvania town of Trafford. Vaccaro was a young school teacher and sports enthusiast who in the early 1960s had organized local high school basketball tournaments throughout Pennsylvania. His friend and college roommate Pat DiCesare (future president of DiCesare Engler Productions) had made a name for himself by promoting major concert events in Western Pennsylvania. Vaccaro wanted to do a basketball tournament in the Pittsburgh area, and asked DiCesare if he had interest in promoting the event. DiCesare, who had just brought the Beatles to the Pittsburgh Civic Arena, wanted the event to have national appeal and take place in a large venue. So, he encouraged his friend to recruit the best players in the country. The two friends decided that the game would feature high school All-Star players recruited from Pennsylvania against those recruited from the rest of the United States, and it would be played at the Pittsburgh Civic Arena.

Tim Tormey, a friend and business mentor to Pat DiCesare, initiated a meeting between DiCesare and Al Abrams. Abrams was the senior sports editor for the Pittsburgh Post-Gazette and the president of the Dapper Dan Club, a charitable organization associated with the Post-Gazette. Having Abrams involved meant sponsorship for the game as well as months of sports coverage in the Post-Gazette leading up to the game. Abrams agreed to have the Dapper Dan Club sponsor the game, but DiCesare had to guarantee Abrams that he would cover any monetary losses and that a portion of the proceeds would go the Dapper Dan Club charities. DiCesare booked a date for the first game to be played on March 26, 1965, at the Civic Arena.

The first game suffered a major recruiting loss when the premier recruit in the nation, Lew Alcindor (later known as Kareem Abdul-Jabbar) declined their offer to play in the game. His coach would not allow him to play. Otherwise, Vaccaro had succeeded in getting big time high school talent from Pennsylvania and the rest of the United States. The format for the first game featured the National All-Stars vs. the Pennsylvania All-Stars at 9pm with a preliminary game that featured the Western Pennsylvania All Stars vs. City Catholic All-Stars game at 7pm. More than 10,000 fans attended the first game.

=== Growth ===
In the early years, the game quickly gained greater media coverage and a bigger fan following. The game was important for recruiting purposes as hundreds of colleges coaches and even pro scouts attended the game. It was known to be the "premier high school basketball attraction in the entire nation".

The most popular years were in the 1970s and early 1980s with a record crowd of almost 17,000 fans in 1977. In 1985 the matchup was slated as the East US All-Stars vs. the West US All-Stars. Some believed that changing the format and eliminating the Pennsylvania All-Stars compromised the attendance of the game. The attendance declined slightly in the mid to late 1980s, but the game still received national attention. It was well represented by all of the major recruiting figures in college basketball, and well respected in the sport of basketball. ESPN continued to broadcast the game yearly. Ultimately, the game was hurt by the emergence of other high school All Star games that followed – most notably the McDonald's High School All-American Game that began in 1977. Also, the NCAA enacted a rule that restricted athletes to play in only two All-Star games.

=== Decline and end ===
The game suffered two major losses in the early 1990s when both Nike and the Dapper Dan Club pulled their sponsorship. With DiCesare's blessing, Sonny Vaccaro moved the game to Detroit in 1993. The 28th Annual Roundball Classic was the last to be played in Pittsburgh on April 11, 1992.

The demand for the game in Pittsburgh was great enough that the Civic Arena in cooperation with Pat DiCesare continued doing a high school All-Star basketball game with Asics as a sponsor and utilizing player recruiters from local colleges. As expected, the Pittsburgh game could not get the talent that Vaccaro was able to get in Detroit. The last game in Pittsburgh was played in April 1994.

Vaccaro took the game to Detroit in 1993 where it became known as Magic Johnson's Roundball Classic. The game was played there for 7 years. It was moved to Raleigh, North Carolina in 2000 until it finally was moved to Chicago in 2002 (the 2001 edition was held at the Welsh–Ryan Arena in Evanston, Illinois) where it was simply named "The Roundball Classic". The game continued to have successful years after Pittsburgh. Most notably, it sold out the United Center in Chicago in 2003 when the game featured LeBron James, gathering an attendance of 19,678, the highest in Roundball Classic history, beating the previous record of 16,649 established in 1977. The last game was The 43rd Roundball Classic played in Chicago in 2007.

== Game results ==
Year	Result	Attendance
1965	Pennsylvania 89, U.S. 76	10,334
1966	U.S. 114, Pennsylvania 106	9,587
1967	U.S. 97, Pennsylvania 88	10,700
1968	U.S. 103, Pennsylvania 90	13,266
1969	Pennsylvania 74, U.S. 67	13,380
1970	U.S. 87, Pennsylvania 81	13,402
1971	Pennsylvania 110, U.S. 98	13,592
1972	U.S. 97, Pennsylvania 88	13,207
1973	U.S. 87, Pennsylvania 74	13,600
1974	U.S. 77, Pennsylvania 76	13,092
1975	U.S. 107, Pennsylvania 96	13,333
1976	U.S. 105, Pennsylvania 93	16,166
1977	Pennsylvania 98, U.S. 92	16,649
1978	U.S. 105, Pennsylvania 100	16,355
1979	April 5 (Semifinals): U.S. Southwest 97, Pennsylvania 92; U.S. East 111, U.S. Midwest 105	8,081
1979	April 6 (Finals): U.S. East 109, U.S. Southwest 95; U.S. Midwest 109, Pennsylvania 91	14,539
1980	U.S. 89, Pennsylvania 87	16,361
1981	U.S. 108, Pennsylvania 73	15,512
1982	Pennsylvania 91, U.S. 85	14,326
1983	U.S. 123, Pennsylvania 121	12,770
1984	U.S. 105, Pennsylvania 98	13,283
1985	U.S. 114, Pennsylvania 97	11,621
1986	U.S. North 96, U.S. South 94; U.S. East 98, Pennsylvania 96	8,309
1987	West 110, East 99	12,325
1988	East 121, West 100	14,042
1989	East 96, West 84	12,378
1990	East 111, West 97	11,655
1991	West 104, East 103	10,101
1992	East 105, West 102	10,909
1993	West 131, East 95	14,257
1994	East 141, West 135	10,121
1995	West 114, East 99	12,183
1996	West 127, East 117	13,412
1997	West 124, East 106	14,163
1998	West 135, East 116	13,758
1999	West 146, East 137	10,327
2000	East 146, West 131	N/A
2001	East 151, West 148	5,712
2002	East 115, West 103	7,359
2003	West 120, East 119	19,678
2004	East 124, West 110	15,421
2005	West 136, East 119	14,598
2006	West 118, East 102	10,384
2007	West 144, East 123	9,865

=== Wins by team ===
==== Pennsylvania vs. United States format ====
Team	Wins
United States	15
Pennsylvania	5

==== East vs West format ====
Team	Wins
West	12
East	9

== MVPs ==
=== Pennsylvania vs. United States format ===
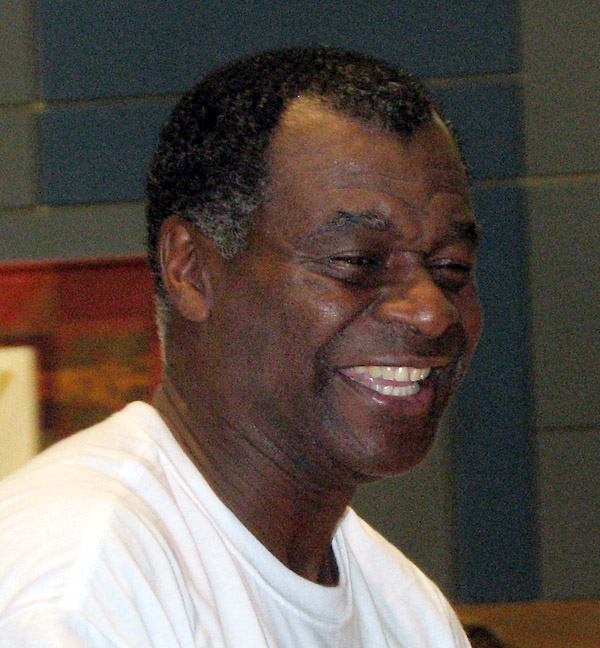
Calvin Murphy was the MVP of the 1966 game and scored a Roundball Classic record 37 points.

After the game two MVPs were named: one for the Pennsylvania team and one for the U.S. team. In 1979 and 1986 three U.S. selections played (East, Midwest and Southwest in 1979; East, South and North in 1986).

Year	Team	Player	High School (state)
1965	Pennsylvania	Simmie Hill	Midland
1965	United States	Bernie Williams	DeMatha Catholic (MD)
1966	Pennsylvania	Sam Iacino	Farrell
1966	United States	Calvin Murphy	Norwalk (CT)
1967	Pennsylvania	Dick DeVenzio	Ambridge
1967	United States	Jim McDaniels	Allen County (KY)
1968	Pennsylvania	Dennis Wuycik	Ambridge
1968	United States	Tom Riker	Saint Dominic (NY)
1969	Pennsylvania	Mark Gianfrancesco	Wilkinsburg
1969	United States	Nick Weatherspoon	Canton McKinley (OH)
1970	Pennsylvania	Tom McMillen	Mansfield
1970	United States	Dwight Jones	Wheatley (TX)
1971	Pennsylvania	Jimmie Baker	Olney
1971	United States	Campy Russell	Pontiac Central (MI)
1972	Pennsylvania	Joe Bryant	John Bartram
1972	United States	Phil Sellers	Thomas Jefferson (NY)
1973	Pennsylvania	Jeep Kelly	Schenley
1973	United States	Adrian Dantley	DeMatha Catholic (MD)
1974	Pennsylvania	Brad Davis	Monaca
1974	United States	Moses Malone	Petersburg (VA)
1975	Pennsylvania	Rodney Lee	Edison
1975	United States	Phil Hubbard	Canton McKinley (OH)
1976	Pennsylvania	Sonny Lewis	Schenley
1976	United States	Jay Shidler	Lawrenceville (IL)
1977	Pennsylvania	Eugene Banks	West Philadelphia
1977	United States	Wes Matthews	Warren Harding (CT)
1978	Pennsylvania	Bruce Atkins	Wilkinsburg
1978	United States	Walker Russell	Pontiac Central (MI)
1979	Pennsylvania	Bill Varner	Valley
1979	United States	Sidney Green (East)	Thomas Jefferson (NY)
1979	United States	Leon Wood (Midwest)	Saint Monica (CA)
1979	United States	Dominique Wilkins (Southwest)	Washington (NC)
1980	Pennsylvania	Tony Costner	Overbrook
1980	United States	Vern Fleming	Mater Christi (NY)
1981	Pennsylvania	Vic Alexander	Benjamin Franklin
1981	United States	Patrick Ewing	Cambridge Rindge and Latin (MA)
1982	Pennsylvania	Chip Greenberg	La Salle
1982	United States	Richard Rellford	Suncoast (FL)
1983	Pennsylvania	Rico Washington	Benjamin Franklin
1983	United States	Pearl Washington	Boys and Girls (NY)
1984	Pennsylvania	Junie Lewis	Abington
1984	United States	Cedric Henderson	Marietta (Georgia)
1985	Pennsylvania	Doug West	Altoona
1985	United States	Rod Strickland	Oak Hill Academy (VA)
1986	Pennsylvania	Rod Brookin	Steelton
1986	United States	Elander Lewis (East)	Albany (NY)
1986	United States	Eddie Cumbo (South)	Wheatley (TX)
1986	United States	Anthony Pendleton (North)	Flint Northwestern (MI)

=== East vs. West format ===
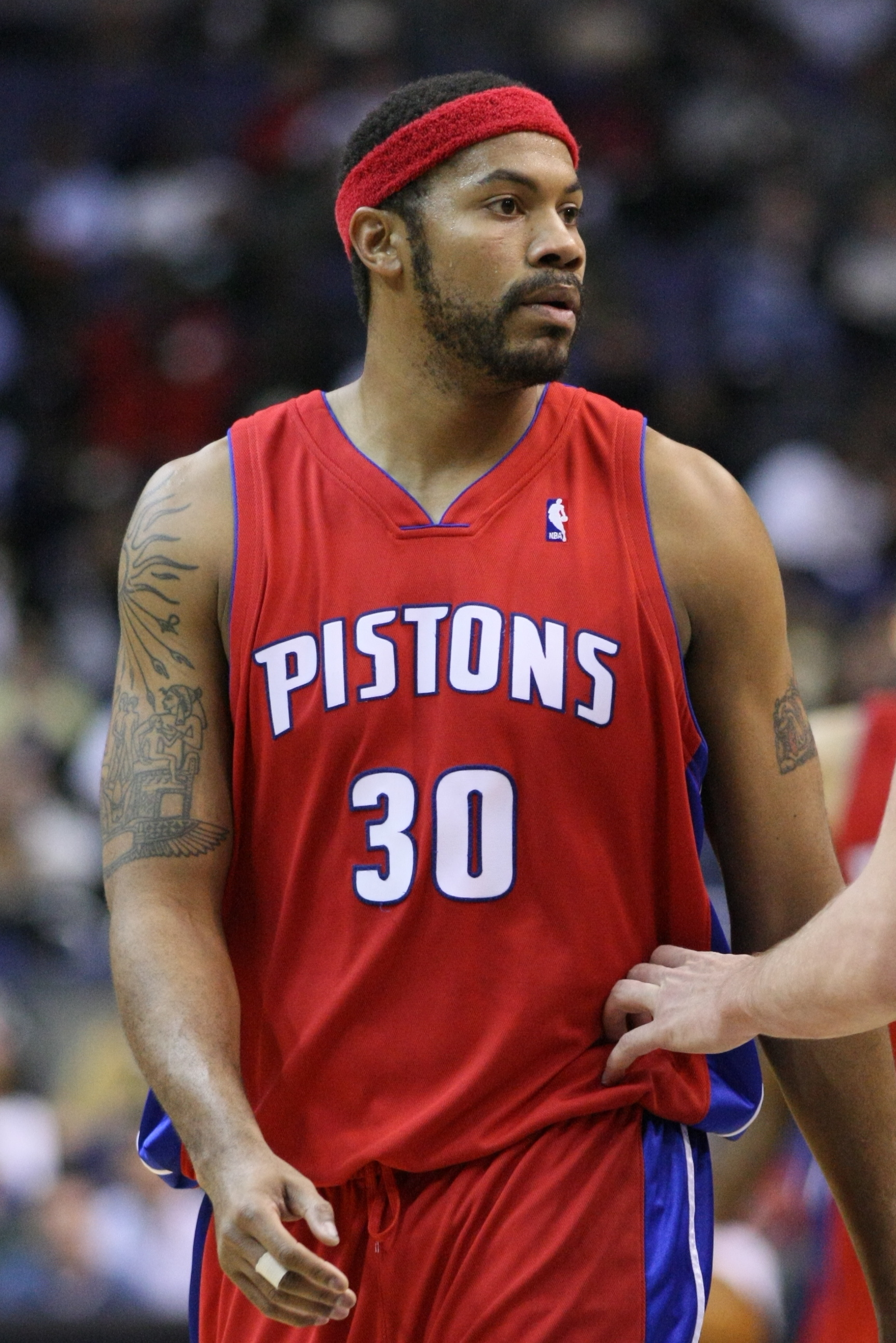
Rasheed Wallace scored 30 points in 1993 and was named the MVP for the East team.

Year	Team	Player	High School (state)
1987	East	Brian Shorter	Oak Hill Academy (VA)
1987	West	Marcus Liberty	King College Prep (IL)
1988	East	Orlando Vega	Oak Hill Academy (VA)
1988	West	Anthony Peeler	Paseo Academy (MO)
1989	East	Billy McCaffrey	Allentown Central Catholic (PA)
1989	West	Shaquille O'Neal	Robert G. Cole (TX)
1990	East	Anthony Miller	Benton Harbor (MI)
1990	West	Ed O'Bannon	Artesia (CA)
1991	East	Chris Webber	Detroit Country Day (MI)
1991	West	Glenn Robinson	Roosevelt (IN)
1992	East	Othella Harrington	Murrah (MS)
1992	West	Andre Woolridge	Benson (NE)
1993	East	Rasheed Wallace	Simon Gratz (PA)
1993	West	Rashard Griffith	King College Prep (IL)
1994	East	Felipe López	Rice (NY)
1994	West	Maurice Taylor	Henry Ford (MI)
1995	East	Ryan Blackwell	Pittsford (NY)
1995	West	Robert Traylor	Murray–Wright (MI)
1996	East	Tim Thomas	Paterson Catholic (NJ)
1996	West	Rashad Phillips	Ferndale (MI)
1997	East	Melvin Ely	Thornton Township (IL)
1997	West	Ricky Davis	Davenport North (IA)
1998	East	Cory Hightower	Mount Zion Christian Academy (NC)
1998	West	Rashard Lewis	Elsik (TX)
1999	East	DerMarr Johnson	Maine Central Institute (ME)
1999	West	Jason Richardson	Arthur Hill (MI)
2000	East	Brian Morrison	Lake Washington (WA)
2000	East	Taliek Brown	St. John's Prep (NY)
2000	West	Mario Austin	Sumter County (AL)
2001	East	John Allen	Coatesville (PA)
2001	West	Kwame Brown	Glynn Academy (GA)
2002	East	Raymond Felton	Latta (SC)
2002	West	Jason Fraser	Amityville Memorial (NY)
2002	West	Sean Dockery	Julian (IL)
2003	East	Mustafa Shakur	Friends' Central School (PA)
2003	West	LeBron James	St. Vincent–St. Mary (OH)
2004	East	J. R. Smith	St. Benedict's Prep (NJ)
2004	West	Shaun Livingston	Peoria (IL)
2004	West	A. J. Price	Amityville Memorial (NY)
2005	East	Danny Green	St. Mary's (NY)
2005	East	Nate Minnoy	Hales Franciscan (IL)
2005	West	Eric Devendorf	Oak Hill Academy (VA)
2005	West	Brandon Rush	Mount Zion Christian Academy (NC)
2006	East	Derrick Caracter	Notre Dame Prep (MA)
2006	East	Alex Stepheson	Harvard-Westlake (CA)
2006	West	Greg Oden	Lawrence North (IN)
2006	West	Daequan Cook	Dunbar (OH)
2007	East	O. J. Mayo	Huntington (WV)
2007	West	Corey Fisher	St. Patrick (NJ)
2007	West	JJ Hickson	Joseph Wheeler (GA)
2007	West	Kevin Love	Lake Oswego (OR)

== Alumni ==
Notable alumni include:

- Mahmoud Abdul-Rauf
- Shareef Abdur-Rahim
- Trevor Ariza
- Maceo Baston
- Thurl Bailey
- Benoit Benjamin
- Keith Bogans
- Aaron Brooks
- Kobe Bryant
- Matt Carroll
- Vince Carter
- Wilson Chandler
- Lenny Cooke
- Eddy Curry
- Adrian Dantley
- Glen Davis
- Paul Davis
- Keyon Dooling
- Chris Duhon
- LaPhonso Ellis
- Patrick Ewing
- Raymond Felton
- Kevin Garnett
- Drew Gooden
- A.C. Green
- Gerald Green
- Jason Hart
- Dwight Howard
- Juwan Howard
- Mark Jackson
- Joe Johnson
- Rashard Lewis
- Shaun Livingston
- Moses Malone
- Stephon Marbury
- Rodney McCray
- Tracy McGrady
- Josh McRoberts
- Sean Miller
- Randolph Morris
- Alonzo Mourning
- Calvin Murphy
- Joakim Noah
- Steve Novak
- Greg Oden
- Lamar Odom
- Shaquille O'Neal
- Travis Outlaw
- Tom Payne
- Kendrick Perkins
- Paul Pierce
- Leon Powe
- Gabe Pruitt
- Joel Przybilla
- Jason Richardson
- Byron Scott
- Josh Smith
- Tim Thomas
- Gerald Wallace
- Rasheed Wallace
- Chris Webber
- Dominique Wilkins
- Marvin Williams
- Shawne Williams
- Corliss Williamson

== Venues ==
- 1965–1992: Civic Arena in Pittsburgh, Pennsylvania
- 1993–1999: The Palace in Auburn Hills, Michigan
- 2000: Raleigh Entertainment & Sports Arena in Raleigh, North Carolina
- 2001: Welsh–Ryan Arena in Evanston, Illinois
- 2002–2007: United Center in Chicago, Illinois
