= Kripp Johnson =

American singer (1933–1990)

Kripp Johnson (born Corinthian Johnson; May 16, 1933 in Cambridge, Maryland – June 22, 1990) was an American singer for The Del-Vikings from 1956 to the 1980s. Johnson sang lead vocal on their hit "Whispering Bells", among other songs. He died of cancer in 1990 at age 57.
