= Joe Versus the Volcano =

1990 American romantic comedy film

- Theatrical release poster by John Alvin
- Directed by: John Patrick Shanley
- Written by: John Patrick Shanley
- Produced by: Teri Schwartz
- Starring: Tom Hanks; Meg Ryan; Lloyd Bridges; Robert Stack; Abe Vigoda; Dan Hedaya; Barry McGovern; Ossie Davis
- Cinematography: Stephen Goldblatt
- Edited by: Richard Halsey; Kenneth Wannberg
- Music by: Georges Delerue
- Production company: Amblin Entertainment
- Distributed by: Warner Bros. Pictures
- Release date: March 9, 1990
- Running time: 102 minutes
- Country: United States
- Language: English
- Budget: $25 million
- Box office: $39.4 million

Joe Versus the Volcano is a 1990 American romantic comedy film written and directed by John Patrick Shanley and starring Tom Hanks and Meg Ryan. Executive produced by Steven Spielberg, Kathleen Kennedy, and Frank Marshall of Amblin Entertainment, Joe Versus the Volcano follows the titular Joe Banks (Hanks), who, after being told he is dying of a rare disease, accepts a financial offer to travel to a South Pacific island and throw himself into a volcano on behalf of the superstitious natives. Along the way, he meets and falls in love with Patricia (Ryan), the woman tasked with taking him there.

Joe Versus the Volcano was released theatrically in the United States by Warner Bros. Pictures on March 9, 1990. It received mixed reviews from critics, though it was a minor box office success. It has since become a cult film.

== Plot ==
Joe Banks is a downtrodden everyman from Staten Island, working a clerical job in a dreary factory for an unpleasant, demanding boss, Frank Waturi. Joyless, listless and chronically sick, Banks regularly visits doctors who can find nothing wrong with him. Finally, Dr. Ellison diagnoses an incurable disease called a "brain cloud", which has no symptoms, but will kill him within five or six months. Ellison says that the symptoms he has been experiencing are actually psychosomatic, caused by trauma in his previous job as a firefighter. Ellison advises him to live the few remaining months of his life well. Joe tells his boss off, quits his job, and asks former coworker DeDe out on a date. Their date is a success, but when Joe tells DeDe that he is dying, she tells him she cannot deal with the revelation and leaves.

The next day, a wealthy industrialist named Samuel Graynamore makes Joe an unexpected proposition. Graynamore needs "bubaru", a mineral essential for manufacturing superconductors. There are deposits of it on the tiny Pacific island of Waponi Woo, but the resident Waponis will only let him mine it if he solves a problem for them. They believe that the fire god of the volcano on their island must be appeased by a voluntary human sacrifice once every century, but none of them are willing to volunteer this time around. Graynamore offers to pay for whatever Joe wants to enjoy his final days, as long as he jumps into the volcano within 20 days. With nothing to lose, Joe accepts.

Joe spends a day and a night out on the town in New York City, where he solicits advice on everything from style to living life to the fullest from his chauffeur, Marshall. He also purchases four top-of-the-line, waterproof steamer trunks from a fanatically dedicated luggage salesman.

Joe then flies to Los Angeles, where he is met by one of Graynamore's daughters, Angelica, a flighty socialite. The next morning, Angelica takes Joe to her father's yacht, the Tweedledee. The captain is her half-sister Patricia. Patricia has reluctantly agreed to take Joe to Waponi Woo; Graynamore has promised to give her the yacht in return.

After an awkward beginning, Joe and Patricia begin to bond. Then they run into a typhoon. Patricia is knocked unconscious and flung overboard. After Joe jumps in to rescue her, lightning strikes, sinking the yacht. Joe is able to construct a raft by lashing together his steamer trunks. Patricia does not regain consciousness for several days. Joe doles out the small supply of fresh water to her, while he gradually becomes delirious from thirst. He experiences a revelation during his delirium and thanks God for his life. When Patricia finally awakens, she is deeply touched by Joe's self-sacrifice. They then find that they have luckily drifted to their destination.

The Waponis treat them to a grand feast. Their leader, Chief Tobi, asks one last time if anyone else will volunteer, but there are no takers and Joe heads to the volcano. Patricia tries to stop him, declaring her love for him. He admits he loves her as well, "but the timing stinks." Patricia persuades Joe to have the chief marry them.

Afterwards, Patricia refuses to be separated from her new husband. When Joe is unable to dissuade her, they jump in together, but the volcano erupts at that moment, blowing them out into the ocean. The island sinks, but Joe and Patricia land near Joe's trusty steamer trunks. At first ecstatic about their miraculous salvation, Joe tells Patricia about his fatal brain cloud. She recognizes the name of Joe's doctor as that of her father's crony and realizes that Joe has been set up. He is not dying and they can live happily ever after.

== Cast ==
- Tom Hanks as Joe Banks
- Meg Ryan as DeDe/Angelica/Patricia Graynamore
- Lloyd Bridges as Samuel Harvey Graynamore
- Robert Stack as Dr. Ellison
- Abe Vigoda as Tobi, Chief of the Waponis
- Dan Hedaya as Mr. Waturi
- Barry McGovern as Luggage Salesman
- Amanda Plummer as Dagmar
- Ossie Davis as Marshall

In addition, two other notable actors in smaller roles are Nathan Lane as Baw, the Waponi advance man; and Carol Kane, a hairdresser.

== Themes and visual motifs ==
Joe Versus the Volcano contains themes pertaining to mortality and the search for meaning and a sense of purpose in one's life. Writer-director John Patrick Shanley said of his inspiration for making the film:

I started to experience Weltschmerz in New York a couple of years ago because all of my smaller problems were taken away, so I was faced with the really big problems like mortality and being alive on earth for a limited amount of time and what to do with that time. When you're a working stiff, you don't have as much time to brood on these things. [So] I sort of decided to write a film about it and how it might be overcome.

Regarding the film's exploration of coming to terms with one's own mortality, Shanley stated:

Almost all of us are in denial about death. And the weird thing is, you think, "They do that because if you were to worry about death you couldn't enjoy your life." But I think the reverse is true—if you don't recognize your mortality, you're tiptoeing through life and not letting in the full reality of what it is. When Joe lets that in, that's when life comes flooding in.

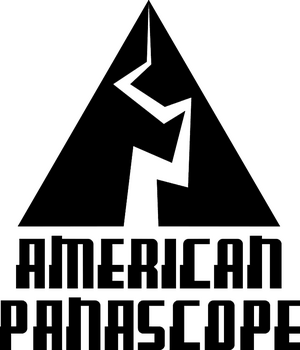
The film features a zigzag shape as a recurring visual motif, seen here in the logo of the fictional American Panascope company from the film

The film features a lightning-bolt-like symbol as a recurring motif, first appearing both in the logo of American Panascope—the fictional company at which Joe is initially employed—and as the shape of the pathway that leads to the American Panascope factory. The pattern also appears as a crack in a wall of Joe's apartment; in the lightning bolt that strikes and sinks the Tweedledee; and in the procession of the Waponis to the top of the volcano. Film critic Glenn Erickson wrote: "The zigzag crack represents both the fear we humans need to overcome, and the circuitous, detour-ridden paths our lives become when we don't aim straight for the truth. Like the absurd walkway leading to the hellish Panascope factory [...] we instead walk Joe's "crooked road" of doubt, cynicism and fear of life itself [...] Joe Versus the Volcano wants you [to] shuck off your zombie rags and stop being a Pod Person."

== Production ==
=== Writing and development ===
Shanley drew inspiration from his own life experiences in writing Joe Versus the Volcano. The portrayal of the American Panascope working environment was influenced by Shanley's experience working for a company that manufactured medical equipment (including catheters, endoscopes, and artificial testicles) when he was 18 years old. Shanley based the design of Joe's office after the office he worked in while employed there, including the fluorescent lighting and a pipe with a valve that reads, "Do not touch".

After writing a spec script of Joe Versus the Volcano, Shanley sent it to filmmaker Steven Spielberg. Shanley later recalled: "I was in Los Angeles at a hotel doing something, and the phone rang, and it was Spielberg. And he said, 'I read your script and I really like it.' I said, 'Thanks,' and he said, 'I understand that you want to direct it,' which I don't remember saying, and I said, 'Yes.' And he said, 'Well, I think that's a great idea.' And that's how I got the directing job of Joe Versus the Volcano!"

=== Filming ===
Joe Versus the Volcano was executive produced by Spielberg, Kathleen Kennedy, and Frank Marshall, and their production company Amblin Entertainment. Filming took place in Hawaii, Los Angeles, and New York. Bo Welch served as the film's production designer. The American Panascope factory was a building in Los Angeles; the pathway leading up to the factory, as well as the signage on the building, were added for the film, and smokestacks were matted onto the building in post-production.

Scenes set on the ocean, including the sequence in which the Tweedledee is caught in a typhoon, were shot using a large indoor water tank in a Metro-Goldwyn-Mayer (MGM) studio.

== Reception ==
=== Box office ===
The film opened in 1,082 theaters on March 9, 1990, grossing $9.2 million on its opening weekend. It opened at number two at the U.S. box office, behind The Hunt for Red October.

Joe Versus the Volcano went on to gross a total of $39,404,261.

=== Critical response ===
On the review aggregator website Rotten Tomatoes, the film holds an approval rating of 67% based on 39 reviews, with an average rating of 6.2/10. The website's critical consensus reads: "Joe Versus the Volcano erupts with plenty of screwball energy and thoughtful observations about living to the fullest, but its existential ambition may prove too goofy for some audiences." At Metacritic, the film has a weighted average score of 45 out of 100, based on 18 critics, indicating "mixed or average" reviews. Audiences surveyed by CinemaScore gave the film a grade "C+" on scale of A to F.

Vincent Canby wrote in his review: "Not since Howard the Duck has there been a big-budget comedy with feet as flat as those of Joe Versus the Volcano. Many gifted people contributed to it, but there's no disbelieving the grim evidence on the screen." Upon its release, Time's Andrea Sachs called it a "wan bit of whimsy ... [that] makes no more sense than its synopsis, though Meg Ryan beguiles in three different roles." Fifteen years later, Time critic Richard Schickel listed it as one of his "Guilty Pleasures"; while acknowledging "there are people who think this film... may be the worst big budget film of modern times," Schickel disagreed: "...you set aside the routine comic expectations its marketing encouraged, you may find yourself entranced by a movie that is utterly sui generis."

Roger Ebert gave Joe Versus the Volcano a score of 3.5 out of 4 stars, calling it "new and fresh and not shy of taking chances... [the film] achieves a kind of magnificent goofiness. Hanks and Ryan are the right actors to inhabit it, because you can never catch them going for a gag that isn't there: They inhabit the logic of this bizarre world and play by its rules." He later brought the film to Ebertfest 2012 and wondered "why he gave 3.5 stars instead of 4."

== Soundtrack ==
The soundtrack, composed by Georges Delerue, was not released in 1990, the year of the movie's release. Because of Delerue's strong following, a sub-label of Varèse Sarabande released a CD in 2002 (limited to 3,000 copies), and again in 2016 (with a few extra songs, limited to 2,000 copies).

Shanley wrote two songs for the film, "Marooned Without You" and "The Cowboy Song", the former used thematically throughout and the latter performed by Hanks on the ukulele.

Eric Burdon's version of Merle Travis's "Sixteen Tons" was used at the beginning of the film. After Joe leaves the doctor's office, an edited version of Ray Charles's version of "Ol' Man River" plays. "Mas que Nada" by Sergio Mendes & Brazil '66 accompanies Joe while he is driven around New York City. A Spanish version of "On The Street Where You Live" is sung while Joe is on his date with DeDe. Elvis Presley's version of "Blue Moon" plays as Joe spends his final night before departing on his journey. On the boat trip, the Young Rascals' version of "Good Lovin'", the Del-Vikings "Come Go with Me", and The Ink Spots' version of "I Cover the Waterfront" are heard. Waponi tribal music includes the melodies "When Johnny Comes Marching Home" and "Hava Nagila".

== Home media ==
Joe Versus the Volcano was first released on home video on August 15, 1990. In April 2002, it was released on DVD by Warner Home Video.

The manufacture-on-demand Blu-ray was released through Warner Archive Collection on June 20, 2017, and it received positive reviews for the quality. It was released on Blu-ray in the UK for the 1st time by Warner Archive on the 10th June 2024.

== Stage musical ==
In 2012, San Diego's Lambs Players Theatre presented the world premiere of a musical based on the film. Directed by Robert Smyth, it featured a book, music and lyrics by Scott Hafso and Darcy Phillips, with musical direction by Jon Lorenz and additional musical arrangements by Taylor Peckham.
