= Fee Bee Records =

American record label

Fee Bee Records was a record label started by Joe Averbach in Pittsburgh, Pennsylvania. The label is notable for recording The Del-Vikings hit "Come Go With Me" in 1957. Other Del-Viking songs recorded on the Fee Bee label include "How Can I Find True Love," "Whispering Bells", "I'm Spinning", and "You Say You Love Me." "Come Go With Me" was quickly released to Dot Records for national distribution in late January 1957, followed by "Whispering Bells" and "I'm Spinning" in May and August 1957.

Some of the Del-Vikings band members left Fee Bee for Mercury Records claiming that their contract was void since they signed under the age of 21. Kripp Johnson, the only member of the Del-Vikings who signed with Fee Bee who was over 21 stayed with the Fee Bee label under the names the Dell-Vikings and the Versatiles. He rejoined his original group (still called the Del-Vikings) with Mercury Records and cut ties with Fee Bee in 1958.
