= Sonny Vaccaro =

American sports businessman (born 1939)

John Paul Vincent "Sonny" Vaccaro (born September 23, 1939) is an American former sports marketing executive. He lives in Santa Monica, California.

== Biography ==
He was born in Trafford, Pennsylvania, to Italian-born Natale Vaccaro, who emigrated from Falerna, in the province of Catanzaro in Calabria, and Margaret Michelline Mastroianni. He has a younger brother named James, known as Jimmy or Chunch. Vaccaro studied physical education at Youngstown State University in Ohio, graduating in 1962. A high school teacher, in the early 1960s he began organizing basketball tournaments for local high schools in his native Pennsylvania. In 1965, supported by his friend and promoter Pat DiCesare, Vaccaro managed to organize an all-star game in Pittsburgh featuring the best talents in American high school basketball. This game, played on March 26, 1965, and funded by Dapper Dan Charities, pitted two teams called the National All-Stars against the Pennsylvania All-Stars, marking the inaugural edition of what would become known as the Roundball Classic.

In 1977, after learning that the kids who had attended the event were complaining about the need for rubber shoes for the summer, Vaccaro contacted a shoemaker friend, Bobby DiRinaldo, and, after creating 89 versions of a shoe he thought would fit the bill, he went to the headquarters of Nike, then a $28 million annual company. His rubber sandal idea was nixed by the company's management, but Vaccaro made such a good impression that Nike executives approached him about a way to enter the US high school and college basketball market, a sector in which it was illegal for companies to sponsor individual players. Vaccaro's idea of paying coaches to provide Nike shoes for their athletes was so simple and so successful that Vaccaro quickly became the golden man of Nike sports marketing. Thanks to him, Nike was able to make inroads into college basketball, quickly becoming a hugely popular brand.

Vaccaro became even more well-known in the basketball community when, among all the athletes in the 1984 NBA draft, he chose Michael Jordan. He convinced Nike, whose annual revenue had since risen to $834 million, to sign the player, who until then had been focused on Adidas, and subsequently created the Air Jordan brand. Also in 1984, with Nike's sponsorship, Vaccaro founded ABCD Camp, a summer basketball camp for high school students. Some of the sport's future stars, including Kobe Bryant, Dwight Howard, and LeBron James, attended the camp. The camp ran annually until 2007, proving to be a veritable showcase for future professional players.

In 1991, Vaccaro left Nike and, after a year and a half away from the sneaker world, began working for Adidas, eventually managing to sign Kobe Bryant with the German brand during an ABCD Camp. The relationship with the company ended in 2003, when Adidas and LeBron James failed to reach an agreement. According to Vaccaro, the company offered the player less than he had proposed to James, who ultimately chose Nike. In 2007, after four years with Reebok, Vaccaro left the world of sports marketing, dedicating himself instead to organizing lectures, visits, and interviews to express his belief that the NCAA imposes amateur status on college student-athletes. Vaccaro now lives in Santa Monica, California.

== Career ==
Vaccaro is best known for his tenure with Nike, Inc., where he signed Michael Jordan to his first sneaker deal. Vaccaro left Nike for Adidas, then Reebok. He founded the ABCD Camp, an elite showcase of high school basketball standouts, which ran from 1984 to 2007. It featured future stars Kobe Bryant, Dwight Howard, and LeBron James. Vaccaro cofounded the first national high school All-Star game, The Dapper Dan Roundball Classic, with concert promoter and boyhood friend Pat DiCesare in Pittsburgh in 1965. The game endured for 43 years and its alumni includes such greats as Calvin Murphy, Shaquille O'Neal, Kobe Bryant, Chris Webber, Alonzo Mourning, Kevin Garnett, Vince Carter, Tracy McGrady, Patrick Ewing, Rasheed Wallace and Stephon Marbury.

Vaccaro and basketball coach George Raveling had been close friends, to the point that Raveling was the best man at Sonny's second wedding. Raveling had a falling out with Sonny over the business of summer high school basketball camps that Sonny ran. Raveling became Sonny's competitor in the same position at Nike. Vaccaro was a key figure in the O'Bannon v. NCAA lawsuit, which allowed players to be compensated for appearances in video games. Vaccaro helped to recruit Ed O'Bannon for the case.

== Legacy ==
An ESPN 30 for 30 documentary about Vaccaro titled "Sole Man" aired on April 16, 2015. The show was themed around the "corrosive effect of pumping so much marketing money into the college game."

Ben Affleck and Matt Damon produced the 2023 film Air about his signing of Michael Jordan to Nike and ultimately the Air Jordan brand. Damon plays Vaccaro in the film.

In Vaccaro's memoir Legends and Soles: The Memoir of an American Original, which was co-authored with journalist Armen Keteyian and published in February of 2025, Vaccaro details his influential role in sports marketing and athlete advocacy. He goes in-depth into his personal relationships with basketball legends by the likes of Michael Jordan and LeBron James. Notably, he mentions the failure of Adidas to recognize LeBron's potential, leading to James' decision to sign with Nike. Furthermore, he gives his perspective on his fallout with the founder of Nike, Phil Knight, and his former compatriot, George Raveling.
