= Trib Total Media Amphitheatre =

Coordinates: 40°26′13″N 80°0′39″W

- Interactive map of Trib Total Media Amphitheatre
- Former names: Melody Amphitheatre (1989-90); I.C. Light Amphitheatre (1990-2003); Chevrolet Amphitheatre (2003-06); The Amphitheatre at Station Square (2009-10)
- Address: 1 E Station Square Dr; Pittsburgh, PA 15219-1157
- Location: South Shore
- Owner: Tribune-Review Company
- Capacity: 5,000
- Type: Outdoor amphitheatre

Construction
- Opened: May 31, 1989
- Closed: 2006-09; January 2012
- Reopened: May 25, 2009
- Demolished: April 2012

The Trib Total Media Amphitheatre was an outdoor music pavilion at Station Square in Pittsburgh, Pennsylvania. The venue had a seating capacity of 5,000 people.

In January 2007 it was announced that the amphitheatre would change its name to "The Amphitheatre at Sandcastle" and move to West Homestead, Pennsylvania.

The amphitheatre closed in 2006 and remained vacant until reopening May 2009. The venue ultimately closed in January 2012 and was demolished in April 2012. The Highmark Stadium was built on the grounds of the former amphitheatre.

== History ==
In 1989, DiCesare Engler Productions announced that they had partnered with the owners of the Station Square Festival Tent to open the Melody Amphitheatre at Station Square. The venue opened on May 31, 1989. The site hosted acts such as The Judds, Kenny G, and Stevie Ray Vaughan, as well as various ethnic festivals. The venue became known as the I.C. Light Amphitheatre in 1990.

By 1996, the amphitheatre hosted as many as 200,000 people per summer for events such as concerts, weekend festivals, and the yearly Fright Fest designed by Tom Savini The amphitheatre briefly moved to Pittsburgh's South Side in 1994, but was relocated to its original location in 1995 when DiCesare-Engler invested $400,000 to build a more permanent structure and increased the seating capacity from 4,000 to 5,000.

In 1999, DiCesare-Engler renovated the amphitheatre again, changing the direction of the stage to face west and adding a roof to cover as many as 4,000 seats.

The venue went through another name change in 2003, when it became the Chevrolet Amphitheatre at Station Square. Its last season as the Chevrolet Amphitheatre was 2006.

Forest City Enterprises did not extend the lease for the amphitheatre. The company was preparing for possible redevelopment of the site. Live Nation made tentative plans to move the amphitheatre to West Homestead, but the plans were postponed. The lot remained vacant until 2009.

On May 25, 2009, Brian Drusky, a former DiCesare-Engler employee who was laid off by Live Nation in 2005, promoted the first concert at the new amphitheatre.

The new venue seated up to 6,000 and was renamed to "The Amphitheatre at Station Square". A year later, the venue was known as the "Trib Total Media Amphitheatre". The venue closed after the 2011 season to make way for the Pittsburgh Riverhounds soccer stadium, planned to begin construction in mid-2012.

== See also ==
- List of contemporary amphitheatres
