= DiCesare Engler Productions =

DiCesare Engler Productions was a Pittsburgh-based concert promotion firm.

The company was formed in late 1973 when Pat DiCesare, who was the dominant concert promoter in the region, chose Pittsburgh native Rich Engler to form a new partnership. Engler was a drummer in a band and ran his own promotion company 'Go Attractions'. The firm promoted most of the major rock concerts and festivals in the Pittsburgh tri-state area (Pennsylvania, Ohio, and West Virginia) where the words 'Produced by DiCesare-Engler' became a familiar tagline in radio and television ads.

In 1977 the firm purchased The Stanley Theatre in downtown Pittsburgh. The venue was named the number one mid-size concert auditorium in the United States by Billboard magazine in 1978. That same year, DiCesare Engler Productions was named as the number two production team. Bill Graham Presents was number one. The theatre remained number one for several years until it was announced in November 1983 that the Pittsburgh Cultural Trust had purchased it for 12.1 million dollars.

DiCesare Engler also owned or operated other national top grossing venues in the 1980s and 1990s including the Syria Mosque, AJ Palumbo Center, and the IC Light Amphitheatre, as well as co-promoting concerts at the Star Lake Amphitheater in Burgettstown, Pennsylvania.

In July 1998 DiCesare Engler was sold to SFX Entertainment and became known as DiCesare Engler Productions/SFX. DiCesare Engler/SFX promoted the last concert at Three Rivers Stadium and the first concert at Heinz Field – 'N SYNC. They also promoted a pay-per-view concert known as the Rolling Rock Town Fair which averaged 90,000 in attendance.

The company became known as Clear Channel Entertainment Pittsburgh by the time Rich Engler parted ways with the company in 2004. It is now under name Live Nation.
