= Rock 'n' Roll to the Rescue =

Single by the Beach Boys

from the album Made in U.S.A.
- B-side: "Good Vibrations" (live)
- Released: June 9, 1986
- Genre: Pop rock; surf
- Length: 3:44
- Label: Capitol
- Songwriters: Mike Love; Terry Melcher
- Producer: Terry Melcher

The Beach Boys singles chronology
"She Believes in Love Again" (1985)	"Rock 'n' Roll to the Rescue" (1986)	"California Dreamin'" (1986)

Music video
- "Rock 'n' to the Rescue" on YouTube

"Rock 'n' Roll to the Rescue" is a song by American rock band the Beach Boys from their 1986 album Made in U.S.A. Written by Mike Love and Terry Melcher, it was released as a single on June 9, 1986 and reached No. 68 on the U.S. Billboard pop singles chart.

Cash Box said that it "features the unforgettable vocal harmonies and fun-loving trademarks that have endeared the Beach Boys to audiences for all these years." Billboard said "theme and beat date from their earliest days, vocal arrangements from their maturity."

== Personnel ==
Partial credits from Craig Slowinski.

- Brian Wilson - lead vocals, uncredited producer
- Mike Love - backing vocals
- Al Jardine - backing and additional lead vocals
- Carl Wilson - backing and additional lead vocals
- Bruce Johnston - backing vocals
- Terry Melcher - producer
- Bill House - associate producer
- unknown - acoustic guitars, synthesizers, drum machine

== Charts ==
Chart	Peak position
Australian Singles	79
Canada Top Singles	73
Dutch Top 40 Singles	33
New Zealand Singles	50
U.S. Billboard Hot 100	68
