= The Del-Vikings =

American doo-wop group

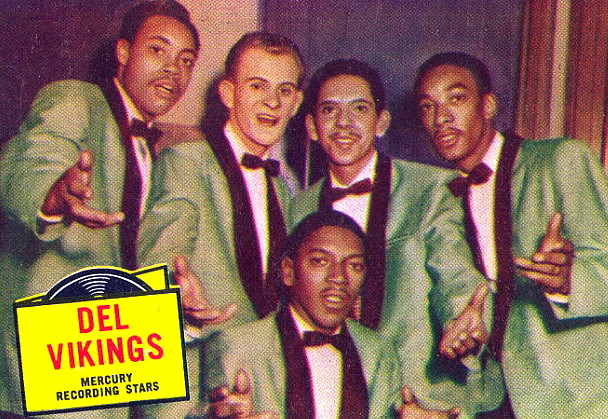
- The Del-Vikings in 1957

Background information
- Also known as: The Dell Vikings
- Origin: Pittsburgh, Pennsylvania, U.S.
- Genres: Pop; rock and roll; doo-wop
- Years active: 1955–1965, 1970–1973, 2000
- Labels: Fee Bee; Dot; Mercury; Luniverse; Alpine; ABC-Paramount; Crown; Gateway; Bim Bam Boom; Scepter
- Past members: Kripp Johnson; Donald Jackson; Clarence E. Quick; Samuel Paterson; David Lerchey; Norman Wright; Joe Lopes; Billy Blakely; Gus Backus; Chuck Jackson; Ed Everette; Ritzy Lee; Frank Ayers; Billy Woodruff; Doug White; Arthur Budd; Willie Green

The Del-Vikings (also known as The Dell-Vikings) were an American doo-wop musical group that recorded several hit singles in the 1950s and continued to record and tour with various lineups in later decades. The group is notable for the hit songs "Come Go with Me" and "Whispering Bells", and for having been a successful racially mixed musical group during a period of time when such groups were rare.

== History ==
=== Formation and early fame ===
The Del-Vikings were formed in 1955 by members of the United States Air Force stationed in Pittsburgh, Pennsylvania, with Clarence Quick, Kripp Johnson, Don Jackson, Samuel Paterson, Bernard Robertson, and guitarist Joe Lopes. Because all of the members were in the armed forces, the group constantly risked being disrupted by its members being assigned to other places. This happened soon after the group's forming when Paterson and Robertson were sent to Germany. They were replaced by baritone David Lerchey, the group's first white member, and tenor Norman Wright. Wright had started a group with Lawrence "Prince" Lloyd called the Valverteens from Amarillo Air Force Base, Texas, before joining the Del-Vikings. Shortly after, Don Jackson left the band and was replaced by Gus Backus, the group's second white member.

The band's name was created by Clarence Quick. Some sources say that band members had read about Vikings with the prefix "Del" being "added to give the group name an air of mystery." Another suggestion is that Clarence Quick had known of a basketball team in Brooklyn, New York, called the Vikings and had suggested the name. The name may also have originated from the popular Viking Press, publisher of paperbacks that group members liked to read.

Their first hit came in 1957 with "Come Go with Me", a Clarence Quick-penned song, released on Fee Bee Records as catalog number FB-205. In late January 1957, Dot Records re-released "Come Go With Me" as Dot 45–15538. The song became a hit, peaking at number five on the U.S. Billboard Top 100 Pop Charts (a predecessor of the 1958 established Billboard Hot 100 chart.) It sold over one million copies and was awarded a gold disc. The song was later featured in the films American Graffiti (1973), Diner (1982), Stand by Me (1986), Joe Versus the Volcano (1990), and Set It Up (2018). Rolling Stone listed "Come Go With Me" as number 449 on its list of the 500 Greatest Songs of All Time.

The Del-Vikings also released "Whispering Bells" in May 1957, another Clarence Quick song, with Kripp Johnson singing lead vocals. (The Dot label referred to Johnson as "Krips Johnson".) "Whispering Bells" reachednumber five on the U.S. rhythm and blues (R&B) chart and number 9 on the U.S. pop chart in 1957. "Whispering Bells" was featured in the 1986 film Stand by Me and was included in the film's soundtrack.

=== Split ===
All of the group members, other than Kripp Johnson, were under 21 when they signed their recording contract with Fee Bee (a tiny Pittsburgh label, which was later distributed by Dot Records). Having signed the contract as minors, they had the right to be released from it. In 1957, under the direction of their manager, Alan Strauss, they left to record at Mercury Records. Johnson, who was still bound to Fee Bee/Dot, stayed, thus creating two Del-Vikings groups. The original group replaced Johnson with Quick's friend William Blakely and recorded the Backus-led song "Cool Shake". Kripp Johnson constructed a new group with the returning Don Jackson, Chuck Jackson, Arthur Budd, and Ed Everette. This group recorded the Kripp Johnson-led "I'm Spinning", billing themselves as the Dell-Vikings.

Around this time, some old demonstration tracks had been sold to an up-and-coming record company, Luniverse, which overdubbed a backing track on these a capella songs, including an early version of "Come Go with Me". The eight-song album subsequently released by Luniverse was titled Come Go With the Del Vikings. Also, one single was released from these Luniverse overdubs—"Somewhere Over The Rainbow"/"Hey Senorita". For legal reasons, the LP was pulled off the market shortly after its release in July 1957.

Johnson's Dot group had an extra advantage; he had been discharged from the USAF and his group could tour freely, while the original group needed to seek military leave to tour. Mercury sued, claiming it had sole rights to any spelling of the group's name, and the Dell-Vikings briefly became the Versatiles, with singles being billed to "Kripp Johnson and the Versatiles" or "Chuck Jackson and the Versatiles". The group broke up, with Chuck Jackson going on to a successful solo career. Meanwhile, the original group had begun to fall apart. Gus Backus was restationed and replaced by the group's guitarist Joe Lopes. The Mercury Del-Vikings recorded their last record in October 1958.

By the end of 1959, Quick restructured the group with new talent from the Pittsburgh area—lead tenor Billy G. Woodruff, Willie Green, Horace Douglas "Doug" White, and Ritzy Lee. Kripp Johnson returned to the original group, making them a sextet. In 1960, they signed to ABC Records (ABC-Paramount). While the nucleus of the group was back, they were not able to chart any more hits, and the group split up in 1965.

=== Reunion and later developments ===
The Del-Vikings were back in 1970 with a near-original lineup of Clarence Quick, Kripp Johnson, Norman Wright, David Lerchey, and William Blakely. The group re-recorded their old hit for Scepter Records; a new version of "Come Go With Me" made the Bubbling Under the Hot 100 chart in 1973 (it also wound up on the Easy Listening chart, where it peaked that year at number 32).

They performed "Come Go with Me" on the April 27, 1973, episode of The Midnight Special. The lineup was Billy G. Woodruff, Roalf "Ritzy" Lee, Kripp Johnson, Clarence Quick, and Terry Young.

Norman Wright, David Lerchey, and Wright's two sons, Norman Wright, Jr., and Anthony Wright performed as the Del Vikings for PBS show Doo Wop 50 in 2000, and Wright toured and performed with his sons for the remainder of his life.

Clarence E. Quick died on May 5, 1983, at age 48.

Corinthian "Kripp" Johnson died of cancer on June 22, 1990, in Detroit, Michigan, at age 57.

David Lerchey (born in New Albany, Indiana) died of cancer on January 29, 2005, in Hallandale, Florida, at age 67.

Norman Wright died after a long illness on April 23, 2010, at age 72.

Billy G. Woodruff died on January 26, 2019, at age 81.

Donald Edgar "Gus" Backus died on February 21, 2019, in Germering, Germany, at age 81.

Roalf E. "Ritzy" Lee died on June 27, 2020.

Joe Lopes died on February 22, 2025.

== Singles discography ==
Year	Titles (A-side, B-side) Both sides from same album except where indicated	Chart positions	
Year	Titles (A-side, B-side) Both sides from same album except where indicated	US	US R&B
1957	"Come Go With Me" b/w "How Can I Find True Love"; Original local release on Pittsburgh-based Fee Bee label First national release on Dot	5	2
1957	"What Made Maggie Run" b/w "When I Come Home" or alt. "Uh Uh Baby" on B-side; Original local release on Pittsburgh-based Fee Bee label		
1957	"What Made Maggie Run" b/w "Little Billy Boy"; National release on Dot with different B-side		
1957	"Whispering Bells" b/w "Don't Be a Fool"; Released on Fee Bee and Dot around the same time	9	5
1957	"I'm Spinning" b/w "You Say You Love Me"; Released on Fee Bee (and on Dot b/w "When I Come Home")		
1957	"Cool Shake" b/w "Jitterbug Mary"; Released on Mercury	12	9
1957	"Come Along With Me" b/w "Whatcha Gotta Lose"		
1957	"Snowbound" b/w "Your Book of Life"		
1957	"Willette" b/w "Woke Up This Morning"; Released on Fee Bee and Dot		
1958	"Can't Wait" b/w "The Voodoo Man" (from The Swinging, Singing Del Vikings)		
1958	"You Cheated" b/w "Pretty Little Things Called Girls"		
1958	"Flat Tire" b/w "How Could You"		
1960	"Pistol Packin' Mama" b/w "The Sun"		
1961	"Bring Back Your Heart" b/w "I'll Never Stop Crying"	101	
1961	"I Hear Bells (Wedding Bells)" b/w "Don't Get Slick on Me"		
1961	"Face the Music" b/w "Kiss Me"		
1962	"The Big Silence" b/w "One More River to Cross"		
1962	"Confession of Love" b/w "Kilimanjaro"		
1962	"An Angel Up in Heaven" b/w "The Fishing Chant (Re Manu Pakurua)"		
1963	"Too Many Miles" b/w "Sorcerer's Apprentice"		
1964	"I've Go to Know" b/w "We Three"		
1966	"Down In Bermuda" b/w "Maggie" (or "What Made Maggie Run")		
1972	"Come Go With Me" (New version) b/w "When You're Asleep"	112	
1972	"Cold Feet" b/w "I Want to Marry You"; Both sides with Chuck Jackson		
1973	"Watching the Moon" b/w "You Say You Love Me"; Both sides led by Kripp Johnson		
1973	"I'm Spinning" b/w "Girl Girl"; A-side led by Kripp Johnson, B-side by Chuck Jackson		

== See also ==
- Del Vikings (France), an antifascist black youth subculture with a love for American classic cars, doo wop, and early rock & roll
