= Whispering Bells (song) =

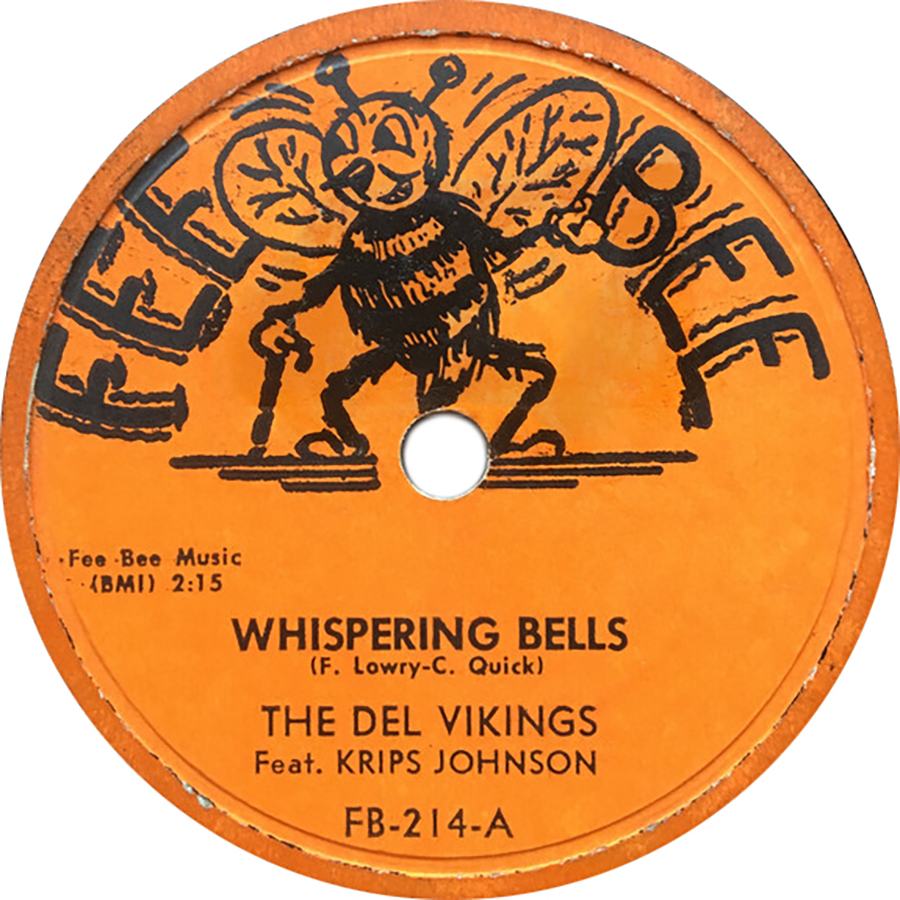

Single by The Del-Vikings
- B-side: "Don't Be a Fool"
- Released: May 27, 1957
- Genre: Doo-wop
- Length: 2:15
- Label: Fee Bee • Dot
- Songwriters: Fred Lowry, Clarence Quick

The Del-Vikings singles chronology
"Come Go with Me" (1957)	"Whispering Bells" (1957)	"I'm Spinning" (1957)

"Whispering Bells" is a song performed by the Del-Vikings (a.k.a. the Dell-Vikings). It reached No. 5 on the U.S. R&B chart and No. 9 on the U.S. pop chart in 1957. Kripp Johnson was the lead vocalist on this recording. Clarence E. Quick, who was the bass vocalist in the group, wrote the song.

The song ranked No. 49 on Billboard's Year-End top 50 singles of 1957.

== Other versions ==
- The Mighty Echoes released a version of the song on their 2006 album A Cappella Cool.
- Jesse Winchester released a version of the song on his 2014 album A Reasonable Amount of Trouble.

== In popular culture ==
- The Del-Vikings' version of "Whispering Bells" was featured in the 1986 film Stand by Me and was included in the film's soundtrack.
