= Kurzweil K250 =

1984 sampler by Kurzweil Music Systems

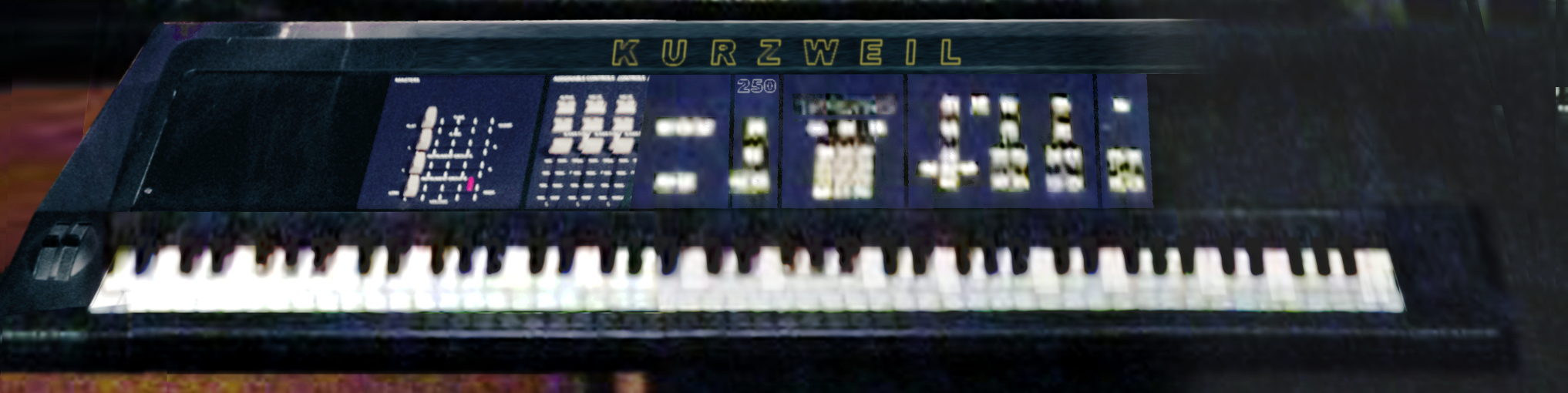
Kurzweil K250 (1984)

The Kurzweil K250, manufactured by Kurzweil Music Systems, was an early electronic musical instrument which produced sound from sampled sounds compressed in ROM, faster than common mass storage such as a disk drive. Acoustic sounds from brass, percussion, string and woodwind instruments as well as sounds created using waveforms from oscillators were utilized. Designed for professional musicians, it was invented by Raymond Kurzweil, founder of Kurzweil Computer Products, Inc., Kurzweil Music Systems and Kurzweil Educational Systems with consultation from Stevie Wonder, Lyle Mays (Pat Metheny Group), Alan R. Pearlman (ARP Instruments), and Robert Moog (Moog synthesizer).

== History ==
In the mid-1970s, Raymond Kurzweil invented the first multi-font reading machine for the blind, consisting of the earliest CCD flat-bed scanner and text-to-speech synthesizer. In 1976, the blind musician, Stevie Wonder, heard about the demonstration of this new machine on The Today Show, and later became the user of the first production Kurzweil Reading Machine, beginning a long-term association between the two.

In 1982, Stevie Wonder invited Raymond Kurzweil to his studio in Los Angeles, and asked if "we could use the extraordinarily flexible computer control methods on the beautiful sounds of acoustic instruments?" In response, and with Stevie Wonder as musical advisor, Raymond Kurzweil founded Kurzweil Music Systems. Kurzweil used the sampling technique that had been exploited in reading machines (such as the Kurzweil Reading Machine used by Wonder) and adapted it for music. Reading machines sample the characters in a text document to produce an image. The machines convert the light and dark areas of the image into text data stored in RAM or EPROM, then output spoken text with a text-to-speech synthesizer.

== Sound reproduction technique ==
The Kurzweil K250 utilized a similar concept: Sounds were sampled, compressed & converted into digital data, stored in ROM and reproduced as sound via 12 separate DACs (digital-to-analog converters) and analog envelopes (CEM 3335), programmed to simulate the dynamics and sustain of the original sound. This method was called "contoured modelling" by Kurzweil in marketing material and regarded as a proprietary scheme. Synthesizer pioneer Bob Moog, then a consultant at Kurzweil, was asked about the method in an article in Electronic Sound Maker in 1985:

ESM: About the 250: Kurzweil mentions something called "contoured sound modelling". Can you explain that a little?

R.M: Yeah, it's a proprietary scheme... and 'proprietary' is a polite word for "we're not going to tell you what it is!" It is a very complex, elaborate software, a set of programs that are used to compress the data of a series of sounds, so that we can get it into a reasonable amount of memory. If we took just raw sounds and digitized them—every sound, every key on the piano is different, for instance. And within one key, every level of dynamics has a different waveform. It's just not that it's louder, the whole waveform changes.

ESM: Which is a much more natural sound.

R.M: Yeah, now we want to get all that information in there, we want to be able to construct those differences, but we want to eliminate all the superfluous information, you know, the redundancy, the information that we don't need in order to reconstruct this. And that's what "contoured sound modelling" is all about. If all the sounds that are in the machine now were without the data being compressed, it would take more memory chips than are made in a year!

This method greatly reduced the number of then-expensive EPROMS needed while maintaining the dynamics of the sound, which would be otherwise compromised by compression. The CEM 3335's integrated voltage controlled amplifier provided exponential gain to reconstruct the dynamics that were lost in the compression.

A prototype of the Kurzweil K250 was manufactured for Stevie Wonder in 1983. It featured Braille buttons along with sliders (potentiometers) for various controls and functions, an extensive choice of acoustic and synthesized sounds, a sampler to record sounds onto RAM, and a music sequencer with battery-backed RAM for composition. During production of the Kurzweil K250, at least five units were manufactured for Stevie Wonder.

The Kurzweil K250 was unveiled during the 1984 NAMM Winter Music & Sound Market trade show. The Kurzweil K250 was manufactured until 1990, initially as an 88-key fully weighted keyboard or as an expander unit without keys called the Kurzweil K250 XP. A few years later, a rack mount version called the Kurzweil K250RMX also became available.

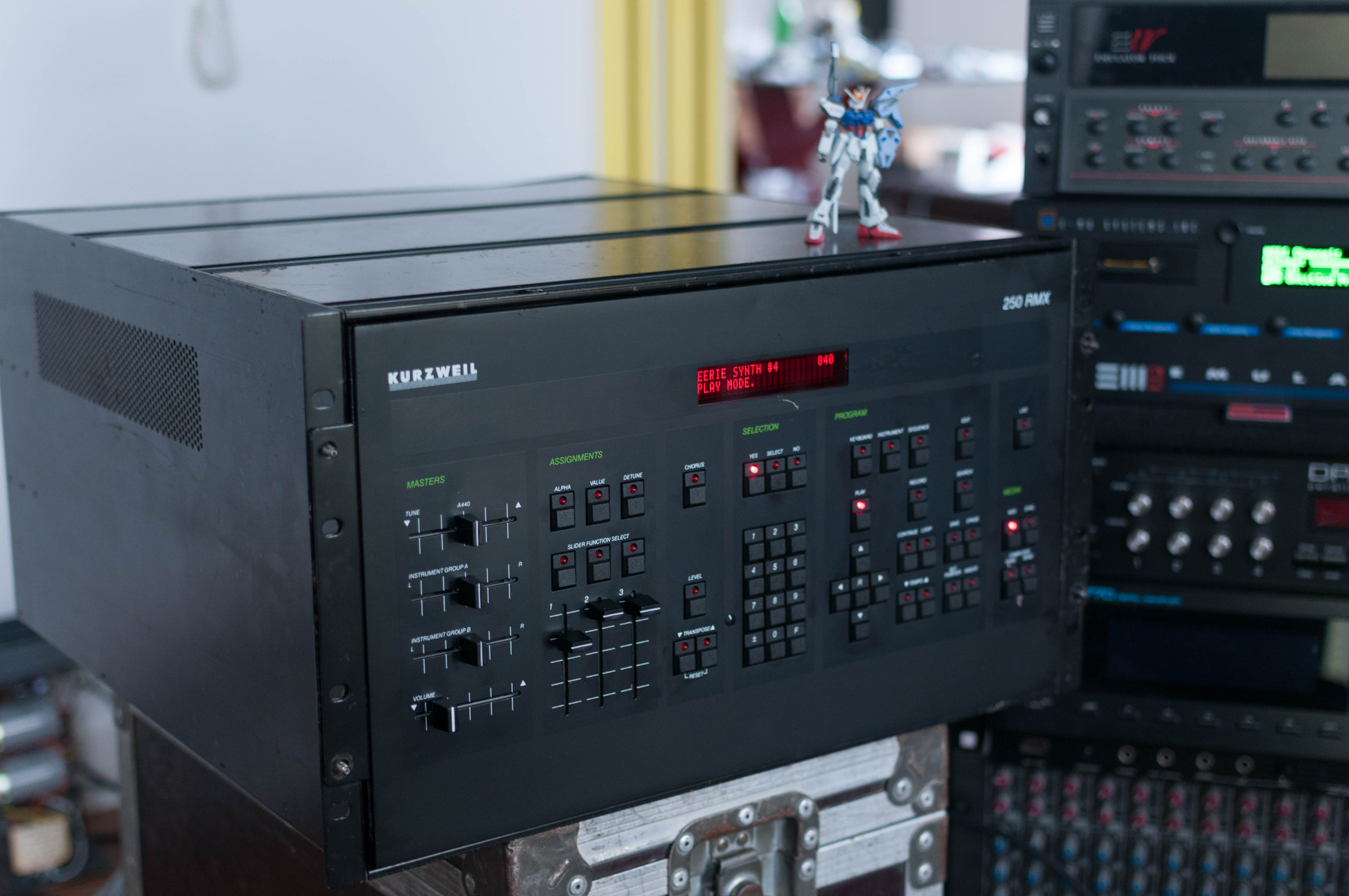
Photo of the K250 Rack unit (the K250RMX)

The Kurzweil K250 was the first electronic instrument to faithfully reproduce the sounds of an acoustic grand piano. It could play up to 12 notes simultaneously (known as 12-note polyphony) by using individual sounds as well as layered sounds (playing multiple sounds on the same note simultaneously, also known as being multitimbral). Until then the majority of electronic keyboards used synthesized sounds and emulated acoustical instrument sounds created in other electronic instruments using various waveforms produced by oscillators, and prior to that there were instruments such as the Mellotron and Orchestron which used taped samples. Five other manufactured digital sampled sound musical instruments were available at that time: E-mu Corporation's E-mu Emulator and E-mu Emulator II; Fairlight Corporation's Fairlight CMI; and New England Digital's Synclavier I and Synclavier II.
