= Come Go with Me =

1956 song by the Del-Vikings

Single by the Del-Vikings
- B-side: "How Can I Find True Love"
- Released: January 1957 (Fee Bee/Dot); July 1957 (Luniverse Records)
- Recorded: October 1956 (audition version); December 1956 (studio version)
- Genre: Doo-wop
- Length: 2:40
- Label: Fee Bee, Dot, Luniverse
- Songwriter: Clarence Quick

The Del-Vikings singles chronology
"Come Go with Me" (1957)	"Whispering Bells" (1957)

"Come Go with Me" is a song written by C. E. Quick (a.k.a. Clarence Quick), an original member (bass vocalist) of the American doo-wop vocal group the Del-Vikings. The original audition version of the song was recorded by The Del-Vikings in 1956. It was released in July 1957 on George Goldner's Luniverse Records as Come Go with the Del Vikings, after distribution of the final, hit version by Dot Records in January 1957. The group's lead vocalist has long been disputed, with both Norman Wright and Gus Backus cited in various sources, although Backus was not in the group at the time. When Joe Averbach, the owner of Fee Bee Records could not handle the demand, he signed with Dot Records in late January 1957; the song became a hit, peaking at No. 5 on the US Billboard Top 100 Pop Chart (a predecessor of the 1958 established Billboard Hot 100). It also reached No. 2 on the R&B chart.

"Come Go with Me" and another 8 songs were recorded in the basement of Pittsburgh disc jockey Barry Kaye. These recordings were released in 1992 as 1956 Audition Tapes.

The song was later featured in the films American Graffiti (1973), American Hot Wax (1978), Diner (1982), Stand by Me (1986), Joe Versus the Volcano (1990), and Set It Up (2018). It was included in Robert Christgau's "Basic Record Library" of 1950s and 1960s recordings, published in Christgau's Record Guide: Rock Albums of the Seventies (1981). It sold over one million copies and was awarded a gold disc.

Rolling Stone magazine ranked the song No. 449 in its list of the 500 Greatest Songs of All Time.

== The Beach Boys version ==
"Come Go with Me"

Single by the Beach Boys

from the album M.I.U. Album and Ten Years of Harmony
- B-side: "Don't Go Near the Water"
- Released: October 2, 1978 (album); November 2, 1981 (single)
- Recorded: September 26, 1975 to June 1978
- Genre: Doo-wop
- Length: 2:08
- Label: Caribou Records
- Songwriter: Clarence Quick
- Producer: Al Jardine

The Beach Boys singles chronology
"The Beach Boys Medley" (1981)	"Come Go with Me" (1978)	"Getcha Back" (1985)

"Come Go with Me" later was covered by the Beach Boys, and it was included on their 1978 album M.I.U. Album. Although not released as a single at the time, the song was included on the Beach Boys compilation album Ten Years of Harmony in 1981. After being released as a single to promote the compilation, it rose to No. 18 on the Billboard Hot 100 chart in January 1982. According to Al Jardine, he requested bandmate Brian Wilson to contribute the horn arrangement; Wilson devised it on the spot at Sunset Sound Recorders while dressed in a bathrobe.

Record World wrote that the performance "spotlights the group's renowned multi-vocal interaction and harmonies."

=== Personnel ===
Credits sourced from Craig Slowinski, John Brode, Will Crerar, Joshilyn Hoisington and David Beard.

The Beach Boys

- Al Jardine - lead and backing vocals, acoustic guitars, tack piano, bass guitar, fingersnaps, handclaps, glockenspiel, horn arrangement
- Mike Love - co-lead and backing vocals
- Brian Wilson - backing vocals, horn arrangement
- Carl Wilson - backing vocals

Additional musicians

- Ricky Fataar - drums
- Matt Jardine - fingersnaps, handclaps
- Michael Sherry - fingersnaps, handclaps
- Unknown - saxophones

=== Chart history ===
Chart (1981–82)	Peak position
Canada RPM Top Singles	20
Canada RPM Adult Contemporary	7
US Billboard Hot 100	18
US Billboard Adult Contemporary	11
US Cash Box Top 100	20

== Other versions ==
Dion included the song on his 1962 album, Lovers Who Wander. Released as a single (Laurie 3121), it reached No. 48 on the Billboard Hot 100 in 1963.

The Quarrymen, a precursor to the Beatles, played "Come Go with Me" at the fete at St Peter's Church, Woolton, Liverpool, on July 6, 1957. This was the first time Paul McCartney heard John Lennon performing. McCartney noticed how Lennon did not seem to know all the words, so he was ad-libbing instead, with phrases like "come and go with me... down to the penitentiary" which he thought was clever. After the set, McCartney impressed Lennon with his guitar and piano skills, and Lennon invited McCartney to join the band. In 2000, several ex-Quarrymen performed a version of the song for the film Two of Us.
