= Steve Levine =

British record producer

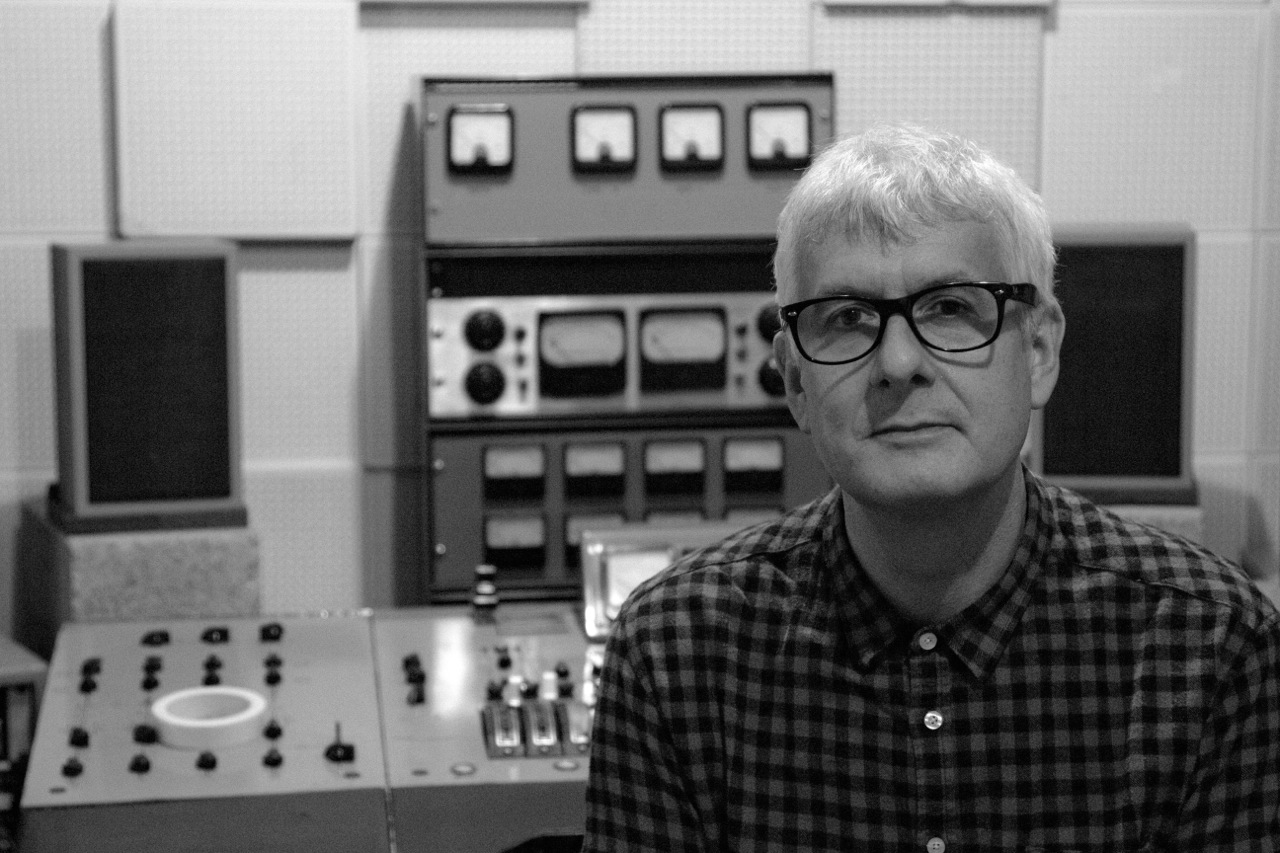
Levine in 2012

Steve Levine is a British record producer, best known for his work on Culture Club's studio albums. He won a Brit Award for Producer of the Year in 1984. He has also composed film and TV scores.

== Career ==
Levine's career began as a trainee tape-op at CBS studios in 1975, soon progressed to in house engineer, working with many new wave and punk acts including the Clash, the Jags, XTC and many of CBS Records' pop acts, including Sailor.

It was at CBS that Levine met Beach Boy Bruce Johnston, who would play an important role in the consolidation of his production career, culminating with Levine producing the 1985 album The Beach Boys. From the early 1980s, with the worldwide success of Culture Club, Levine's reputation grew and, apart from the Beach Boys, he produced work for the Honeyz, John Howard, China Crisis, Motörhead, Ziggy Marley, Westworld and Gary Moore. In 2013, Levine was chairman of the Music Producer's Guild.

Levine created and co-presents the BBC Radio 2 and BBC Radio 6 Music programme The Record Producers, with regular BBC Radio 2 host Richard Allinson. This series of documentaries analyse, from the record producer's perspective, how iconic recordings are created.

Levine has collected several prestigious awards including a Brit Award for Producer of the Year in 1984. Levine is also a LIPA companion and holds an Honorary Doctorate at Bucks University. He is the author of The Hit Kit and The Art of Downloading Music.

In 2018, Levine won two golds at the New York Festivals Radio Awards for his work on a BBC documentary on Bing Crosby.

Levine has a record label, Hubris Records, and has held music production masterclasses at the Liverpool Institute of Performing Arts.

== Personal life ==
Levine and his wife, radio producer and talent manager Karen, have two daughters. They live in Liverpool. His daughter also works in the music industry and resides in London.
